= Francis Eyles =

Francis Eyles may refer to:

- Sir Francis Eyles, 1st Baronet (died 1716), Governor of the Bank of the England
- Francis Eyles (died 1735) (1679–1735), MP for Devizes
- Francis Eyles (died 1750) (1704–1750), MP for Devizes
- Francis Haskins Eyles-Stiles (died 1762), British landowner

== See also ==
- Eyles
