= John Eyles =

John Eyles is the name of:

- John Eyles (MP for Devizes) (died 1703), MP for Devizes
- Sir John Eyles, 2nd Baronet (1683–1745), MP for Chippenham and City of London
- Sir John Haskins Eyles-Stiles, 4th Baronet (1741–1768) of the Eyles-Stiles baronets
- Lieutenant-Colonel John Eyles Blundell, Companion of The Most Honourable Order of the Bath, see 1897 Diamond Jubilee Honours
- John D. Eyles (born 1946), Canadian geographer
