= Eyles =

Eyles is a surname. Notable people with the surname include:

- Derek Charles Eyles (1902–1974), British illustrator
- Don Eyles (1944), retired computer engineer, worked on the computer systems in the Apollo 11 Lunar Landing
- Francis Eyles (disambiguation), multiple people
- Frederick Eyles (1864–1937), English-born Rhodesian botanist, politician and journalist
- John Eyles (disambiguation), multiple people
- Leonora Eyles (1889–1960), novelist, memoirist and feminist
- Nick Eyles, University of Toronto professor
- Thomas Eyles (c. 1769–1835), Royal Navy officer

== See also ==
- Eyles-Stiles Baronets
