= Josiah Diston =

English cloth factor, banker and Whig politician

Josiah Diston (1667–1737), of Blackwell Hall, Basinghall Street, London and Woodcote Grove, Epsom, Surrey, was an English cloth manufacturer, banker and Whig politician who sat in the English House of Commons from 1705 to 1707 and in the British House of Commons between 1707 and 1722.

Diston was the second son of Josiah Diston of Chipping Norton, Oxfordshire and his wife Mary. He was from a dissenting family. For several years he was a leading factor in the cloth trade at Blackwell Hall, the London cloth market. The cloth trade brought him wealth and he became closely connected with the town of Devizes in Wiltshire.

In 1701, Diston became a Director of the Bank of England. He stood for Parliament for Devizes at the 1705 English general election, but was defeated. However he was returned as Member of Parliament for Devizes at a by-election on 11 December 1706. Having established a political presence at Devizes, he used his wealth to consolidate his interest, spending, it was said, £3,000 by the spring of 1708 in preparation for the general election. He also took part in intense political struggles within the corporation of Devizes. As a result, he headed the poll at Devizes at the 1708 general election. In November 1708, he was on the committee for drafting a bill encouraging woollen and iron manufacturers, and in March 1709 he voted for the naturalization of the Palatines. He was put forward to draft a bill for public registration of deeds, wills and conveyances made in Wiltshire, and voted for the impeachment of Dr Sacheverell in 1710. However, at the 1710 general election, there was a double return at Devizes and he was dislodged. He was also defeated at Devizes at the 1713 general election.

From about 1713 Diston began buying up land at Epsom, where he built a house, Mount Diston (now Woodcote Grove), where he lived for approximately 15 years.

Diston was again returned as a Whig MP at Devizes at the 1715 general election. In Parliament he voted for the Septennial bill and for the repeal of the Occasional Conformity and Schism Acts. He voted against the Peerage Bill in 1719. In 1721 he became Deputy Governor of the Bank of England for the next three years and also Receiver General of Taxes for Westminster and Middlesex. He lost his seat at Devizes in 1722, when he only polled two votes, and did not stand again. He also started to sell off his property in Epsom. He had incurred a debt of £23,446 by 1726, when he failed as receiver general. His sureties had paid up only £17,574 by August 1730. He spent the rest of his life in debt and was in receipt of royal bounty from then until his death.

Diston died at Hampstead on 7 November 1737.

Parliament of England
Preceded by John Methuen; Sir Francis Child	Member of Parliament for Devizes; 1706–1707; With: Sir Francis Child	Succeeded by Parliament of Great Britain
Parliament of Great Britain
Preceded by Parliament of England	Member of Parliament for Devizes; 1707–1710; With: Sir Francis Child 1707-1708; Paul Methuen 1708-1710	Succeeded by Sir Francis Child; Thomas Richmond Webb
Preceded by Robert Child; John Nicholas	Member of Parliament for Devizes; 1715–1722; With: Francis Eyles 1715-1721; Benjamin Haskins-Stiles 1721-1722	Succeeded by Sir Joseph Eyles; Benjamin Haskins-Stiles
