= Samuel Child =

English banker and politician (1693–1752)

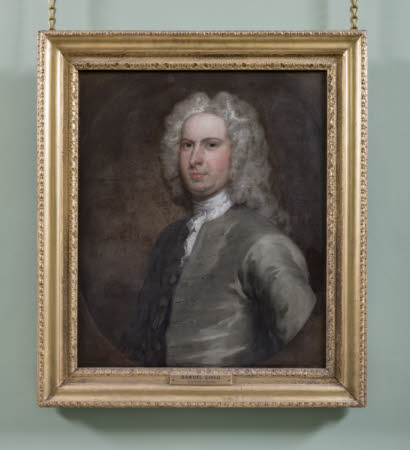
- Born: 1693
- Died: 1 October 1752 (aged 58–59)
- Occupation: Politician, banker
- Parent(s): Francis Child
- Relatives: Francis Child

Samuel Child (1693 – 1 October 1752) was an English banker and politician. He served as Member of Parliament (MP) for Bishop's Castle from 1747 to 1752.

Child was the 11th son of Sir Francis Child, a banker, MP, and Lord Mayor of London in 1698. He was a partner in the family bank Child & Co. until the death in 1740 of his brother Francis, when he became head of the bank.

At the 1747 general election, he was invited to stand as a Tory candidate for Middlesex, where his family owned land. However, he had previously promised his support to Sir Roger Newdigate, and instead stood for Bishop's Castle. The borough's patron, John Walcot, borrowed £8,500 (£17.3 million in 2023) from Child's bank, and Child was returned unopposed.

After his death in October 1752, aged 59, he was succeeded as head of the bank firstly by his son Francis, and after Francis's death in 1763 by his younger son Robert.

Parliament of Great Britain
Preceded by Viscount Trentham; John Robinson Lytton	Member of Parliament for Bishop's Castle; 1747 – 1752; With: John Robinson Lytton	Succeeded by John Dashwood-King; John Robinson Lytton
