= Humphrey Parsons =

British merchant and politician

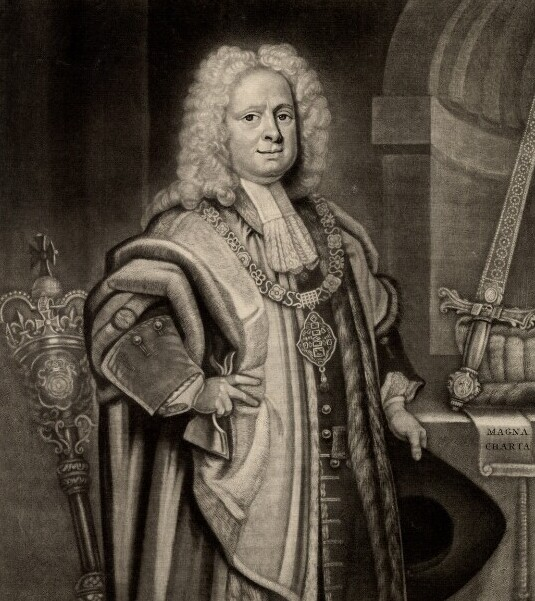
c. 1730 engraving of Parsons

Humphrey Parsons (1676 – 21 March 1741) was a British merchant and Tory politician who twice served as Lord Mayor of London in 1730 and 1740. He also sat in the British House of Commons from 1722 to 1741.

== Early life ==
Parsons was the third and eldest surviving son of Sir John Parsons by his first wife Elizabeth Beane, daughter of Humphrey Beane of Epsom. He carried on a successful business as a brewer in Aldgate, and had in his hands the principal export trade in beer to France. The goods which he sent to that country were exempted from import duty, a privilege which he owed to the personal favour of Louis XV.

== Patronage of Louis XV ==
Parsons is said to have been brought under the king's notice during hunting, a sport to which he was passionately addicted. His spirited English courser outstripped the rest, and, in contravention of the usual etiquette, brought him in at the death. In response to the king's inquiries, Parsons was maliciously described to him as ‘un chevalier de Malte.’ At an interview which followed, Parsons offered his horse, which had attracted the king's admiration, for his majesty's acceptance. The horse was accepted, and the king, who showed him every mark of favour, presented him, on 16 February 1731, with his portrait set in diamonds. This story, told by Hughson (Edward Pugh) in his ‘History of London’ (ii. 195), is corroborated by other writers. A broadside of 1741, in the British Museum (fol. 1872, a. [177]), entitled ‘A Hymn to Alderman Parsons, our Lord Mayor,’ describes him as a churchman, an incorruptible tory, and as being proof against the bribery and wiles of the whigs. It then proceeds:

- In France he is respected,
- The French King does agree
- That he should bring his beer
- Over there duty-free.

(See also Catalogue of Satirical Prints in the British Museum, div. 1, ii. 717–18.)

== Political career ==
Parsons was a member of the Wax Chandlers' Company, of which he was admitted a freeman on 7 March 1720. He was chosen master of the Company on 2 August 1722, but was excused serving at his request. This being a minor company, he was, according to custom, translated upon his election as lord mayor to one of the twelve great companies, viz., the Grocers'. He was elected alderman of Portsoken in March 1721, served the office of Sheriff of London in 1722, and was president of Bridewell and Bethlehem Hospitals from 1725 until his death in 1741. He was a board member of the High Tory Loyal Brotherhood.

Parsons unsuccessfully contested Reigate on his family's interest in 1717 and again at the 1722 general election. However at the 1722 election he was returned as Member of Parliament for Harwich. At the 1727 general election, he was returned as MP for City of London, where he was described as being ‘universally beloved for his good nature and open behaviour, and very popular amongst the common people for his great affability and condescension’. He became Lord Mayor on 29 October 1730, and was highly popular during his year of office. A portrait of him in hunting dress appeared on the first page of the ‘Grub Street Journal’ for 3 December with verses in Latin, French, and English, and, on each side, ‘The character of a good Lord Mayor drawn by the late Dr. Atterbury, Bishop of Rochester.’ Parsons was very active opposing Walpole's excise bill both in the city and in Parliament, where he spoke describing some of the hardships which the excise laws put upon the brewers. He was re-elected MP for the City of London at the top of the poll at the 1734 general election.

Parsons had the unusual distinction of being elected Lord Mayor a second time on 22 October 1740. (cf. Journal of the Shrievalty of Richard Hoare, Esq., in the years 1740–1741, Bath, 1815). His pageant was of unusual splendor as he was the first lord mayor to ride in the state coach drawn by six horses gaily decorated with trappings. On this occasion the following broadsides were printed: ‘A new Song made on … Humphrey Parsons, Esquire, now our great and good Lord Mayor’ (British Museum, 1872, a. [170]), and ‘Whittington revived, or a City in triumph, on Alderman Parsons being chosen twice Lord Mayor of London’ (British Museum, 1876. f. 1. [120]).

== Home and family ==
Besides his ‘mansion-house,’ called The Hermitage, which probably adjoined his brewery at St. Katherine's in the eastern district of the city, Parsons inherited the family estates at Reigate on his father's death in 1717. These comprised Reigate Priory, purchased by Sir John from the niece of Viscount Avalon under an act of parliament obtained for the purpose on 16 April 1677 and Dorking Priory, the tithes of which, producing 160l. yearly, he settled on his wife as her jointure. He also possessed the advowson of Mickleham rectory. He married, on 18 April 1719, Sarah Crowley, the daughter of Sir Ambrose Crowley, by whom he had a son John and two daughters — Sarah, who married James Dunn of Dublin, and Anne, who married Sir John Hynde Cotton, 4th Baronet. His wife died on 28 January 1759.

== Death and legacy ==
Parsons died during his second mayoralty, on 21 March 1741. His will, dated 29 April 1725, with a codicil of 25 March 1740, was proved in the prerogative court of Canterbury on 24 March 1741 (Spurway, 97). All his property was devised to his wife and three children, the portions of the latter during their minority being held by his wife as trustee on their behalf. After his death his family seem to have lived much in Paris. At the lord mayor's ball in October 1741, Horace Walpole noted the presence of ‘the Parsons family from Paris, who are admired too;’ and adds in a note that they were the son and daughter of Alderman Parsons, ‘a Jacobite brewer.’ Goldsmith, in his ‘Description of an Author's Bed-chamber,’ celebrates ‘Parsons's black champaign.’ An elegy ‘To the Memory of Humphry Parsons, Esquire, who died 21 March 1741. By J. B., S.E.M.M.,’ was published as a large copperplate engraving. A tablet inscribed with the elegy is surmounted by a group of allegorical figures which surround the bust of Parsons. It is designed and drawn by H. Gravelot, and engraved by G. Scotin. There are two mezzotint three-quarter-length portraits of Parsons: one in his robes as lord mayor, published by W. Banks; the other painted by Ellys in 1730, and engraved by Faber. There is also a large allegorical plate in praise of, and dedicated to, Parsons, with a portrait in a medallion engraved by W. P.

Parliament of Great Britain
Preceded by Sir Philip Parker-a-Morley-Long, Bt; Thomas Heath	Member of Parliament for Harwich; 1722–1727; With: Sir Philip Parker-a-Morley-Long, Bt	Succeeded by Sir Philip Parker-a-Morley-Long, Bt; John Perceval
Preceded by Richard Lockwood; Sir John Barnard; Francis Child; Richard Hopkins	Member of Parliament for City of London; 1727–1741; With: Sir John Barnard 1727-1741; Sir John Eyles, Bt 1727-1734; Micajah Perry 1727-1741; Robert Willimot 1734-1741	Succeeded by Sir John Barnard; George Heathcote; Daniel Lambert; Robert Godschall
Civic offices
Preceded by Sir Richard Brocas	Lord Mayor of London; 1730–1731	Succeeded by Sir Francis Child
Preceded by Sir John Salter	Lord Mayor of London; 1740–1741	Succeeded by Sir Daniel Lambert
