= Benjamin Haskins-Stiles =

British politician (c.1684 – 1739)

Benjamin Haskins-Stiles (c.1684 - 4 April 1739), of Bowden Park, near Chippenham, Wiltshire and Moor Park, Hertfordshire, was an English landowner and politician who sat in the House of Commons from 1721 to 1734.

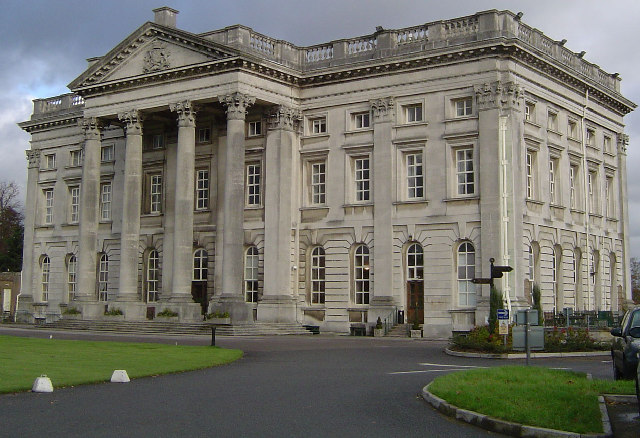
Moor Park Mansion, Hertfordshire

Haskins-Styles was the eldest son of Joseph Haskins Stiles, a sometime Amsterdam merchant and his wife Sarah Eyles, eldest daughter of Sir John Eyles, MP. After inheriting both his father's and younger brother Joseph's fortunes (1714 and 1719 respectively) he acquired several estates in Wiltshire, including Bowden Park, near Devizes and Calne manor and Moor Park, Hertfordshire, where he commissioned Giacomo Leoni and Sir James Thornhill to remodel the house as a Palladian mansion.

Haskins-Stiles was returned as Member of Parliament (MP) for Devizes at a by-election on 8 February 1721, replacing his uncle Francis Eyles, who had been expelled from Parliament as a director of the failed South Sea Company. At the 1722 general election he was returned for Devizes and Calne and chose to sit for Devizes as a petition was outstanding at Calne. He was returned unopposed again for Devizes in 1727, but did not stand at the 1734 general election.

Haskins-Stiles married twice, but left no surviving children. He died on 4 April 1739. He and his wife were laid to rest somewhere outside the Orangery. Moor Park was sold to Admiral George Anson, 1st Baron Anson in 1754.

Parliament of Great Britain
Preceded by Josiah Diston; Francis Eyles	Member of Parliament for Devizes; 1721–1734; With: Josiah Diston 1721-1722; Sir Joseph Eyles 1722-1727; Francis Eyles 1727-1734	Succeeded by Francis Eyles; Sir Joseph Eyles
Preceded by Sir Orlando Bridgeman; Richard Chiswell	Member of Parliament for Calne; 1722–1723; With: George Duckett	Succeeded by Edmund Pike Heath; George Duckett
