= Giles Earle (politician) =

British Army officer and politician

Giles Earle (1678 – 20 August 1758), was a British Army officer and politician who sat in the House of Commons for 32 years from 1715 to 1747. He had a reputation as a wit.

== Early life ==
Earle came from a family resident at Eastcourt, Crudwell, near Malmesbury, Wiltshire. He was the sixth son of Sir Thomas Earle, MP and mayor of Bristol, and his wife Elizabeth Ellinor Jackson, daughter of Joseph Jackson. He was admitted at Middle Temple in 1692. He was the brother of Joseph Earle. Earle's father bequeathed him the lands of Crudwell in 1696. He married Elizabeth Lowther, widow of William Lowther and daughter of Sir William Rawlinson, serjeant-at-law, by licence dated 20 May 1702.

He joined the army and was a captain in the 33rd Foot in 1702, and captain in the Royal Horse Guards from 1711 to 1717. He served under John, the second duke of Argyll, who was distinguished both in war and in politics. Earle was commissary of musters in Spain in 1711 and commissary-general of provisions in Spain in 1711 and at Minorca from 1712 to 1717.

== Political career ==
On the accession of George I Earle entered into political life, and was elected Member of Parliament for Chippenham at the 1715 general election. Earle's connection to the Duke of Argyle had lasted for twenty years, and was so marked that Sir Robert Walpole, in a letter written in 1716, styled him 'the Duke of Argyll's Earle'. Through his intimacy with the Duke of Argyll, who was Groom of the Stole to the Prince of Wales, he exerted himself in the autumn of 1716 in promoting addresses of congratulation from Gloucestershire and the adjacent counties to the prince on his success as regent during the absence of George I in Hanover. He voted against the government in 1717 and in consequence lost his post in Minorca. However, for his services in support of the Prince of Wales, he was rewarded in 1718 with the post of Groom of the bedchamber to the Prince of Wales. He resigned this position in 1720, when public differences broke out between the prince and his father, and took a post under the Duke of Argyll as Clerk of Board of Green Cloth.

At the general election of 1722 Earle stood for Parliament at Malmesbury where he was defeated in the poll, but seated on petition on 13 December 1722. He was returned unopposed at the 1727 general election and through Walpole became chairman of committee of privileges and elections. In 1728 was made a commissioner of Irish revenue. He was returned unopposed again for Malmesbury at the 1734 general election. In 1737, he replaced Sir George Oxenden when Oxenden was deprived of his lordship of the treasury and he retained its emoluments until 1742. His readiness to do the minister's bidding ingratiated him with Walpole, to whom he was an acceptable companion although he was personally unpopular.

Lord Chesterfield, when Walpole's fall seemed probable, wrote, with allusion to Earle, that "the court generally proposes some servile and shameless tool of theirs to be chairman of the committee of privileges and elections. Why should not we therefore pick out some whig of a fair character and with personal connections to oppose the ministerial nominee?". These tactics were adopted. The ministry proposed Earle, though some thought that his unpopularity would have led to the selection of another candidate, and the opposition proposed Dr Lee. The struggle came off on 15 December 1741, when Earle was beaten by four votes, polling 238 to 242 for his opponent. Earle's name then dropped out of sight. He was defeated in a contest at Malmesbury at the 1747 general election.

== Reputation ==
Earle's sordid nature and broad jokes were the subject of universal comment, and his jests are said to have been "set off by a whining tone, crabbed face, and very laughing eyes". Two dialogues between "G——s E——e and B——b D——n" (Earle and Bubb Dodington) were published, one in 1741 and the other in 1743; the former, written by Sir C. Hanbury Williams, conveyed a "lively image of Earle's style and sentiments", and in both of them the shameless political conduct of this pair of intriguers was vividly displayed. Three of Earle's letters to Mrs Howard, afterwards the Countess of Suffolk, are in the Suffolk Letters. Lady Mary Wortley Montagu speaks of him as 'a facetious gentleman, vulgarly called Tom Earle. ... His toast was always "God bless you, whatever becomes of me"'.

== Family ==
Earle died at his seat, Eastcourt House, Crudwell, on 20 August 1758, aged 80. He had issue Eleanor and William Rawlinson. The latter, who was also a member of parliament and a placeman, died in 1774, aged 72, and was buried near his sister in the vault of his grandfather at Hendon, Middlesex. A monument in Crudwell Church records the names of Giles Earle and his descendants to 1771.

Parliament of Great Britain
Preceded by Sir John Eyles; John Norris	Member of Parliament for Chippenham; 1715–1722; With: Sir John Eyles	Succeeded by Sir John Eyles; Edward Rolt
Preceded by Sir John Rushout; The Viscount Hillsborough	Member of Parliament for Malmesbury; 1722–1747; With: John Fermor 1722–1723; Charles Stewart 1723–1727; William Rawlinson Earle 1727–1747	Succeeded by John Lee; James Douglas
