= John Barnard (politician) =

British merchant and politician

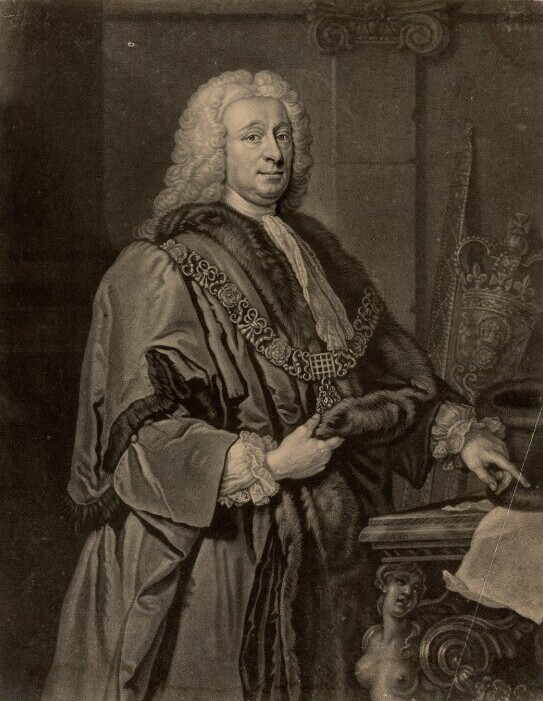
c. 1739 engraving of Barnard by John Faber the Younger

Sir John Barnard (1685 – 28 August 1764) was a British merchant and Whig politician who served as the Lord Mayor of London in 1738.

== Early life ==
Barnard was the son of a Quaker merchant from Reading, Berkshire, also named John Barnard and his wife, Sarah, daughter of Robert Payne of Play Hatch in Oxfordshire part of Sonning. He abandoned the Quakers early in his life, and is said to have been baptised into the Anglican faith by Henry Compton, Bishop of London.

The younger John Barnard initially worked alongside his father as a London City merchant. He was elected at the 1722 general election as one of the four members of parliament (MPs) for the City of London.

== Political career ==
Barnard was a vigorous campaigner for the commercial interests that were his principal City of London constituency. In 1734 he successfully promoted an Act of Parliament (7 Geo. 2. c. 8) "to prevent the infamous practice of Stock-Jobbing". This Act, which was renewed in 1737, later became known as "Sir John Barnard's Act" in recognition of his efforts. He was selected one of the two Sheriffs of London for 1736–37.

His campaign for City interests continued in the Parliament of 1737, with proposed legislation to reduce interest payments on the national debt, thereby lowering commercial taxation. A further clause would have introduced a Playhouse Act to regulate operation of theatres in the City of London, the disorderly operation of which posed risks of local theft or property damage. Both measures were defeated by the parliamentary majority headed by Sir Robert Walpole. Nonetheless, Barnard's advocacy was rewarded via election as Lord Mayor of London later in the year.

The defeat of Barnard's bills cemented his political opposition to Walpole's administration. From 1738 he joined a faction headed by Henry St John, 1st Viscount Bolingbroke which rejected Walpole's entire legislative programme. He did not take part in his faction's proclaimed secession from parliament in 1738, but did continue to speak against the government as opportunities arose, including on the proposed resolution of European disputes ahead of what would become the War of the Austrian Succession.

On this subject in March 1738, Barnard offered a philosophy of foreign relations opposed to Walpole's attempts to reach a negotiated settlement:

A dishonourable peace is worse than a destructive war...All nations are apt to play the bully with respect to one another; and if the government or administration of a nation has taken but one insult tamely, their neighbours will from thence judge of the character of that nation...and will accordingly treat them as bullies do noted poltroons; they will kick and cuff them upon every occasion.

Walpole resigned as Prime Minister in February 1742. Barnard was subsequently a supporter of the proposal for an enquiry to investigate Walpole's actions over the preceding ten years with a view to making charges of corruption. He was one of the 21 members named to the enquiry, but little progress was made as most of those called as witnesses refused to testify. The only substantive allegation – that of bribing electors in the districts of Wendover and Orford – failed when it became clear the evidence was essentially hearsay. Barnard supported a subsequent motion to introduce a Bill of Indemnity pardoning witnesses from any crimes if they testified against Walpole or his Ministers, but the legislation was defeated in the House of Lords.

== Death ==
Barnard left Parliament at the 1761 general election, and died in 1764.

He is commemorated in an ornate bust displayed in the Temple of British Worthies at Lord Cobham's country house at Stowe, alongside similar statues of Elizabeth I and Sir Francis Drake.

Barnard Street in Savannah, Georgia, is named for him.

Parliament of Great Britain
Preceded by John Ward; Sir Thomas Scawen; Robert Heysham; Peter Godfrey	Member of Parliament for the City of London; 1722–1761; With: Peter Godfrey 1715–1724; Francis Child 1722–1727; Richard Lockwood 1722–1727; Richard Hopkins 1724–1727; Sir John Eyles 1727–1734; Micajah Perry 1727–1741; Humphry Parsons 1727–1741; Robert Willimot 1734–1741; Sir Robert Godschall 1741–1742; George Heathcote 1741–1747; Sir Daniel Lambert 1741–1747; Sir William Calvert 1742–54; Stephen Theodore Janssen 1747–1754; Slingsby Bethell 1747–1758; Sir Robert Ladbroke from 1754; William Beckford from 1754; Sir Richard Glyn from 1758	Succeeded by Thomas Harley; Sir Robert Ladbroke; William Beckford; Sir Richard Glyn, Bt
Civic offices
Preceded by Sir John Thompson	Lord Mayor of London; 1738–1739	Succeeded by Micajah Perry
