= Micajah Perry =

British tobacco merchant and politician

Micajah Perry (died 1753) was a British tobacco merchant and politician who sat in the House of Commons from 1727 to 1741. He was sheriff of the City of London in 1734 and Lord Mayor of London in 1738.

He was the son of Richard Perry, merchant, of Leadenhall Street, London, and his wife Sarah Heysham. Micajah's grandfather Micajah Perry was the most significant tobacco merchant in England, and an agent for Virginia. Perry's father died in 1720 and his grandfather in 1721, and he inherited the family business. He married Elizabeth Cocke, daughter of Richard Cocke, a London linen-draper. He became a member of the Haberdashers' Company.

Perry handled the affairs of the Virginia tobacco planters in London. He was frequently consulted about the colony by the Board of Trade. However, he lacked the business acumen of his grandfather, and progressively lost business. He achieved more success politically. At the 1727 general election he was elected Member of Parliament (MP) for the City of London, and also that year became Master of the Haberdashers' Company. He became a City Alderman for Aldgate on 24 February 1728. He was re-elected MP for the City at the 1734 general election, and was also Sheriff of London in 1734. However, with his business declining, he was forced that year to sell 'Hylands House', his large house in Epsom, although he retained a smaller house, 'The Hylands'. He also sold his quays and warehouses in the London docks in 1735. His wife died in October 1738, and was buried at Epsom.

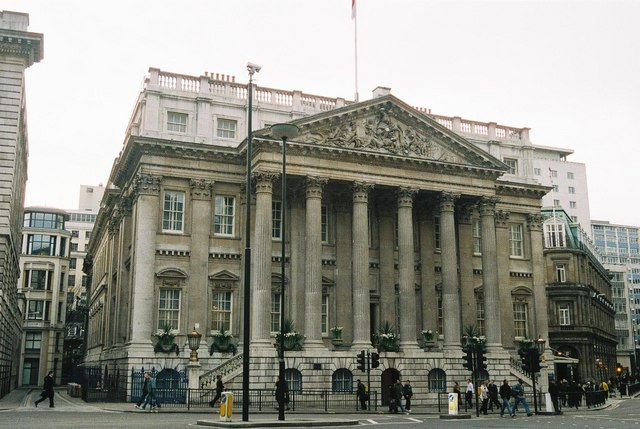
Mansion House

Perry became Lord Mayor of London for the year 1738 to 1739, and laid the foundation of the Mansion House during his mayoralty, on 25 October 1739. He was a colonel of the Orange Regiment from 1738 to 1745. At the 1741 general election, he lost his seat in Parliament.

By 1743 Perry was suffering ill-health from a dropsy, and was in a condition which made his friends fear for his life. He became unable to attend the meetings of the Corporation, and resigned his aldermancy in November 1746. He also found himself in financial difficulties, and was granted a pension of £200 p.a. by the court of aldermen.

Perry died without issue on 22 January 1753.

Parliament of Great Britain
Preceded by Richard Lockwood; Sir John Barnard; Francis Child; Richard Hopkins	Member of Parliament for City of London; 1727–1741; With: Sir John Barnard 1727-1741; Sir John Eyles, Bt 1727-1734; Humphrey Parsons 1727-1741; Robert Willimot 1734-1741	Succeeded by Sir John Barnard; George Heathcote; Daniel Lambert; Robert Godschall
Civic offices
Preceded by Sir John Barnard	Lord Mayor of London; 1738	Succeeded by Sir John Salter
