= William Rawlinson Earle =

British politician

William Rawlinson Earle (7 April 1702 - 10 August 1774), of Eastcourt House, Crudwell, near Malmesbury, Wiltshire, was a British politician who sat in the House of Commons for 40 years between 1727 and 1768.

Earle was the eldest son of Giles Earle and his wife Elizabeth Rawlinson, daughter of Sir William Rawlinson of Hendon House, Middlesex and widow of John Lowther of Lowther, Westmorland. He married, with £20,000, Susannah White, daughter of William White of Somerford, Wiltshire on 4 January 1731.

Earle was returned unopposed as Member of Parliament for Malmesbury together with his father at the 1727 British general election. He was a strong government supporter, and was appointed Clerk of deliveries to the Ordnance in 1732. He was returned unopposed again with his father at the 1734 general election and was promoted to Clerk of the Ordnance in 1740. At the 1741 British general election he was returned unopposed again with his father for Malmesbury and after the fall of Walpole in 1742 managed to hold onto his post at the ordnance for the rest of his life. At the 1747 British general election he and his father were defeated at Malmesbury but he also stood as a ministerial candidate for Cricklade where he was returned unopposed as MP and continued to support the Administration.

Earle was returned unopposed as MP for Cricklade at the 1754 British general election but was defeated after an expensive contest at the 1761 British general election. He had succeeded his father in 1758. He was found a seat at Newport, Isle of Wight, at a by-election on 7 April 1762. He was active in Parliament but apparently inconsistent in his allegiances. He did not stand at the 1768 British general election and resigned from the Ordnance in 1772.

Earle died on 10 August 1774 leaving a son and three daughters.

Parliament of Great Britain
Preceded by Giles Earle; Charles Stewart	Member of Parliament for Maidstone; 1727–1747; With: Giles Earle	Succeeded by John Lee; James Douglas
Preceded by Sir Thomas Reade; Welbore Ellis	Member of Parliament for Cricklade; 1747–1761; With: John Gore 1747-1754; Thomas Gore 1754-1761	Succeeded by Arnold Nesbitt; Thomas Gore
Preceded by Rear-Admiral Charles Holmes; Thomas Lee Dummer	Member of Parliament for Newport (Isle of Wight); 1762–1768; With: Thomas Lee Dummer 1762-1765; Thomas Dummer 1765-1768	Succeeded by John Eames; Hans Sloane
