= James Douglas (died 1751) =

British politician

James Douglas (died 2 June 1751) was a British politician.

Douglas succeeded Henry Vane, 1st Earl of Darlington as the Member of Parliament for St. Mawes from 1741 to 1747 and for Malmesbury from 1747 until his death in 1751. He was a younger son of James Douglas, a merchant in London, of the family of Douglas of Friarshaw, and his wife (née Russell). He married Albinia, daughter of Major-General William Farrington and widow of Robert Bertie, 1st Duke of Ancaster; she died on 29 July 1745.

Parliament of Great Britain
Preceded by Henry Vane; Richard Plumer	Member of Parliament for St. Mawes; 1741–1747; With: Robert Nugent	Succeeded by Robert Nugent; The Lord Sundon
Preceded by Giles Earle; William Rawlinson Earle	Member of Parliament for Malmesbury; 1747–1751; With: John Lee	Succeeded by John Lee; Lord Edward Digby
