= Michelle Driedger =

Métis Canadian health scientist

- Born: Winnipeg, Manitoba, Canada

Academic background
- Education: BA, Geography, 1995, University of Winnipeg; MA, Geography, 1997, Carleton University; PhD, Geography and Geology, 2001, McMaster University
- Thesis: From science to policy practice and public discourse: claimsmaking and chlorinated drinking water (2003)
- Doctoral advisor: John D. Eyles

Academic work
- Institutions: University of Manitoba College of Medicine; University of Ottawa

Suzanne Michelle Driedger is a Métis Canadian health scientist. She is a professor at the University of Manitoba College of Medicine and former Canada Research Chair in Environment and Health Risk Communications. In 2023, Driedger was named a Fellow of the Royal Society of Canada for her research in public health risk communication.

== Early life and education ==
Driedger completed her Bachelor of Arts degree in geography at the University of Winnipeg in 1995. She then enrolled at Carleton University for her Master's degree in geography and McMaster University for her PhD in the same subject. Her thesis at McMaster was written under the advisement of John D. Eyles. Upon earning her PhD, Driedger completed a postdoctoral fellowship at McMaster with Susan Elliott.

== Career ==
Upon completing her fellowship, Driedger joined the faculty at the University of Ottawa's Department of Geography from 2002 to 2005. She left the institution in 2006 upon accepting a Tier 2 Canada Research Chair in Environment and Health Risk Communications at the University of Manitoba College of Medicine. While at the University of Manitoba, Driedger has often collaborated with the Manitoba Metis Federation for her research on decolonizing methodologies in community based research. Her Canada Research Chair was renewed in 2012.

In 2023, Driedger was named a Fellow of the Royal Society of Canada for her research in public health risk communication.

=== Pandemic responses ===
During the 2009 swine flu pandemic, Driedger studied the responses of First Nations communities to the vaccine rollout program instituted by the government. She found there was more hesitancy among these communities given their lack of trust in the government. In her paper Factors influencing H1N1 vaccine behavior among Manitoba Metis in Canada: a qualitative study, Driedger reported that the most negatively influential factors cited by participants were a lack of knowledge about the vaccine and the pandemic as well as concerns about vaccine safety.

At the beginning of the COVID-19 pandemic, Driedger received funding for her study: "The paradox of precaution: Examining public health COVID-19 outbreak management strategies." The aim of this study was to collect data and help inform public health response efforts in Indigenous communities while the outbreaks were occurring. During the COVID-19 vaccine rollout, Driedger partnered with the Manitoba Métis Federation to study COVID-19 vaccination messaging. They specifically investigated the impact the government's decision not to include Métis people had on vaccination rates. Overall, Driedger found that public messaging about the vaccine did little to combat specific anxieties elicited by the novel vaccines.
