= Eyles-Stiles baronets =

Baronetcy in the Baronetage of the United Kingdom

Arms of Eyles: Argent, a fess engrailed sable in chief three fleurs-de-lys of the last

The Eyles, later Eyles-Stiles Baronetcy, of London, was a title in the Baronetage of Great Britain. It was created on 1 December 1714 for the merchant and director of the Honourable East India Company, Francis Eyles. The second baronet was Lord Mayor of London from 1726 to 1727. He married Mary, daughter of Joseph Haskins Stiles of Moor Park, Rickmansworth, and their son, the third baronet, assumed the additional surname of Stiles. The title became extinct on the death of the fourth baronet in 1768.

Sir John Eyles, elder brother of the first baronet, was Lord Mayor of London in 1688.

== Eyles, later Eyles-Stiles Baronets, of London (1714) ==
- Sir Francis Eyles, 1st Baronet (died 1716)
- Sir John Eyles, 2nd Baronet (1683–1745)
- Sir Francis Haskins Eyles-Stiles, 3rd Baronet (died 1762)
- Sir John Haskins Eyles-Stiles, 4th Baronet (1741–1768)

== Extended family ==
Sir Joseph Eyles, fourth son of the first baronet, was Member of Parliament for Devizes and Southwark.

== See also ==
- List of extinct baronetcies

Baronetage of Great Britain
Preceded by Humphreys baronets	Eyles baronets of London; 1 December 1714	Succeeded by Smyth baronets
