= Francis Eyles (died 1735) =

English Whig politician (c. 1679 – 1735)

Francis Eyles (c. 1679 – 19 December 1735), of Essex Street, London, and Earnshill, near Taunton, Somerset, was an English Whig politician who sat in the House of Commons from 1715 to 1721.

Eyles was the son of Sir John Eyles of Southbroom, Wiltshire, briefly Lord Mayor of London in 1688.

Eyles was returned unopposed as Member of Parliament (MP) for Devizes at the 1715 general election and generally supported the Government. He was a director of the South Sea Company, and when the South Sea Bubble burst, he was expelled from the House on 28 January 1721. He was also included in the list of directors whose estates were to be confiscated for the relief of the victims. However, treated relatively leniently by Parliament, he was allowed to keep £20,000 of the value of his estates, but prevented from either sitting in Parliament again or holding public office.

Eyles died in 1735, leaving no children. He left the remainder of his personal estate to his nephew Francis.

Preceded by Robert Child; John Nicholas	Member of Parliament for Devizes; 1715–1721; With: Josiah Diston	Succeeded by Josiah Diston; Benjamin Haskins-Stiles
