= Joseph Eyles =

English merchant, financier and Whig politician (c. 1690–1740)

Arms of Eyles: Argent, a fess engrailed sable in chief three fleurs-de-lys of the last

Sir Joseph Eyles (c. 1690–8 February 1740), of Bishopsgate in the City of London, was an English merchant, financier and Whig politician who sat in the House of Commons from 1722 to 1740.

== Origins ==
He was the younger son of Sir Francis Eyles, 1st Baronet (died 1716). His elder brother was Sir John Eyles, 2nd Baronet, also a director of the East India Company.

== Career ==
He was a Turkey Merchant and held extensive commercial interests in the Mediterranean. He was a director of the East India Company 1714-17 and 1721–2, a director of the Bank of England from 1717 to 1721 and a sub-governor of the London Assurance Company.

At the 1722 British general election, Eyles was returned as a Member of Parliament for Devizes, a rotten borough controlled by his family. He voted with the Government in all recorded divisions. He was elected Sheriff of London for 1724 to 1725 and was master of the Haberdashers' Company for the same period. He was knighted on 9 December 1724.

At the 1727 British general election he was returned as member for Southwark. He became one of the Government's financial agents, and was again a director of the Bank of England from 1730 to 1733.

In July 1730, Pelham, paymaster of the forces, instructed the Treasury board that it should in future receive proposals from Sir Joseph Eyles for the remittances needed for the forces in Minorca, Gibraltar, and foreign service elsewhere. Eyles' only vote against the Government was on the Excise Bill in 1733, which both he and his elder brother, Sir John Eyles, 2nd Baronet, opposed. He was returned as an MP for Devizes at the 1734 general election. The only speech he is known to have made was on 30 March 1739, when he seconded a motion for the repeal of the Test Act.

He was an alderman of the City of London for Cheapside from 1739 to 1740. He died on 8 February 1740.

== Marriage and issue ==
He married Sarah Jefferies, a daughter of Sir Jeffrey Jefferies, by whom he had a son and two daughters.

Parliament of Great Britain
Preceded by Josiah Diston; Benjamin Haskins-Stiles	Member of Parliament for Devizes; 1727– 1727; With: Benjamin Haskins-Stiles	Succeeded by Francis Eyles; Benjamin Haskins-Stiles
Preceded by John Lade; Edmund Halsey	Member of Parliament for Southwark; 1727–1734; With: Edmund Halsey; Thomas Inwen	Succeeded by George Heathcote; Thomas Inwen
Preceded by Francis Eyles; Benjamin Haskins-Stiles	Member of Parliament for Devizes; 1734–1740; With: Francis Eyles	Succeeded by Francis Eyles; John Garth
