= Richard Lockwood (politician) =

British merchant and politician

Richard Lockwood (c. 1676–1756) of Dews Hall, near Maldon, Essex was a British merchant and politician who sat in the House of Commons between 1713 and 1741.

== Early life ==
Lockwood was the only surviving son of Richard Lockwood of Gayton, Northamptonshire, and his wife Susanna Cutts, daughter of Edward Cutts of Maldon, Essex. He was educated probably at Westminster School in 1684.

== Career ==
He became a wealthy merchant in the Turkish trade, and succeeded his father in about 1697. In 1711 he became an Assistant in the Levant Company and was also given an office as Gentleman of the Privy Chamber.

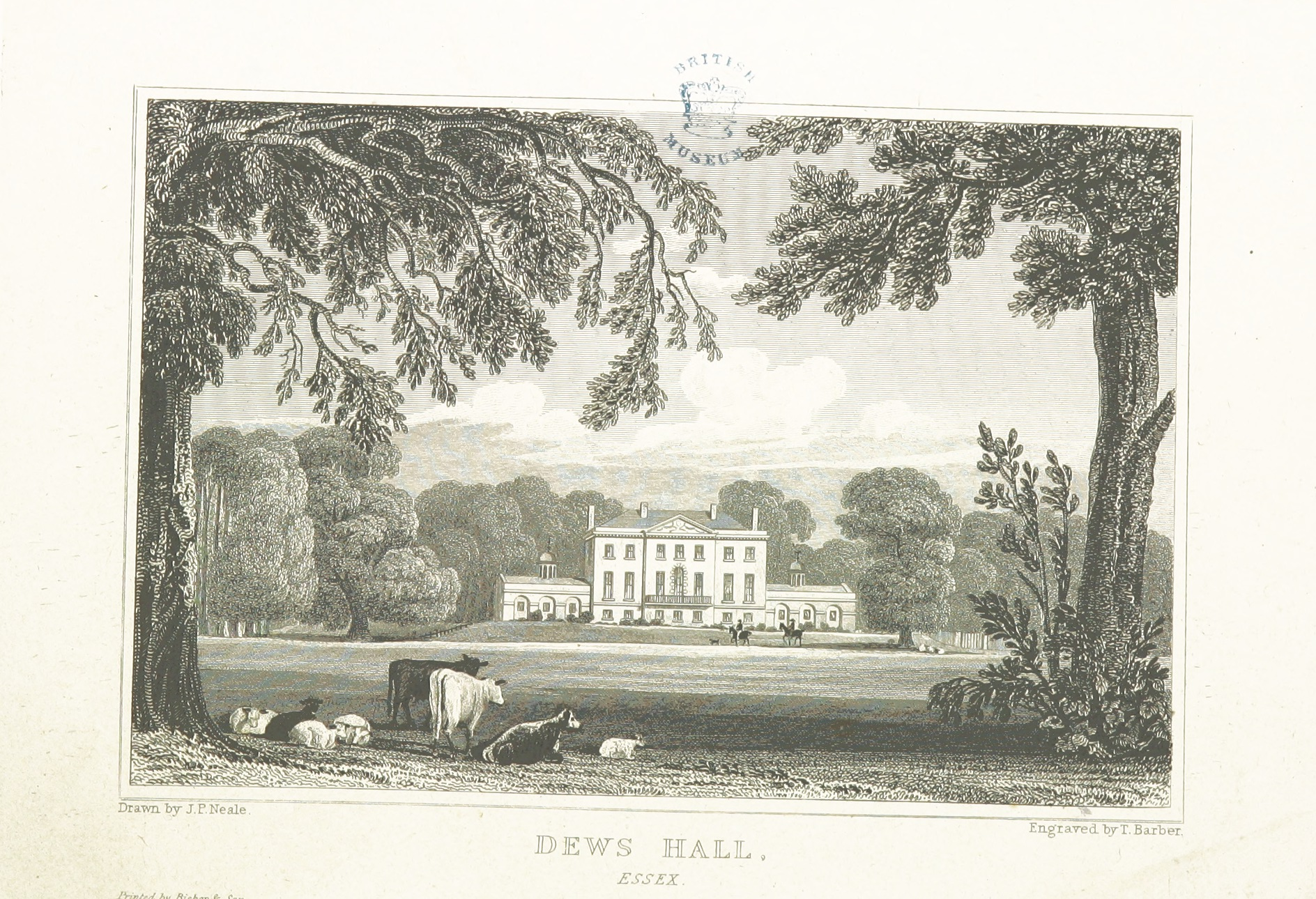
Dews Hall Essex in 1824

=== Political career ===
At the 1713 general election Lockwood was returned as Member of Parliament for Hindon. He was an outsider but stood on a joint ticket with the younger Reynolds Calthorpe, and it was possibly his wealth which accounted for the partnership. He was classed as a Whig because of his association with the Calthorpes, but was probably a closet Tory. He was Assistant to the Levant Company again from 1713 to 1715 while he was in Parliament. In June 1714 he stood in the ballot for the commission of public accounts, but did not get enough votes. Also, in 1714 he lost his post in the Household.

The Calthorpes opposed Lockwood at Hindon at the 1715 general election and he lost his seat. He also stood unsuccessfully for Worcester. Out of Parliament he became a Director of the Royal Exchange Assurance Corporation in 1720 and was an Assistant of the Royal African Company from 1720 to 1725. At the 1722 general election he topped the poll for the City of London. He had also made back up arrangements to stand at Minehead, but these fell through when it was found he had to be present at the poll, which was not possible with his London commitments. He was considered to be Jacobite supporter by the Pretender's agent in London. In 1725 the common council of the City thanked him for his ‘pains and applications’ in opposing the city of London elections bill. The affairs of the Royal African Company were to come before Parliament, and Lockwood and other MPs connected with it divested themselves of their stock so they could appear impartial. He became Director of the Royal African Company in 1726. He lost his London seat at the 1727 general election. In 1732 he became Deputy Governor of the Royal Exchange Aassurance Corporation.

Lockwood was returned as MP for Worcester after a contest at the 1734 general election and sat again as a Tory in the 1734 Parliament. In 1735 he bought the estate of Dews Hall in Essex. He spoke on the gin bill in 1736, voted against the Government on the Spanish convention in 1739 and the place bill in 1740, and opposed a bill concerned with frauds in marine insurance on 27 March 1740. He did not seek re-election at the 1741 general election and retired to Dews Hall. He enlarged and refronted the old brick building in the classical style.

== Personal life ==
By 1713, he had married Matilda Vernon, daughter of George Vernon of Sudbury, Derbyshire and sister to Henry Vernon. Together, they were the parents of:

- Richard Lockwood (1712-1797), who married his first cousin, Anne Catherine Vernon, daughter of Henry Vernon and sister to George Venables-Vernon, 1st Baron Vernon.

Lockwood died on 30 August 1756, aged 80. Dews Hall descended to his eldest son Richard.

Parliament of Great Britain
Preceded by Henry Lee Warner; Edmund Lambert	Member of Parliament for Hindon; 1713–1715; With: Reynolds Calthorpe, the younger	Succeeded by Major-General George Wade; Reynolds Calthorpe
Preceded by John Ward; Sir Thomas Scawen; Robert Heysham; Peter Godfrey	Member of Parliament for the City of London; 1722–1727; With: Peter Godfrey 1722–1724; Sir John Barnard1722–1727; Francis Child 1722–1727; Richard Hopkins 1724–1727	Succeeded by Sir John Eyles; Micajah Perry; Humphry Parsons; Sir John Barnard
Preceded by Sir Richard Lane; Samuel Sandys, later Baron Sandys	Member of Parliament for Worcester; 1734–1741; With: Samuel Sandys, later Baron Sandys	Succeeded by Thomas Winnington; Samuel Sandys, later Baron Sandys
