= Robert Willimot =

British politician

Sir Robert Willimot (died 1746), of Banstead, Surrey, was a British politician who sat in the House of Commons from 1734 to 1741. He was Lord Mayor of London in 1742.

Willimot was an underwriter in the City of London. He married, at St Olave, Hart Street, by licence dated 5 February 1715, Elizabeth Lambert, daughter of John Lambert of Garratts Hall, in Banstead, Surrey.

Willimot was a Common Councillor for Tower Ward from 1729 to 1736. At the 1734 general election, he was elected Tory Member of Parliament for the City of London. He made his first reported speech on the navy estimates on 7 February 1735. On 19 March 1735 he reported on the conclusions of a committee appointed to find ways of preventing wool smuggling from England and Ireland to the continent. He became a member of the Coopers Company in 1736 and was elected alderman, for Lime Street, on 28 January 1736, remaining for the rest of his life. In 1736 he voted against the Westminster Bridge bill.

Willimot supported a merchants’ petition on Spanish depredations on 3 March 1738, with a letter in his hand giving details of English sailors held in chains by the Spaniards. In March 1739, he spoke and voted against the Spanish convention.. He was thanked by the common council for his support of the place bill on 18 June 1740. In March 1741 he opposed a bill concerning frauds in marine insurance, which was eventually dropped. He did not stand at the 1741 general election and concentrated his efforts on City affairs. He was elected Sheriff of London for the year 1741 to 1742, and became president of the Bridewell and Bethlehem Hospitals in 1741. He continued serving on several committees of the corporation of London, which included those set up to prepare a petition on merchants’ losses in January 1742, and to draw up instructions for the London MPs in February 1742.

Willimot was selected to be Lord Mayor of London and he decided to follow practice and to translate to one of the twelve higher Companies, choosing the Clothworkers' Company. Although he was accepted, it was only by a small majority, with many objections, and he was refused use of the Clothworkers Hall. As a result, he decided to investigate the validity of the custom, and consulted leading lawyers on the matter. They all agreed that it was not necessary to be a freeman of one of the twelve to become Lord Mayor, although it was necessary to do so in order to be President of the Irish Committee. He decided not to bother with the Clothworkers' Company, or to any other of the twelve, and so ended a custom which had been observed for many years. He was Lord Mayor for the year 1742 to 1743 and was Master of the Coopers Company in 1743. At the conclusion of his term of office, he was thanked by the common council of the city for his ‘constant attendance’, his ‘judicious and faithful discharge of his duties’, for the ‘easy access given to his fellow citizens’, and for the ‘frequent opportunities he gave’ for the council to meet and deal with the public business of the city. He was knighted on 18 February 1744 when presenting the city's loyal address to the King, which was on a threatened French invasion.

Willimot lived at Banstead and died on 19 December 1746. He was buried at All Saints Banstead on 26 December 1746. He had three daughters of whom at least one predeceased him.

Parliament of Great Britain
Preceded by Sir John Barnard; Sir John Eyles; Micajah Perry; Humphry Parsons	Member of Parliament for the City of London; 1734–1741; With: Sir John Barnard; Micajah Perry; Humphry Parsons	Succeeded by Sir John Barnard; George Heathcote; Sir Daniel Lambert; Sir Robert Godshall
Civic offices
Preceded by George Heathcote	Lord Mayor of London; 1742-1743	Succeeded by Sir Robert Westley
