= Sir John Eyles, 2nd Baronet =

British financier and politician (1683–1745)

Sir John Eyles Bt
- Arms of Eyles: Argent, a fess engrailed sable in chief three fleurs-de-lys of the last

Member of the Great Britain Parliament for Chippenham
- In office 1713–1727 Serving with: John Norris 1713–1715; Giles Earle 1715–1722; Edward Rolt 1722–1723; Thomas Boucher 1723–1727
- Preceded by: Francis Popham; Sir James Long
- Succeeded by: Rogers Holland; Gabriel Roberts

Member of the Great Britain Parliament for City of London
- In office 1727–1734 Serving with: Sir John Barnard; Micajah Perry; Humphry Parsons
- Preceded by: Richard Lockwood; Sir John Barnard; Francis Child; Richard Hopkins
- Succeeded by: Robert Willimot; Sir John Barnard; Micajah Perry; Humphry Parsons

Lord Mayor of London
- In office 1726–1727
- Preceded by: Sir Francis Forbes
- Succeeded by: Sir Edward Becher

Personal details
- Born: 1683
- Died: 11 March 1745
- Resting place: St Helen's Bishopsgate
- Party: Whig
- Parent: Sir Francis Eyles, 1st Baronet (father)
- Relatives: Joseph Eyles (brother)

Sir John Eyles, 2nd Baronet (1683 – 11 March 1745) of Gidea Hall in Essex, was a British financier and politician who sat in the House of Commons from 1713 to 1734. He was Lord Mayor of London in 1726. He served as a Director of the East India Company 1710-14 and again 1717-21 and was appointed a sub-governor of the South Sea Company in 1721.

== Origins ==
Eyles was the second but eldest surviving son of Sir Francis Eyles, 1st Baronet by his wife Elizabeth Ayley, a daughter of Richard Ayley, a merchant in the City of London. His younger brother was Joseph Eyles, MP. He succeeded to his father's baronetcy on 24 May 1716 and became Master of the Haberdashers Company and Alderman of Vintry on 19 June 1716.

== Career ==
=== Political career ===
Eyles was elected as Whig Member of Parliament for Chippenham at the 1713 general election. He was elected MP for Chippenham again at the 1715 general election and voted consistently with the government.

He was appointed Sheriff of London for 1720.

At the 1722 general election he was returned unopposed at Chippenham.

He was knighted in December 1724 and served as Lord Mayor of London for the year 1726 to 1727.

At the 1727 general election he was elected MP for the City of London. At the 1734 general election Eyles did not stand for the City of London and was defeated at Chippenham.

He became alderman for Bridge Without (a ward previously represented by his father) from 22 July 1737.

=== Bank of England ===
From 1715 to 1717 he was a director of the Bank of England. Also in 1716, he was appointed one of the commissioners to oversee estates forfeited to the Crown during the unsuccessful Jacobite rising of 1715, a post he held until 1725.

=== East India Company ===
Eyles was a Director of the East India Company from 1710 to 1714. From 1717 to 1721 he served another term as Director of the East India Company.

=== South Sea Company ===
Eyles was appointed a sub-governor of the slaving South Sea Company in February 1721 in the aftermath of the South Sea Bubble. In 1725, Eyles was on the Company court of directors.

=== Other ventures ===
Eyles was also appointed president of St. Thomas's Hospital in 1737, and Joint Postmaster-General in 1739, holding both posts for the rest of his life.

== Gidea Hall ==
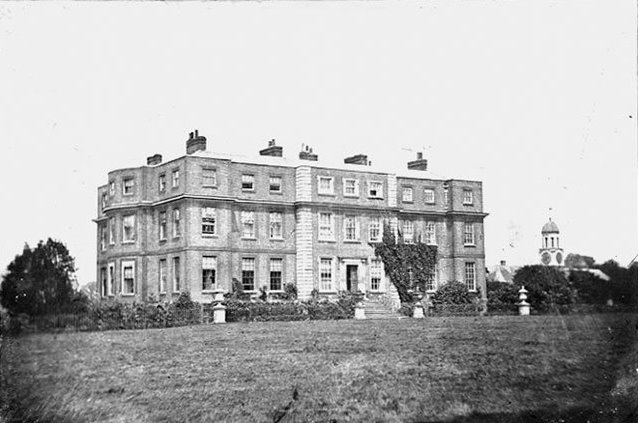
Gidea Hall, Essex in 1908

Eyles purchased the estate of Gidea Hall, in Havering, demolished the old mansion there in 1720, and built a new "elegant" house.

In 1731, Eyles was the dedicatee of George Lillo's tragedy The London Merchant, a play later excerpted in French by Abbé Prévost who had served as Sir John's secretary and tutor to his son Francis.

== Marriage and issue ==
He married Mary Haskin Styles (d.1735), the daughter of his first cousin Sarah Eyles (daughter of Sir John Eyles, elder brother of the first baronet.) by her husband Joseph Haskin Styles. Mary died on 14 November 1735, and was buried at St Helen's Bishopsgate 9 days later. By his wife he had issue one son and one daughter, including:

- Sir Francis Haskins Eyles-Stiles, 3rd Baronet (d.1762), eldest son and heir.

== Death ==
He died on 11 March 1745.

Parliament of Great Britain
Preceded by Francis Popham; Sir James Long	Member of Parliament for Chippenham; 1713–1727; With: John Norris 1713–1715; Giles Earle 1715–1722; Edward Rolt 1722–1723; Thomas Boucher 1723–1727	Succeeded by Rogers Holland; Gabriel Roberts
Preceded by Richard Lockwood; Sir John Barnard; Francis Child; Richard Hopkins	Member of Parliament for the City of London; 1727–1734; With: Sir John Barnard; Micajah Perry; Humphry Parsons	Succeeded by Robert Willimot; Sir John Barnard; Micajah Perry; Humphry Parsons
Civic offices
Preceded by Sir Francis Forbes	Lord Mayor of London; 1726–1727	Succeeded by Sir Edward Becher
Baronetage of Great Britain
Preceded by Francis Eyles	Baronet (of London); 1716–1745	Succeeded by Francis Eyles-Stiles
