= Worshipful Company of Coopers =

Livery company of the City of London

Coordinates: 51.51679°N 0.07925°W

- Motto: Love as Brethren
- Location: Coopers' Hall, 13 Devonshire Square, London EC2M 4TH
- Date of formation: 1501; Royal Charter; Henry VII of England
- Company association: Cooperage
- Order of precedence: 36th
- Website: Coopers' Company

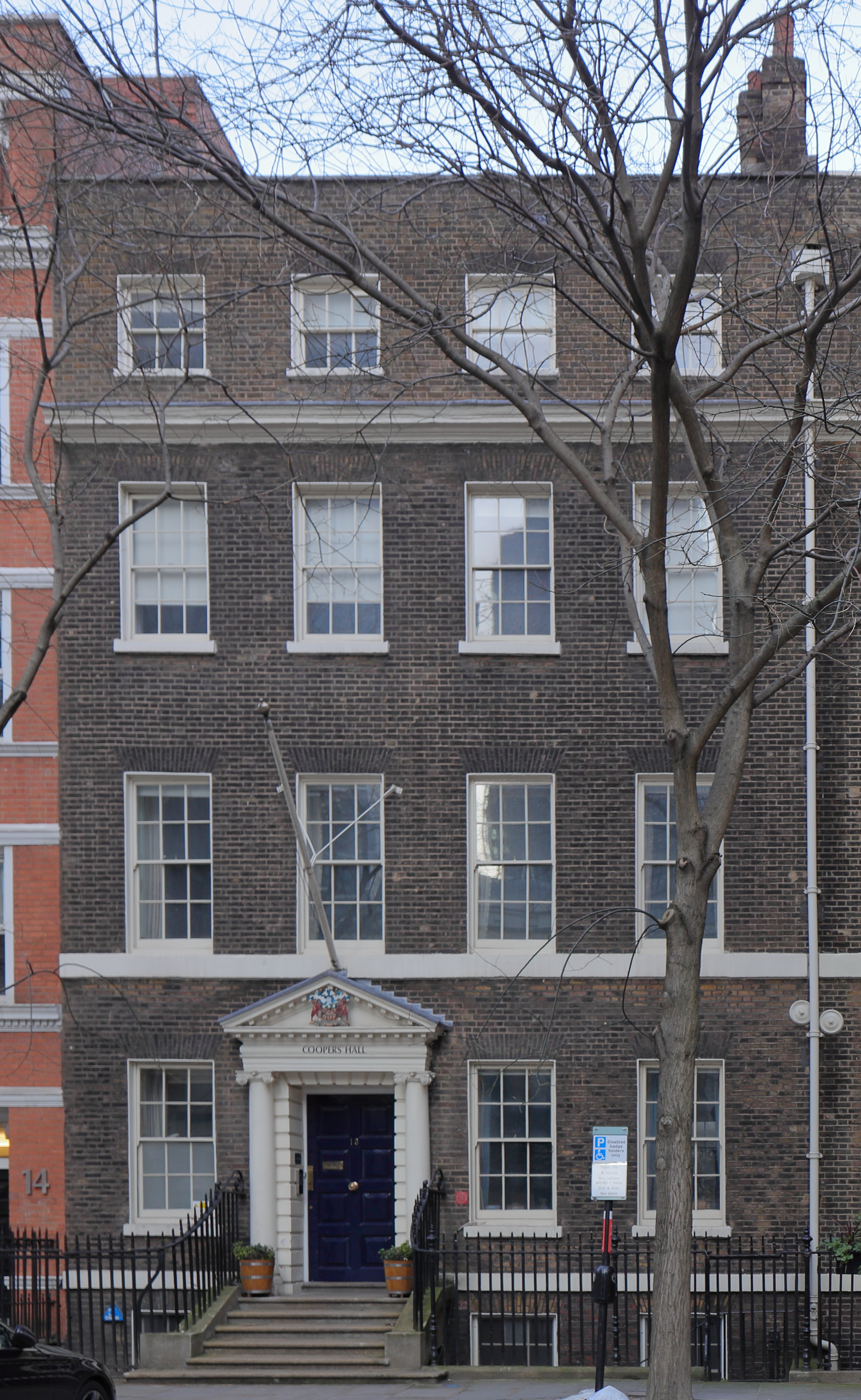
The current Coopers' Hall in Devonshire Square

The Worshipful Company of Coopers is one of the livery companies of the City of London. The organisation of coopers existed in 1422; the Company received its first royal charter of incorporation in 1501. The cooper trade involved the making of wine, beer, and spirit casks (a barrel is specifically a 36-gallon cask, or 32 in some circumstances); the Livery Company also functions as a charitable foundation, and supports two education establishments: the Coopers' Company and Coborn School of Upminster, Essex, and Strode's College of Egham, Surrey. The former was founded in the Ratcliffe area of London in 1536 and donated to the Company who have been involved with it ever since.

The Coopers' Company ranks 36th in the order of precedence of the 113 livery companies. Its motto is Love as Brethren.

== History ==
Middle Ages

1298: Coopers faced fines for contempt of the King and Mayor.

1299: Acquisition of original deed of land in Basinghall Street.

1396: Request to Mayor for regulation against improper vessel construction.

1409: Decree for liquor vessels to be made solely of pure wood.

1420–1422: Introduction of individual cooper marks and official swearing in of Wardens.

1428–1464: Series of petitions for trade regulation, initiation of the "Vellum" book recording Warden names and brethren, and ordinances against inferior wood vessels, including a notable instance in 1464 where poor-quality barrels were burnt in Cheapside.

Tudor Period

1485–1502: John Baker becomes Upper Warden, apprenticeship system established, and Royal Charter granted by Henry VII, stipulating a Master and two Wardens.

1509–1547: Grant of Arms by Henry VIII, first record of a cooper's mark, and various legislative actions enhancing the Company's authority in trade regulation. Notable construction of a school and almshouses by Nicholas Gibson.

Stuart and Commonwealth period

1611–1612: Expansion of almshouse facilities and financial difficulties leading to relinquishment of shares in the Ulster plantation.

1643: Sale of Company's plate to finance the Parliamentary armies.

1653–1658: Administrative changes including meeting schedules and election procedures.

1660–1685: Significant events like the introduction of the Brazil Staff, the rebuilding and completion of the Hall, and the revision of the Company's Charter under Charles II.

Georgian age

1715–1746: Acquisition and bequest of estates, construction of barges, and significant refurbishment of Egham School and Almshouses.

1767–1816: Involvement of Sir James Esdaile as a prominent member and Lord Mayor, installation of gas lighting in the Hall, and various building projects including the rebuilding of Ratcliffe School and Chapel.

Victorian era

1840–1898: Division of the Clerk's office roles, leadership of David Salomons and J.F. Firth in various capacities, establishment and movement of the Girls School, formation of the Stepney & Bow Educational Foundation, and the construction of the third Hall.

20th Century and beyond

1904–2017: Introduction of the silver-gilt chain for the Master, numerous rebuilds and relocations of the Hall and schools, significant damage during WWII, establishment of new charitable foundations, and modernisation including the admission of women to the Livery in 1999, and the election of the first female Master, Clare Hughes, in 2022. In 2024, Liam Randall was elected Under Warden at the age of 31, making him one of the youngest Wardens in the Company’s modern history.

== Hall ==
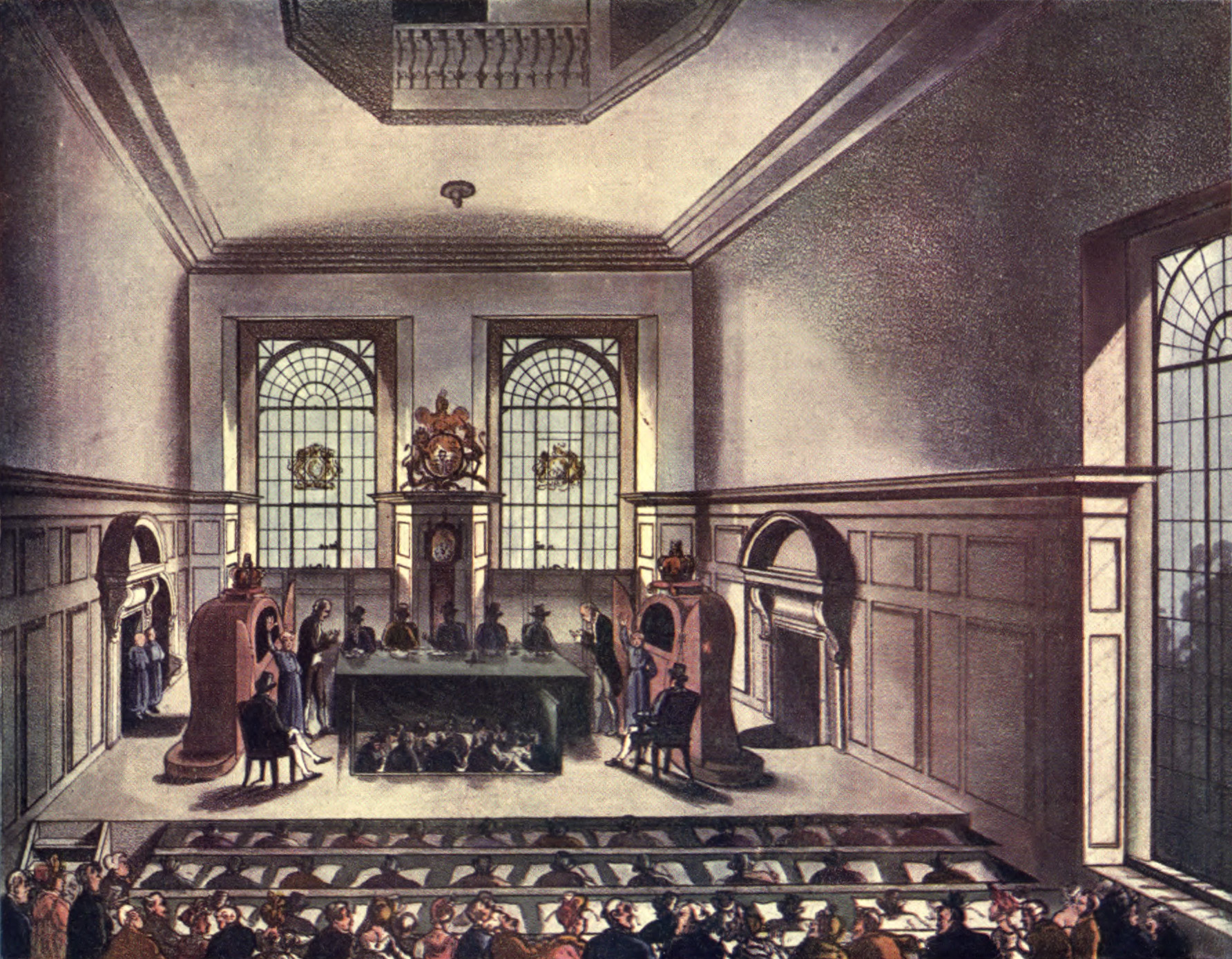
A lottery drawing at Coopers' Hall

Their guild hall was first founded in the Bassishaw City ward in 1522, at The Swan tavern and from 1547 in a purpose-built livery hall. The hall was hired out for feasts by other companies and religious groups, and was used for drawings of government lotteries. This hall was destroyed by the Great Fire of London in 1666 but subsequently rebuilt on the same site.

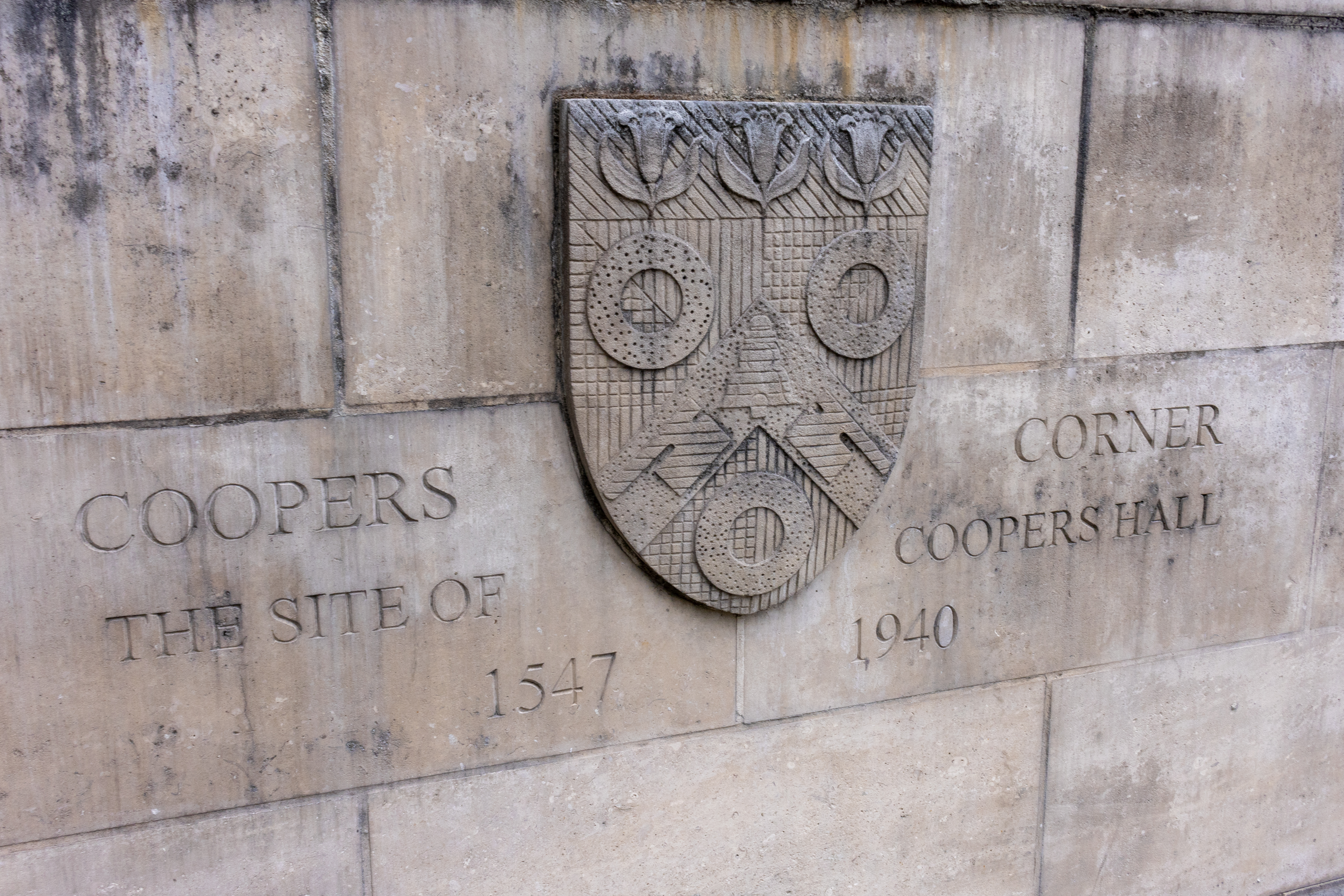
Today the site of the Halls on Basinghall St is marked by a memorial known as Coopers Corner.

The guild rebuilt again in 1865, selling a part of the site to the City of London Corporation for the expansion of Guildhall. This hall was destroyed by fire on the night of 29 December 1940. The livery then shared quarters with other Companies until purchasing their current headquarters in Devonshire Square, off Bishopsgate.

== Grant of Arms ==
Arms of the Coopers' company.

A Grant of Arms was made by Thomas Wrythe or Wriothesley, Garter, September 27, 1509.

Shield

Gyronny of eight Gules and Sable, on a chevron between three annulets Or a royne between two adzes Azure, a chief Vert thereon three lilies slipped stalked and leaved Argent.

Crest

Crest on a wreath Or and Argent, a demi heath cock the body Azure semée with annulets Or with the wings Argent semee of annulets Sable holding in the beak a lily Argent slipped and leaved Vert.

Supporters

On either side a camel Gules semee of annulets bridled Or.

The original Arms, before the reformation, bears the words Gaude Maria Virgo. "Gaude Maria Virgo" marks the beginning of an antiphon for the psalms in the third nocturne of Matins on certain feasts of Our Lady. It is also featured in the hymn performed prior to the Gospel during Masses of Our Lady from Christmas to Easter. The variation "Gaude et laetare Virgo Maria" appears in a renowned Easter Anthem.

== The Society of the Livery ==
=== Early 19th century financial concerns and Livery involvement ===
In the early 19th century, members of the Livery became increasingly concerned with financial mismanagement within their Company. A notable issue was the discovery that the Company was indebted to its Clerk by £1,000, a significant sum at the time, which effectively transferred control over the income from the Company's rents to the Clerk.

This situation rekindled the Livery's interest in their rights and involvement in the Company's affairs. James Firth, a young Liveryman working as an archivist in the Town Clerk's office at Guildhall, led the movement. His access to the Company's Charters through his professional role provided valuable insights, influencing the Livery's approach to addressing these concerns.

=== Resignation of the Clerk and shift in governance ===
The unfolding financial scandal saw to the resignation of the Clerk. Concurrently, nominations were being accepted for the roles of Master and Wardens of the Company. Seizing this opportunity, the Livery nominated its own candidate for the position of Under Warden. Abraham Algar, the Livery's nominee, was elected in 1824, marking a significant shift in the Company's power dynamics. The Livery's ability to outvote the Court, the governing body, was unprecedented and reflected a changing landscape in the governance of such institutions.

=== Establishment of the Society and lasting changes ===
In response to these events, the Society of the Livery of the Worshipful Company of Coopers was established in 1827. Its primary objective was to uphold the rights of the Livery, particularly in electing the Wardens of the Company. The Society also functioned as a constitutional watchdog and evolved into a social club to enhance participation among Liverymen.

The influence of the Livery continued to grow, and by 1883, the convention of the Livery nominating the Under Warden was widely accepted, receiving formal recognition in 1886. This period marked a significant transition in the governance and social dynamics within the Company.

=== Legacy and contemporary role ===
Today, the Society remains active, organising nominations for the Under and Upper Wardens of the Company and running an events programme to foster fellowship. This ongoing role underscores the lasting impact of the events in the early 19th century on the governance and social structure of the Company.

== The Company today ==
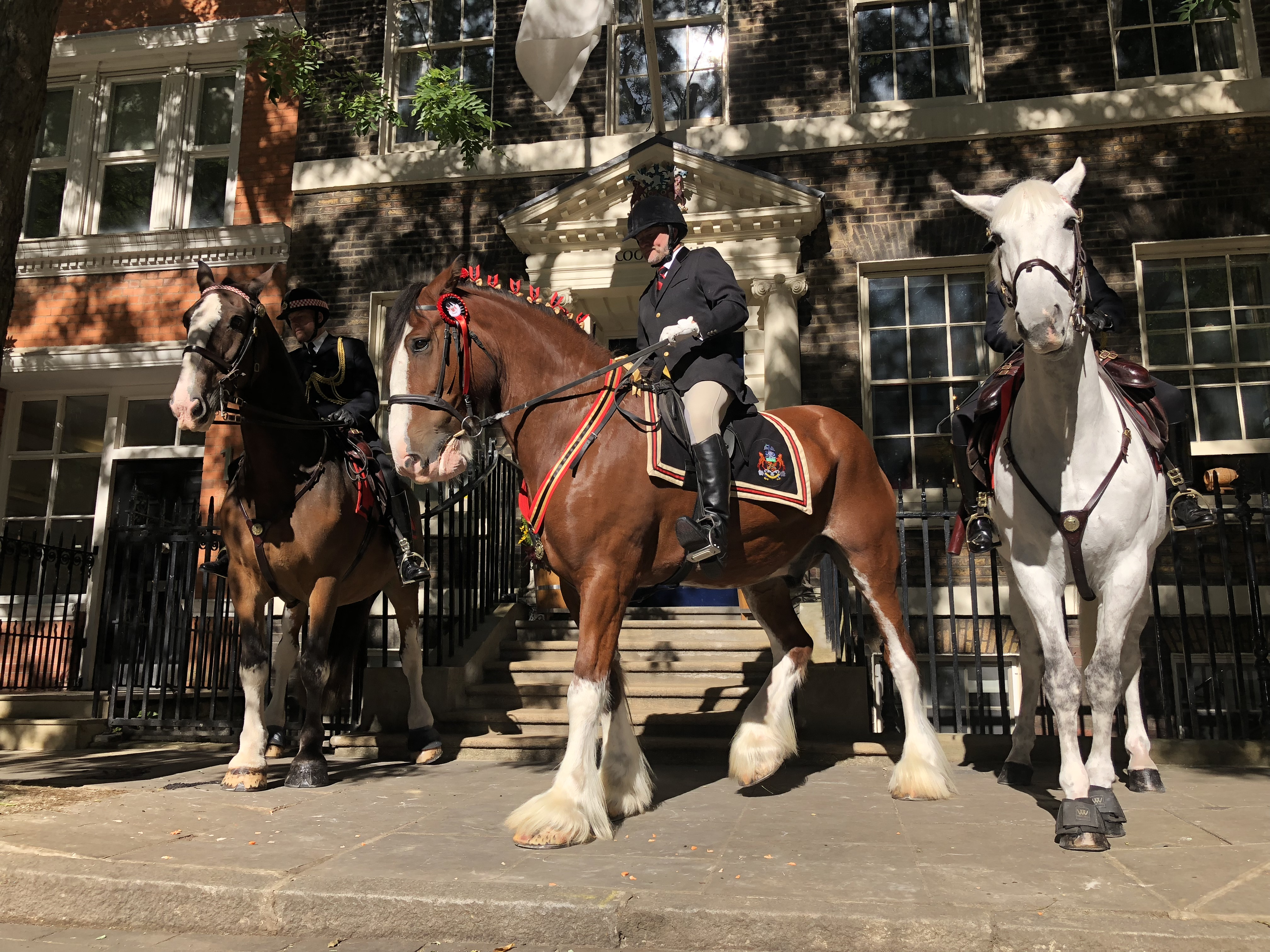
Ajax, the Coopers' mascot and Free-Horse ridden by Liveryman Alan Roberts at Coopers' Hall in Devonshire Square.

In 2015, the idea of a Company mascot for the Coopers' Company was conceived by then Clerk, Adrian Carroll, and Liveryman Alan Roberts. Ajax, a Shire horse owned by Alan, was chosen due to the historical association of heavy horses with the cooperage trade. Ajax was invested as an Honorary Freeman of the Company at Coopers Hall, accompanied by City of London Mounted Police horses. In 2016, he was made an Honorary Liveryman. Ajax participates in various promotional activities for the Company, including visits to RAF Brize Norton, annual services at the Tower of London, and Open Days at Coopers’ Hall. He also carries two English Oak pin casks made by Master Cooper Alistair Simms, decorated with the Company badge. Additionally, Ajax has helped foster the Coopers’ Company's affiliation with the Household Cavalry and performs promotional work at Hook Norton Brewery and plans a visit to Westons Cider Company.

Following the pandemic, the Company has launched a range of new initiatives to raise awareness of the Livery, craft, and its history.

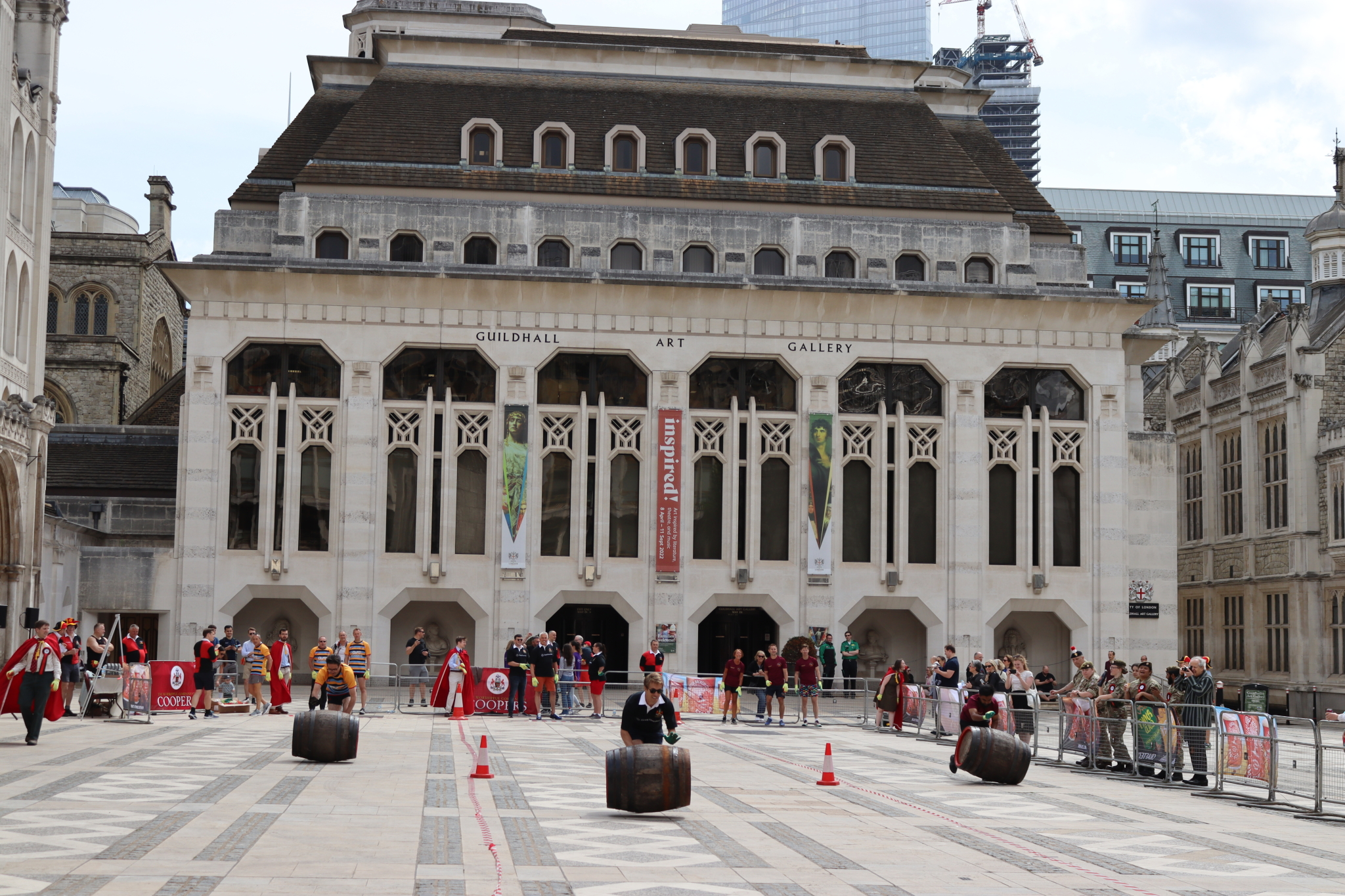
The Coopers' Company Cask Race taking place in 2022 in Guildhall Yard.

In June 2022, the Company inaugurated its Cask Rolling Race at Guildhall Yard, an event that has since become an annual highlight.

In July 2023, the Company established a new annual event, one to honour the feast of St Abdon, the Coopers’ patron saint. This was the first time in the Company’s recorded history where it brewed its own beer, Abdon’s Ale, in collaboration with Hook Norton Brewery.

== List of Coopers as Lord Mayor of London ==
The following Coopers were Lord Mayor of London:

- 1742: Sir Robert Willimot, the first person to hold office from a minor company
- 1777: Sir James Esdaile (mayor)
- 1840: Thomas Johnson
- 1855: Sir David Salomons, the first Jewish Lord Mayor
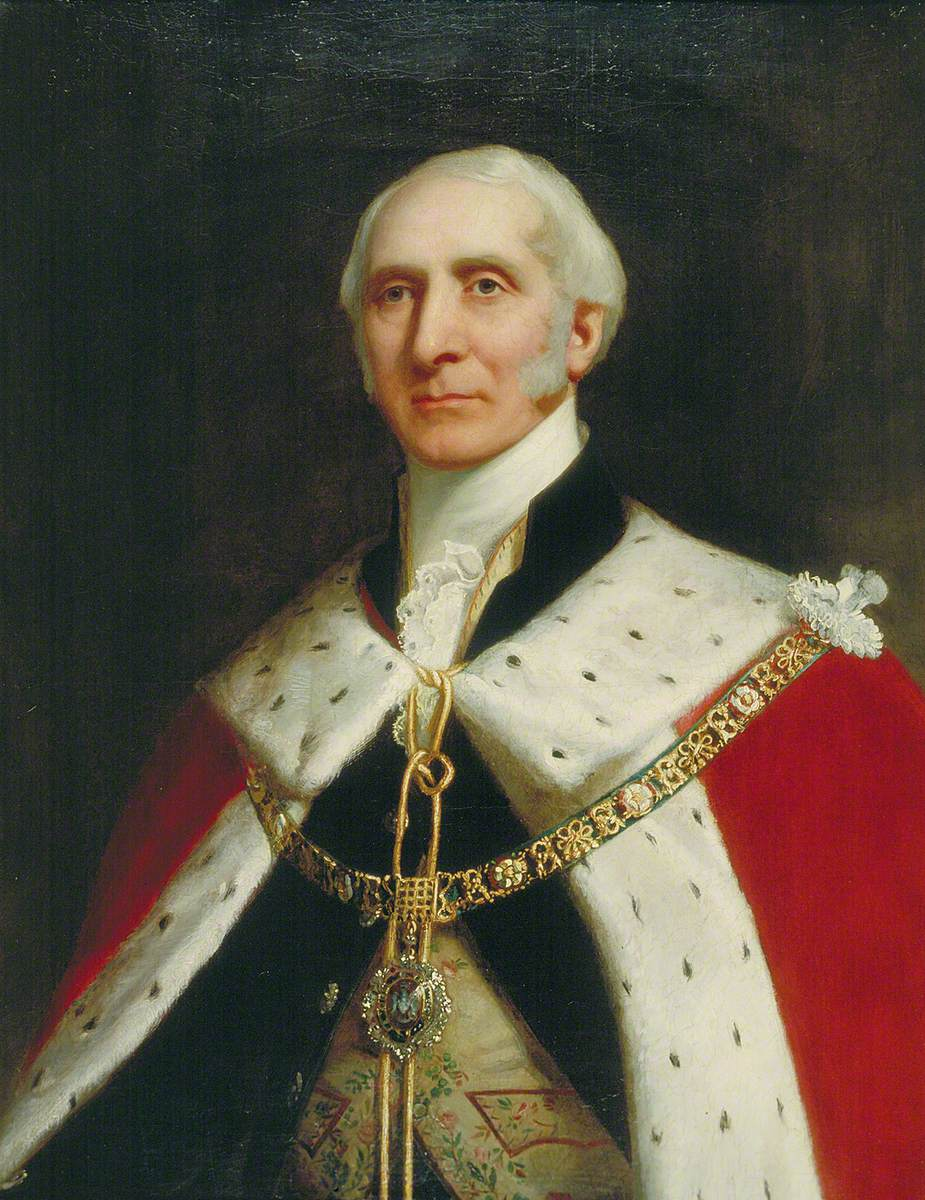
  Sir David Salomons, Cooper and Lord Mayor of London
- 1874: David Henry Stone
- 1974: Sir Murray Fox
- 2008: Ian Luder
