= Bridewell and Bethlehem Hospitals =

Royal charitable hospitals in London

The Bridewell and Bethlehem Hospitals were two charitable foundations that were independently put into the charge of the City of London. They were brought under joint administration in 1557.

== Bethlehem Hospital ==
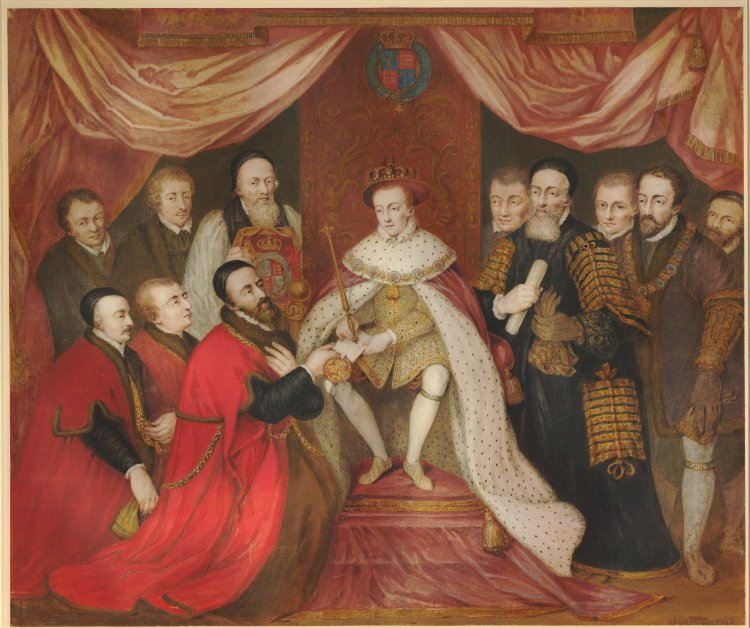
Edward VI grants a charter in 1553 to Bridewell Hospital

The Bethlem Royal Hospital was founded in 1247 as the Priory of the New Order of our Lady of Bethlehem in the city of London during the reign of Henry III. It was established by the Bishop-elect of Bethlehem, the Italian Goffredo de Prefetti, following a donation of personal property by the London alderman and former sheriff, Simon FitzMary. The original location was in the parish of St Botolph, Bishopsgate's ward. In 1546 the Lord Mayor of London, Sir John Gresham, petitioned the crown to grant Bethlem to the city. This petition was partially successful and Henry VIII reluctantly ceded to the City of London "the custody, order and governance" of the hospital and of its "occupants and revenues". This charter came into effect in 1547. The crown retained possession of the hospital while its administration fell to the city authorities. Following a brief interval when it was placed under the management of the governors of Christ's Hospital, from 1557 Bethlem was administered by the governors of Bridewell.

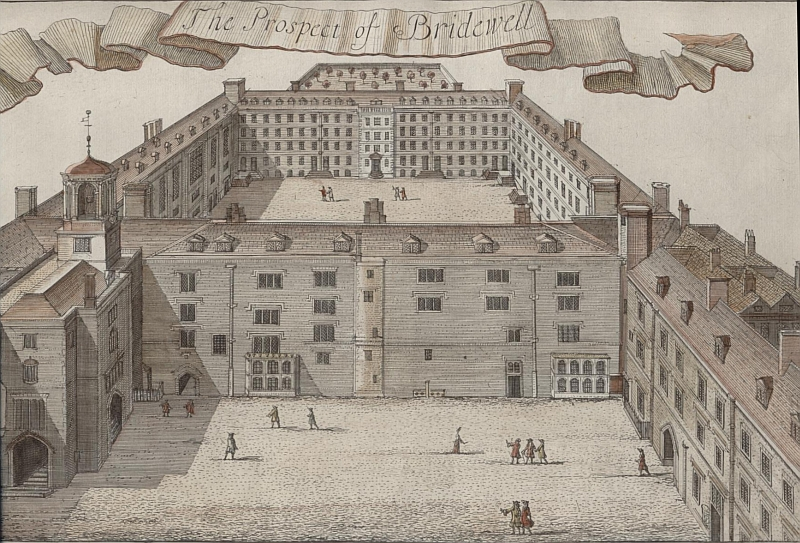
"The Prospect of Bridewell" from John Strype's, An Accurate Edition of Stow's "A Survey of London"

== Bridewell Hospital ==
In 1553, Edward VI gave Bridewell Palace to the City of London for the housing of homeless children and for the punishment of "disorderly women".

The City took full possession in 1556 and turned the site into a prison, hospital and workrooms.

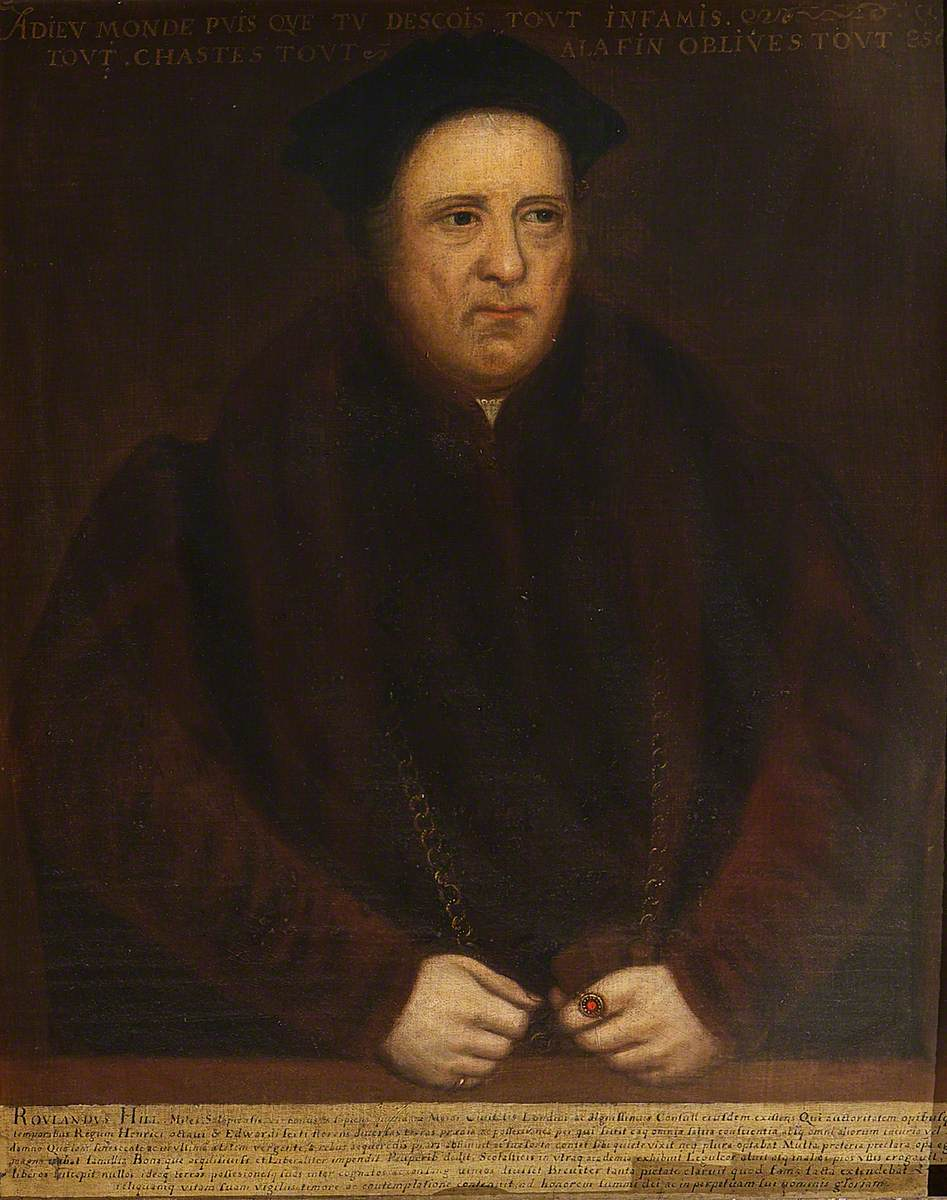
Sir Rowland Hill was the first president of the hospitals. Hill also coordinated the Geneva Bible translation, and was Lord Mayor of London in 1549

== Joint administration ==
In 1557 the administration of Bethlem Royal Hospital became the responsibility of the Bridewell Governors. The post of President was established, with first occupant being Sir Rowland Hill in 1557.

== List of presidents of the Bridewell and Bethlehem Hospitals ==
- Sir Rowland Hill 1557–1558
- Sir William Garrett 1558
- Sir Rowland Hill 1559
- Sir Roland Haywood 1561
- Edward Gilbart 1563
- Sir William Chester 1564
- Sir John White 1568
- Sir Lionel Duckett 1568–73
- Sir Alexander Avenon 1573
- Sir Lionel Duckett 1580–86
- Sir William Rowe 1592
- Sir William Webbe 1594
- Sir Stephen Slaney 1599
- Sir William Ryder 1600
- Sir Leonard Halliday 1605
- Sir Thomas Middleton 1613
- Sir Roland Hayter 1631
- George Whitman 1631
- Sir John Wollaston 1643
- Christopher Packe 1649
- Sir Richard Brown Bt 1661
- Sir James Smith 1668
- Sir William Turner 1669
- Sir Robert Geffrye 1689
- Sir William Turner 1690
- Sir Robert Geffrye 1693-
- Sir Samuel Dashwood 1703
- Sir Thomas Rawlinson1705
- Sir William Withers 1708
- Sir Samuel Garrard 1721
- Sir William Humfreys, 1st Baronet (died 1735)
- Humphrey Parsons 1725–1741
- Robert Willimot 1741
- William Benn1746
- Sir Richard Glyn 1755
- Sir Walter Rawlinson 1773
- Brackley Kennett 1777
- Brass Crosby 1782
- Sir James Sanderson 1789
- Sir Richard Carr Glyn 1793
- Sir Peter Laurie 1833
- William Taylor Copeland 1861
- J E Johnson 1868
- Sir James Lawrence, 1st Baronet 1868
