= Francis Haskins Eyles-Stiles =

British landowner

Arms of Eyles: Argent, a fess engrailed sable in chief three fleurs-de-lys of the last

Sir Francis Haskins Eyles-Stiles, 3rd Baronet (died 26 January 1762), formerly Eyles, was a British landowner.

== Origins ==
He was the only son and heir of Sir John Eyles, 2nd Baronet, by his wife Mary Haskins Stiles. Under the will of his maternal uncle, Benjamin Haskins Styles, of Moor Park, Rickmansworth, Hertfordshire, who died unmarried on 4 April 1739, he assumed the additional name of Stiles after that of Eyles.

== Life ==
He was elected a Fellow of the Royal Society in 1742, and succeeded to the family baronetcy on 11 March 1745. A few months later, in October 1745, he sold the Gidea Hall estate he had inherited. He was a Commissioner for Victualling, 26 January 1762.

== Marriage and issue ==
He married, probably about 1735, Sibella Egerton (baptised 1 December 1711 at Astbury, Cheshire), daughter of the Rev. Philip Egerton, D.D., Rector of Astbury, by Frances, daughter of John Offley.

His son, Sir John Haskins Eyles-Stiles, 4th Baronet, was born 16 April 1741, and died unmarried on 1 November 1768 aged 27. He was buried 4 days later at St Helen's Bishopsgate. The baronetcy became extinct. His only surviving sister, Mary, born on 16 January 1745, married her cousin Philip Egerton of Oulton, Cheshire, in or before 1766. Her husband died in 1786, aged 54, and she died in December 1821. She was the mother of Sir John Grey Egerton, 8th Baronet.

== Death ==
Eyles-Stiles died at Naples on 26 January 1762, and was succeeded by his son John Haskins Eyles-Stiles. His wife died shortly afterward, before 23 April 1763, when the probate of her estate was granted to her son.

Baronetage of Great Britain
Preceded by John Eyles	Baronet (of London); 1745–1762	Succeeded by John Haskins Eyles-Stiles
