= Peter Godfrey (MP) =

British merchant and politician

Peter Godfrey (1665–1724) was a British merchant and politician who sat in the House of Commons from 1715 to 1724.

Godfrey was the second son of Michael Godfrey, merchant of London, and his wife Anna Maria Chamberlain, daughter of Sir Thomas Chamberlain of Woodford, Essex. He was the nephew of Sir Edmund Berry Godfrey, the magistrate who was murdered in 1678 after receiving Titus Oates's depositions concerning the Popish Plot. Peter's elder brother Michael Godfrey was one of the founders of, and the first Deputy Governor of, the Bank of England. Godfrey married by licence dated 29 October 1692, Catherine Goddard, daughter of Thomas Goddard, merchant, of Nun's Court, Coleman Street, London. She died in 1706, and he married as his second wife Catherine Pennyman, daughter of Sir Thomas Pennyman, 2nd Baronet, of Ormesby, Yorkshire.

Godfrey succeeded his brother Michael in July 1695 when the latter was killed by a stray cannon shot while surveying the scene at the Siege of Namur. He was a Director of the Bank of England from 1695 to 1698, and a Director of the New East India Company from 1698 to 1699. He was a Director of the East India Company from 1710 to 1714 and from 1715 to 1718.

At the 1713 general election Godfrey was defeated in the City of London constituency on the platform of an anti-French commercial treaty. He was returned for that constituency at the 1715 general election, and was classed as a Whig in one list of the Parliament and as a Tory in another. He voted against the Government in all recorded divisions. In November 1721, he presented a petition from the owners of redeemable stock asking that the two million pounds owed to the Government by the South Sea Company should be used to compensate them for their losses, but it was unsuccessful. In January 1722, he supported a motion for the repeal of the clauses of the Quarantine Act that gave emergency powers to the Government. He was re-elected for the City of London at the 1722 general election.

Godfrey died on 10 November 1724. He had six sons and a daughter by his first wife.

Parliament of Great Britain
Preceded by Sir William Withers; Sir Richard Hoare; Sir George Newland; Sir John Cass	Member of Parliament for the City of London; 1715–1724; With: Robert Heysham 1715-1722; Thomas Scawen 1715-1722; Sir John Ward 1715-1722; Richard Lockwood 1722-1724; Sir John Barnard 1722-1724; Francis Child 1722-1724	Succeeded by Richard Hopkins; Richard Lockwood; Sir John Barnard; Francis Child
