= Thomas Scawen =

British merchant, financier and Whig politician

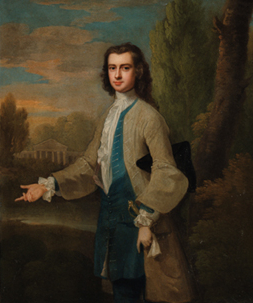
Portrait of Thomas Scawen, three-quarter-length, in a cream coat and blue waistcoat, in a landscape with a classical building beyond

Sir Thomas Scawen (c. 1650 – 22 September 1730) was a British merchant, financier and Whig politician who sat in the House of Commons between 1708 and 1722. He was Governor of the Bank of England from 1721 to 1723.

== Early life ==
Scawen was a younger son of Robert Scawen of Horton, Buckinghamshire and his wife Catherine Alsop, daughter of Cavendish Alsop, merchant of London. He married Martha Wessell, the daughter of Abraham Wessell, a London merchant, on 8 September 1691.

== Career ==
Like his brother William, Scawen was a successful London merchant. He was an Apprentice of the Fishmongers’ Company in 1671, a freeman in 1679, and a liveryman in 1685. In 1699 he was a member of the Russia Company. He was an assistant at the Fishmonger's Company in 1704 and was a director of the Bank of England from 1705 to 1719. At the 1708 British general election he was returned unopposed as Whig Member of Parliament for Grampound. He was also Prime Warden of the Fishmongers’ Company from 1708 to 1710. In Parliament, he supported the naturalization of the Palatines in 1709, and voted for the impeachment of Dr Sacheverell in 1710. He did not stand at the 1710 British general election. On 29 January 1712, he was elected an alderman for Cornhill, London. He was knighted on 25 September 1714.

At the 1715 British general election, Scawen was elected MP for City of London. From 1719, he was a Director of the Bank of England until 1721 when he became Governor of the Bank of England. In 1722 he inherited the manor of Horton from his brother William. The remainder of William's estates passed to Thomas's eldest son, also Thomas. From 1723 to his death, Scawen was a Deputy Governor.

== Death and legacy ==
Scawen died on 22 September 1730 at Carshalton and was buried at Horton, Buckinghamshire. He and his wife had five sons and four daughters. He left Horton to his eldest son, Thomas, who married a daughter of Hon. James Russell, and was the father of James Scawen, MP for Surrey. The remainder of his properties went to his younger sons. His daughter Catherine married Sir John Shelley, 4th Baronet and other daughters married John Trenchard and Sir Nathaniel Mead.

Parliament of Great Britain
Preceded by James Craggs; Francis Scobell	Member of Parliament for Grampound; 1708–1710; With: James Craggs	Succeeded by James Craggs; Thomas Coke
Preceded by Sir William Withers; Sir Richard Hoare; Sir George Newland; Sir John Cass	Member of Parliament for the City of London; 1715–1722; With: Robert Heysham; Peter Godfrey; Sir John Ward	Succeeded by Peter Godfrey; Richard Lockwood; Sir John Barnard; Francis Child
Government offices
Preceded by Sir John Hanger	Governor of the Bank of England; 1721–1723	Succeeded by Sir Gilbert Heathcote
