= Robert Child (Devizes MP) =

English politician and Chairman of the East India Company

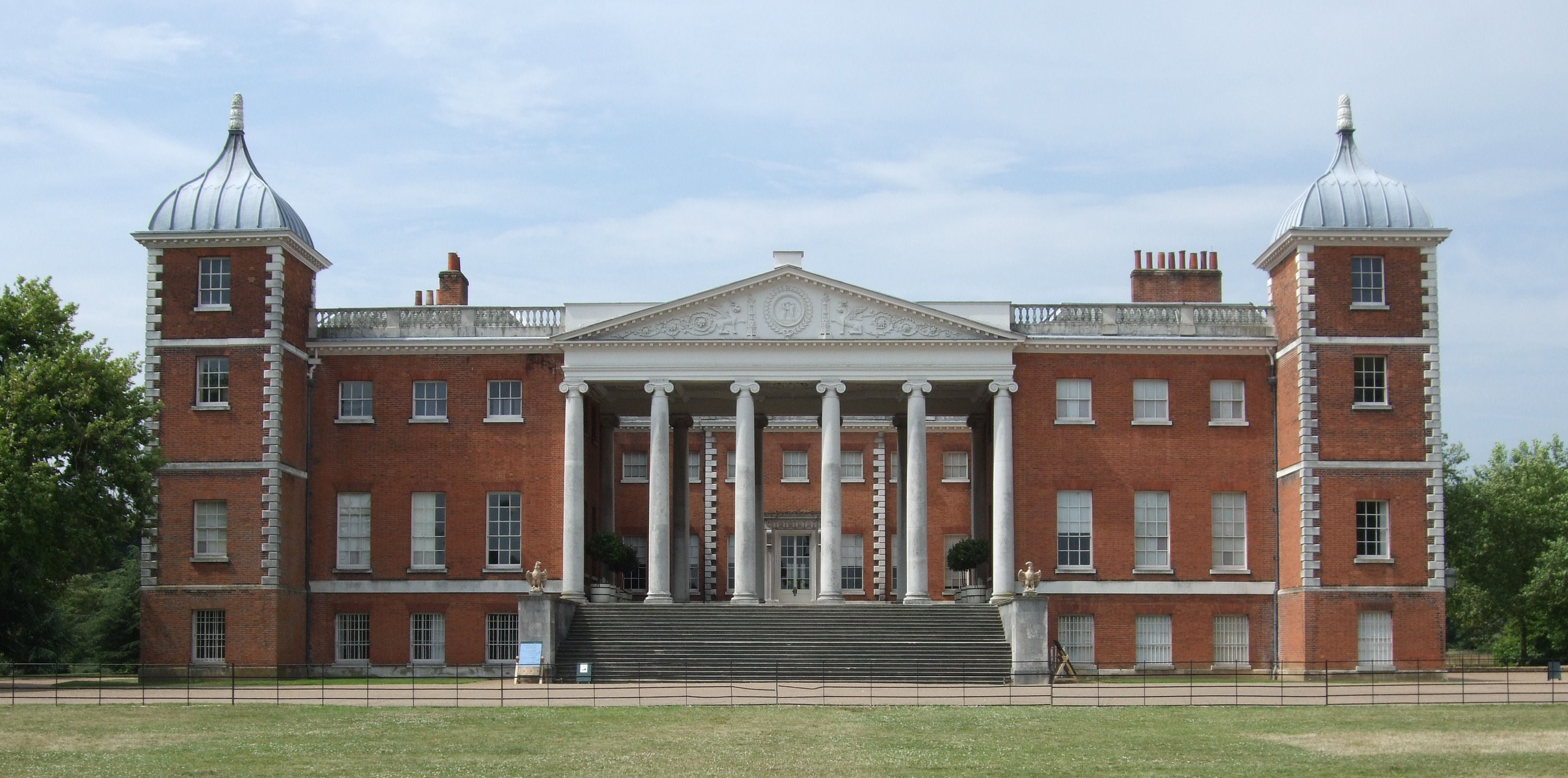
Osterley Park House, built after Child's death

Sir Robert Child (bap. 6 June 1674 – 6 October 1721) was an English banker and politician. The heir to his father's banking business, the London-based Child & Co., he was Chairman of the East India Company in 1715. He also served as a member of parliament (MP) for Helston from 1710 to 1713, and for Devizes from 1713 to 1715.

== Personal background ==
Robert Child was eldest surviving son of Sir Francis Child, MP, Lord Mayor of London in 1698 and Jeweller to King William III.

His father took Osterley Park, after a default on its mortgage, which Child subsequently inherited. It then became Child's principal seat.

== Member of Parliament ==
Child was Member of Parliament for Helston between 1710 and 1713. He then stood for his father's old constituency of Devizes, where he was Member of Parliament between 1713 and 1715. He was knighted in 1714.

He was an alderman in London from 1713 to his death. On his death (unmarried) the estate passed to his brother Francis. It is Child's nephews, also named Francis and Robert, who are accredited with commissioning the building of Osterley House by Adam.

Parliament of Great Britain
Preceded by Sidney Godolphin; George Granville	Member of Parliament for Helston; 1710–1713; With: Sidney Godolphin	Succeeded by Henry Campion; Charles Coxe
Preceded by Sir Francis Child; Thomas Richmond Webb	Member of Parliament for Devizes; 1713–1715; With: John Nicholas	Succeeded by Josiah Diston; Francis Eyles
