= Francis Child (died 1740) =

Lord Mayor of London

Sir Francis Child the younger (c. 1684 – 1740), of the Marygold, by Temple Bar, and Osterley Park, Middlesex, was a British banker and politician who sat in the House of Commons from 1722 to 1740. He was Lord Mayor of London in 1731.

== Early life ==
Child was the son of Sir Francis Child. He was probably born in 1684, as the record of his admission to the freedom of the city of London is dated 12 March 1705. On the death of his elder brother, Sir Robert Child, in 1721, Child became the head of the banking firm, which was then carried on under the style of Francis Child & Co. He was also elected on 10 October of the same year to succeed his brother and father as aldermen of the ward of Farringdon Without, and the following year he became Sheriff of London, with Alderman Humphrey Parsons as his colleague.

== Career ==
In 1722, Child served the office of master of the Goldsmiths' Company and was elected Member of Parliament for the City of London at the 1722 general election. At the 1727 general election, he was elected one of the MPs for Middlesex and was also returned at the succeeding election in 1734.

Child purchased in 1726 an estate at Northall for £19,501, which now forms part of the Osterley estate.

From 1727 to 1740, he was president of Christ's Hospital, and his portrait is preserved in the boardroom of that institution; another portrait, painted in his robes as lord mayor, is to be found at Osterley Park. In 1729, Child introduced a new form of promissory note with a picture of Temple Bar in the left-hand corner. These were worded very similarly to the Bank of England notes of the present day and were discontinued, as Mr. F. G. H. Price considers, before 1800.

Child became Lord Mayor in 1731 and appointed as his chaplain Dr. John Middleton, rector of St. Peter's, Cornhill. Towards the close of his mayoralty, on 28 September of the following year, he attended with the court of aldermen, sheriffs, and other officials to congratulate George II on his safe return from Hanover. On this occasion, the king conferred the honour of knighthood upon the lord mayor, Alderman John Barnard, and Alderman Henry Hankey, one of the sheriffs.

Child was elected a director of the East India Company in the year of his mayoralty and was re-elected in 1732.

== Death and legacy ==
Child died on 20 April 1740, and was buried at Fulham on 28 April.

== Notes ==
Parliament of Great Britain
Preceded by John Ward; Sir Thomas Scawen; Robert Heysham; Peter Godfrey	Member of Parliament for the City of London; 1722–1727; With: Peter Godfrey 1722–1724; Sir John Barnard1722–1727; Richard Lockwood 1722–1727; Richard Hopkins 1724–1727	Succeeded by Sir John Eyles; Micajah Perry; Humphry Parsons; Sir John Barnard
Preceded by Hon. James Bertie; Sir John Austen, Bt.	Member of Parliament for Middlesex; 1727–1740; With: Hon. James Bertie 1727-1734; William Pulteney 1734-1740	Succeeded by William Pulteney; Sir Hugh Smithson, Bt
Civic offices
Preceded by Humphrey Parsons	Lord Mayor of London; 1731–1732	Succeeded by John Barber
