= Richard Hopkins (died 1736) =

British merchant and politician

Sir Richard Hopkins (died 1736) of St. Botolph's, Bishopsgate, London was a British merchant and politician who sat in the House of Commons from 1724 to 1727.

Hopkins was born after 1676, the son of Richard Hopkins of St. Botolph's and his wife Rose Sherard, daughter of George Sherard of Bushby, Leicestershire. He became a merchant trading with Turkey and member of the Cutler's Company. He married Ann Lethieullier, daughter of William Lethieullier, merchant of London.

Hopkins was Director of the Royal Exchange Assurance Corporation in 1720 and became a Director of the South Sea Company in 1721 for the rest of his life. He was knighted on 26 July 1722. In 1723, he stood as a Whig in a hard-fought contest for Sheriff of London and served for the year 1723 to 1724. He was elected Alderman for Lime Street Ward on 4 March 1724. Also in 1724, he was elected Member of Parliament for the City of London at a by-election on 11 December 1724. He lost the seat in the contest at the 1727 general election. He translated to the Fishmongers Company on 26 May 1730 and was prime warden of the Fishmongers’ Company from. 1730 to 1732. He became Sub Governor of the South Sea Company in 1733.

Hopkins died on 2 January 1736 and was said to be worth £100,000.

Parliament of Great Britain
Preceded by Peter Godfrey; Francis Child; Richard Lockwood; Sir John Barnard	Member of Parliament for the City of London; 1724–1727; With: Sir John Barnard; Francis Child; Richard Lockwood	Succeeded by Sir John Eyles; Micajah Perry; Humphry Parsons; Sir John Barnard
