= Francis Eyles (died 1750) =

British Army officer and politician (c. 1704–1750)

Francis Eyles (c. 1704–1750), of Soho Square, London, and Earnshill, near Taunton, Somerset, was a British Army officer and Whig politician who sat in the House of Commons from 1727 to 1742.

Eyles was the eldest son of John Eyles of Southbroom, Wiltshire and his wife Mary Eyles, daughter of John Eyles of Chalford, Gloucestershire. He joined the army and was a cornet in the 4th Dragoons in 1723 and a lieutenant in 1726 and became a captain by 1731.

At the 1727 British general election Eyles was returned unopposed as Member of Parliament for Devizes on the Eyles family interest. He became a member of the gaols committee of the House of Commons and voted with the Government. In 1732 he became one of the founding Trustees for the Establishment of the Colony of Georgia in America. He was described as one of Walpole's ‘creatures’ and in 1734, he obtained a place as commissioner for victualling the navy worth £500 a year. He was returned unopposed again for Devizes at the 1734 British general election when he also stood at Calne. In 1735, he succeeded to the estates of his uncle Francis Eyles who had been expelled from Parliament in the South Sea Bubble scandal. He was returned unopposed again for Devizes at the 1741 British general election. After the fall of Walpole in 1742, he gave up his seat and exchanged his place for a sinecure appointment as superintendent of the King's foundries.

Eyles died on 21 September 1750.

Parliament of Great Britain
Preceded by Sir Joseph Eyles; Benjamin Haskins-Stiles	Member of Parliament for Devizes; 1727–1742; With: Benjamin Haskins-Stiles 1727-1734; Sir Joseph Eyles 1734-1740; John Garth 1740-1742	Succeeded by George Lee; John Garth
