= University of Manitoba College of Medicine =

Max Rady College of Medicine
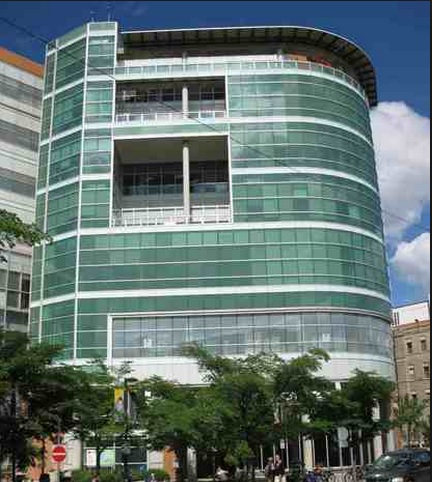
- UofM Medical School's administrative building
- Former names: School of Medicine; Manitoba Medical College
- Type: Medical college
- Established: 1883; 143 years ago
- Parent institution: University of Manitoba Rady Faculty of Health Sciences
- Dean: Peter Nickerson
- Academic staff: 1,630
- Students: 1,255 (2020); 140 per year
- Location: 750 Bannatyne Ave, Winnipeg, Manitoba; 49.9038°N 97.1610°W
- Campus: urban
- Website: umanitoba.ca/healthsciences/medicine
- Building details

General information
- Architectural style: Neoclassical (Classical revival)
- Completed: 1905
- Opened: 1906

Design and construction
- Architect: James H. Cadham
- Main contractor: Ritchie & Burnett

Renovating team
- Architect: John H. G. Russell (1909, 1913)

The Max Rady College of Medicine is a medical college of the University of Manitoba in Winnipeg and is one of several departments of the university's Rady Faculty of Health Sciences.

Opening in 1883 as the Manitoba Medical College, it is the first medical school of the Prairie provinces. The college has 27 academic departments, institutes, and administrative units found throughout the university's Bannatyne campus, the Health Sciences Centre, and other Winnipeg health sciences facilities. The college also consists of several centres, institutes, and research groups, often in partnership with other health sciences organizations.

In 2024, there were 1173 applicants for 140 MD spots. The admitted students had an average adjusted GPA of 4.26 (out of 4.5), and an average MCAT of 513. The nearby University of Winnipeg also offers a pre-medical studies program.

== History ==
The Manitoba Medical College was privately founded in the early years of Winnipeg, at a time when hospitals were only beginning to appear and the need for a medical school in the Prairies was becoming evident.

=== Founding and early years ===
In 1883, thirteen prospective doctors petitioned the Manitoba Legislature to charter the Manitoba Medical College as a private medical college. Two founding principles were established: first, degrees would be granted by the University of Manitoba rather than by the college; and second, the college would be led by established practitioners, maintaining direct involvement from physicians in the Winnipeg community.

On 13 November 1883, the School Board approved the use of the Central Collegiate Institute (26 Isabel Street) for the new College. Two days later, James Kerr, the first Dean of Medicine, delivered the inaugural address:

This fact, I think, is somewhat characteristic of the country in which we live and its extraordinary progressive tendencies, for I believe it to be the first time in the history of medicine that the student requested that he should be supplied with teachers, instead of teachers soliciting the students to be taught.

A week later, the first lecture was given by Dr. R. J. Blanchard. Classes were initially held in temporary space before the college moved to 561 McDermot Avenue, at the corner of Kate Street. The building was later sold and converted into the St. Regis Apartments.

In 1892, the college saw its first female graduate, Hattie Foxton, who achieved first-class standing in both Doctor of Medicine and Master of Surgery.

The college expanded its original building in 1884. In 1897, the Bacteriological Research Building was designed by architect Charles Henry Wheeler.

=== Expansion and affiliation with the University ===
The University of Manitoba Act of 1900 allowed the university to teach medical students directly and appoint full-time professors. Four such appointments were made in 1904—bacteriologist, physiologist, botanist and physicist—and an obstetrics department was added in 1905.

Growing enrolment soon required more space. In 1906, the college moved to a building at 750 Bannatyne Avenue, at the corner of Emily Street. The building was constructed in 1905 by S.B. Ritchie & P. Burnett and designed by architect James H. Cadham. A second building at 770 Bannatyne Avenue was erected in 1921.

In 1919, the Manitoba Medical College was absorbed by the University of Manitoba and became its Faculty of Medicine.

=== Quota system ===
In 1932, the college adopted an official quota system to limit the number of Jewish students admitted to the medical program. The antisemitic policy was instituted by Dean Dr. Alvin Trotter Mathers and remained in place until it was abolished in 1945–46.

=== Campus growth ===
A new building opened on McDermot Avenue in 1956 to house the library, microbiology and cafeteria wing. It now serves as the home of the College of Rehabilitation Sciences. Other facilities followed, including:

- the Chown Building (753 McDermot Ave.) in 1965,
- the Basic Medical Services Building (730 William Ave.) in 1974, and
- the Brodie Centre (727 McDermot Ave.), dedicated in 1996.

The Faculty of Medicine's Arms were registered with the Canadian Heraldic Authority on 15 August 2008.

=== Memorials ===
The Manitoba Medical Alumni Association erected the Medical Corps Memorial to honour graduates and students who died in military service during the 1885 North West Rebellion (1 name), the 1900 South African War (1 name), and the First World War (7 names). The memorial bears the inscription: "In enduring remembrance of the Graduates and students of this school who laid down their lives in Wars of the Empire, their names are here inscribed by the Manitoba Medical Alumni Association.... To you from falling hands we throw the torch. Be yours to hold high."

=== Recent developments ===
In 2014, the university brought together its health-sciences community to form the Faculty of Health Sciences, incorporating the Faculties of Medicine, Dentistry, Nursing, Pharmacy and the Schools of Dental Hygiene and Medical Rehabilitation. The former Faculty of Medicine became known as the College of Medicine within this structure.

In 2016, the college was renamed the Max Rady College of Medicine in honour of Max and Rose Rady, following a $30-million gift from the Rady Family Foundation—the largest philanthropic donation in the university's history.

== Departments ==
The Max Rady College of Medicine includes 22 academic departments located across the University of Manitoba's Bannatyne Campus, the Health Sciences Centre (HSC), and other affiliated health-sciences facilities in Winnipeg. Each department contributes to teaching, research, clinical service and community health, supported by more than 1,600 faculty members.

The Department of Community Health Sciences was established in 1987 through the merger of the Department of Social and Preventive Medicine and the Division of Community and Northern Medicine.

Departments include:

- Anesthesiology, Perioperative and Pain Medicine (Harry Medovy House, HSC)
- Biochemistry and Medical Genetics (Basic Medical Sciences Building, Bannatyne Campus)
- Clinical Health Psychology (PsycHealth Centre, HSC)
- Community Health Sciences (Pathology Building, Bannatyne Campus)
- Continuing Competency and Assessment (Brodie Centre, Bannatyne Campus)
- Family medicine (Pathology Building, Bannatyne Campus)
- Emergency medicine (Medical Services Building, Bannatyne Campus)
- Human Anatomy & Cell Science (Basic Medical Sciences Building, Bannatyne Campus)
- Immunology (Apotex Centre, Bannatyne Campus)
- Internal medicine (Health Sciences Centre, Bannatyne Campus)
- Medical Education (Medical Services Building, Bannatyne Campus)
- Medical Microbiology and Infectious Diseases (Basic Medical Sciences Building, Bannatyne Campus)
- Obstetrics, Gynecology & Reproductive Sciences (Women's Hospital and affiliated clinical sites, HSC)
- Ophthalmology (Misericordia Health Centre)
- Otolaryngology – Head & Neck Surgery (Health Sciences Centre)
- Pathology (Pathology Building, Bannatyne Campus)
- Pediatrics and Child Health (HSC Winnipeg Children's Hospital)
- Pharmacology & Therapeutics (Chown Building, Bannatyne Campus)
- Physiology and Pathophysiology (Basic Medical Sciences Building, Bannatyne Campus)
- Psychiatry (PsycHealth Centre, HSC)
- Radiology (Health Sciences Centre)
- Surgery (Health Sciences Centre)

== Notable alumni and faculty ==
- John C. Boileau Grant – Professor of Anatomy (1919–1930) – Author of Grant's Atlas of Anatomy and Grant's Dissector
- William Boyd – Professor of Pathology (1919–1937) – Author of Surgical Pathology, Pathology of Internal Disease, Textbook of Pathology and Introduction to Medical Science
