= Sir Francis Eyles, 1st Baronet =

English merchant

Arms of Eyles: Argent, a fess engrailed sable in chief three fleurs-de-lys of the last

Sir Francis Eyles, 1st Baronet (died 24 May 1716) was an English merchant who was Governor of the Bank of England and a baronet in the Baronetage of Great Britain.

== Biography ==
He was the son of John Eyles, a Wiltshire wool-stapler, and the younger brother of Sir John Eyles, with whom he went into business as "Eyles & Co". He was an eminent haberdasher and merchant in London, and was Sheriff of the City, 1710–11, and Alderman of Bridge Without from 23 January 1711 until his death.

He was a director of the East India Company and from 1697 a director of the Bank of England. He was elected Governor of the Bank of England from 1707 to 1709, having earlier served as its Deputy Governor. He was created a baronet on 1 December 1714, one of the first created by George I.

He married Elizabeth Ayley, daughter of London merchant Richard Ayley, in or before 1673. Their two surviving sons were John, who became a Member of Parliament and succeeded to the baronetcy, and Joseph, who also became an MP. Their three other sons and a daughter died before them.

He died on 24 May 1716, and was buried on 5 June 1716 at St Helen's Bishopsgate.

Government offices
Preceded by Sir James Bateman	Governor of the Bank of England; 1707 – 1709	Succeeded by Sir Gilbert Heathcote
Baronetage of Great Britain
New title	Baronet (of London); 1714–1716	Succeeded by John Eyles
