= John D. Eyles =

British-Canadian geographer (born 1946)

- Born: 1946 (age 79–80)

Academic background
- Education: BA, MSc, London School of Economics; PhD, University of London
- Thesis: Sense of place: an investigation of the relationships between theory, observation and explanation (1983)

Academic work
- Institutions: McMaster University
- Doctoral students: Michelle Driedger

John David Eyles (born 1946) is a British-Canadian geographer. In 2001, he was elected fellow of the Royal Society of Canada. Eyles is currently within the School of Geography and Earth Sciences at McMaster University, but holds appointments in Clinical Epidemiology and Biostatistics, Sociology, and the Centre for Health Economics and Policy analysis.

== Education ==
Eyles completed his Bachelor of Arts and Master of Science at the London School of Economics and his PhD at the University of London. He completed his dissertation, "Sense of place: an investigation of the relationships between theory, observation and explanation," in 1983. Following his PhD, Eyles joined the faculty at McMaster University in Hamilton, Ontario in 1988.
