= John Norris (1685–1752) =

English politician (1685–1752)

Member of the British Parliament for Chippenham
- In office 1713–1715
- Preceded by: Sir James Long, 5th Baronet
- Succeeded by: Giles Earle (MP)

John Norris (1685–1752) was an English member of the Parliament of Great Britain.

He was born the eldest son of William Norris of Nonsuch House, Wiltshire and Lincoln's Inn, London and educated at Trinity College, Oxford, where he matriculated in 1700. He entered Lincoln's Inn in 1703 to study law and was called to the bar in 1710.

He represented Chippenham in Parliament from 1713 to 1715.

He died in 1752, having married, in 1716, Elizabeth, probably the daughter of John Thresher of Bradford-on-Avon, Wiltshire and had at least one son, William.
