= Moor Park (house) =

Mansion in Hertfordshire, England

Coordinates: 51.6283°N 0.4480°W

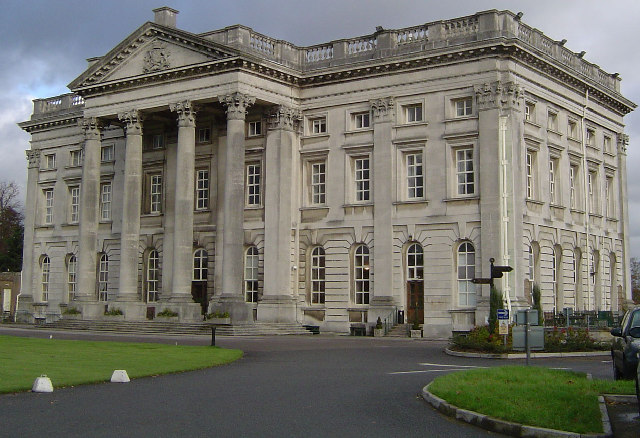
Moor Park

Moor Park is a Neo-Palladian mansion set within several hundred acres of parkland to the south-east of Rickmansworth in Hertfordshire, England. It is called Moor Park Mansion because it is in the old park of the Manor of the More, a 16th-century palace. It now serves as the clubhouse of Moor Park Golf Club.

The house is listed Grade I on the National Heritage List for England, and the landscaped park is listed Grade II* on the Register of Historic Parks and Gardens.

The Manor of the More had become a ruin by the early 17th century, and Edward Russell, 3rd Earl of Bedford built the original version of this house as a replacement c. 1617. The house was rebuilt by its new owner James Scott, 1st Duke of Monmouth in the late 1670s, and was inherited by his widow Anne Scott, 1st Duchess of Buccleuch at the time of his death. She sold the house to the businessman Benjamin Haskins-Stiles, who financed a remodeling of the house and the addition of a portico during the 1720s.

== History ==
After the Manor of the More became a ruin, in about 1617 the 3rd Earl of Bedford built a new house on the hill to the southwest of the old palace, within the deer park.

The house was rebuilt in 1678–1679 for James Scott, 1st Duke of Monmouth, and inherited by his wife, Anne Scott, 1st Duchess of Buccleuch, after he was beheaded. She sold it to Benjamin Haskins-Stiles, who had made a fortune in the South Sea Company before the notorious bubble burst; the current appearance of the mansion can be traced to him.

Styles had the house remodelled in the 1720s. The principal architect was Giacomo Leoni, initially assisted by the painter Sir James Thornhill. Leoni refaced the house with Portland stone and added a great Corinthian portico on the south front and Tuscan colonnades (since removed). Inside, Thornhill was commissioned to paint the Great Hall and the Grand Stair, complete with a dome in imitation of St. Peter's, Rome. However, Thornhill quarrelled with Styles and left the project before its completion. The paintings on the Grand Stair date from 1732 and depict the Origin of the Seasons from Ovid’s Metamorphoses by Francesco Sleter, a Venetian artist who studied under Jacopo Amigoni. All that remains of Styles's work on the Grand Stair is a panel over a doorway, uncovered during restoration work in 2002. After Styles's falling-out with Thornhill, Amigoni was commissioned to paint the four pictures in the Great Hall—the story of Jupiter and Io, also from Ovid's Metamorphoses. The wall paintings in the erroneously named Thornhill Room are probably by Sleter and Amigoni, while the ceiling, which depicts Aurora and the Dawn, was painted somewhat earlier, by Antonio Verrio.

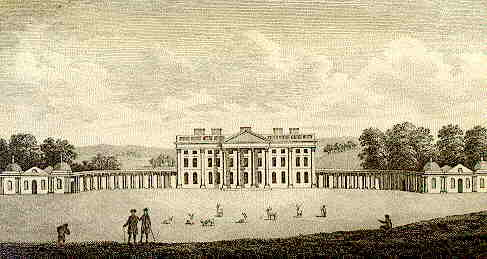
Moor Park in the 1780s.

In 1752 the house was bought by Admiral Lord Anson, who commissioned Capability Brown to remake the formal gardens in sweeping "landscape style" with a small lake. Horace Walpole was not impressed: "I was not much struck with it, after all the miracles I had heard Brown had performed there. He has undulated the horizon in so many artificial molehills, that it is full as unnatural as if it was drawn with a rule and compasses." In 1785 the house was purchased by Thomas Bates Rous formerly of the East India Company and MP for Worcester. After excessive election expenses he was in need of cash and demolished part of the building for its valuable stone. Further owners succeeded at regular intervals until the enlarged estate was sold to the Robert Grosvenor, 1st Baron Ebury in 1828. Earl Grosvenor, son of the Duke of Westminster, built the gateway at Batchworth Heath and planted the pleasure grounds with trees and ornamental shrubs. It is said that the commercial strawberry, a hybrid of the European strawberry and a Chilean species, was first cultivated in the kitchen gardens of Moor Park, as had been the "Moorpark" fuzzless apricot in an earlier day.

Lord Leverhulme purchased Moor Park and commissioned golf-course designer Harry Colt to lay out the courses that now surround the mansion. These opened in 1923.

During the Second World War, the mansion was requisitioned, becoming the Headquarters of the 1st Airborne Corps, who there planned Operation Market Garden, the abortive mission to capture the bridges of the Lower Rhine in 1944. The operation was planned in a first-floor room, now named "the Arnhem Room". Moor Park Golf Club now has its clubhouse in the building, and since buying the freehold of the mansion in 1994 has completely restored and refurbished the building and paintings.
