= Francis Child (died 1713) =

English banker and politician

- A painting of Francis Child by Godfrey Kneller

Lord Mayor of London
- In office 1698–1699
- Preceded by: Sir Humphrey Edwin
- Succeeded by: Sir Richard Levett

Personal details
- Born: 1642
- Died: 1713 (aged 70–71)
- Spouse: Elizabeth Wheeler
- Children: 15; 12 sons and 3 daughters, including Robert and Francis

Sir Francis Child (1642–1713), of Hollybush House, Fulham, Middlesex and the Marygold by Temple Bar, London, was an English banker and politician who sat in the English and British House of Commons between 1698 and 1713. He served as Lord Mayor of London for the year 1698 to 1699. The goldsmith's business which he built up from 1671 later became one of the first London banks, Child & Co.

== Early life ==
Child was born in 1642, the son of Robert Child, clothier, of Heddington in Wiltshire. He came to London at an early age, and was apprenticed in March 1656 to William Hall, a goldsmith of London, for a term of eight years, on the expiration of which he was admitted, 24 March 1664, to the freedom of the Goldsmiths' Company, and on 7 April 1664 to that of the city of London.

== Goldsmiths and Child's Bank ==
The firm of Child & Co. takes its origin from a family of London goldsmiths named Wheeler. John Wheeler, who carried on his business in Chepe, died in 1575. His son, also named John, moved into Fleet Street, and died in 1609. After him William Wheeler, probably his son, moved from his old shop to the Marygold, hitherto a tavern, next door to Temple Bar. He had a son, likewise named William Wheeler, who was admitted a member of the Goldsmiths' Company by patrimony on 27 April 1666. Child married Elizabeth, sister of the younger William Wheeler, aged 19, on 2 October 1671. Her father, the elder William Wheeler, had died in 1663, and his widow married Robert Blanchard, who succeeded to the business at the Marygold, and took Child into partnership, probably about the time of his marriage in 1671. In the little London Directory of 1677, the names of 'Blanchard and Child at the Marygold' are found among the goldsmiths 'that keep running cashes.'

On the death of Blanchard in 1681, Child inherited the bulk of his fortune, and also that of the Wheelers, and in July of the same year the firm became Francis Child and John Rogers. Child was the first banker who gave up the goldsmith's business, and he is called by Pennant 'the father of the profession.' Previous to 1690, the old ledgers of the firm were full of goldsmiths' and pawnbroking accounts mixed up with banking transactions. The sign of the marygold may still be seen in the water-mark of the present cheques, and the original sign is preserved in the front shop over the door which leads into the back premises. It is made of oak, the ground stained green, with a gilt border surrounding a marygold and sun, and the motto 'Ainsi mon ame.' Mr. J. G. Nichols, in the 'Herald and Genealogist' (iv. 508), gives an engraving of the sign. It was probably painted about 1670.

The Devil tavern, which adjoined the Marygold in Fleet Street, was pulled down in 1787, having been purchased by Messrs. Child & Co. for £2,800, and in the following year the row of houses now known as Child's Place was built upon the site. The meetings of Ben Jonson's club had been held in the tavern, and among the relics of the club possessed by Messrs. Child & Co. are a board containing the rules of the club in gold letters, and the bust of Apollo which was formerly placed over the entrance door. Oliver Cromwell is said to have been a customer of the Wheelers, and in later times Nell Gwyn, Titus Oates, Archbishop Tenison, Barbara Villiers, duchess of Cleveland, and many other celebrated persons. For many years Messrs. Child & Co. were tenants of the chamber over Temple Bar, for which they paid the corporation £21 per annum, until the removal of the structure in 1878. They kept here their old ledgers and other books, which amounted in weight to several tons. It has been usual for the firm upon all state occasions to accommodate the lord mayor and corporation with the use of their premises while waiting for royalty at Temple Bar.

== Politics ==
On 6 January 1681 Child was returned after a contest as a representative for St. Dunstan's precinct of the ward of Farringdon Without in the court of common council, one of his opponents being Mr. Taylor of the Devil tavern. It is stated in the 'London Gazette' of 3 December 1683 that the subscriptions towards the lottery of the late Prince Rupert's jewels, valued at £20,000, were paid in to Mr. Child at Temple Bar. The king himself is said to have taken a great interest in the matter, and personally counted the tickets at Whitehall. It is also stated that Child was appointed by the Bishop of London to receive the collection made in February 1682 for the restoration of St. Albans Aabhey.

In October 1689, Child was elected alderman of the ward of Farringdon Without, and on the 29th of the same month he was knighted by William III at Guildhall at the mayoralty banquet. Child was a whig, and now acted as one of the leaders of that party in the corporation. He was admitted a member of the Hon. Artillery Company in February 1690. In 1690 the elections of mayor, sheriffs, and chamberlain were contested on strictly political grounds, the church party putting forward Sir W. Hedges and Thomas Cook for the shrievalty, who were opposed by Child and Sir Edward Clarke on behalf of the whigs. Child headed the poll by a narrow majority. In March 1694 he was elected by the court of lieutenancy to be one of the six colonels of the city trained bands.

Child stood for Parliament at Devizes at the 1695 general election, but was defeated. He was returned unopposed as Member of Parliament for Devizes at the 1698 general election On 29 September 1698 he was elected lord mayor of London for the following year. His inauguration took place on 29 October, and the pageant, prepared for the occasion by Elkanah Settle at the expense of the Company of Goldsmiths, was published in folio, with plates, under the title Glory's Resurrection, be° the Triumphs of London revived, for the inauguration of the Right Honourable Sir Francis Child, Kt., Lord Mayor of the City of London, 1698. This pageant is now very scarce; a copy is preserved in the Guildhall Library. The procession is described in the London Gazette, and appears to have been of more than usual grandeur. The ambassadors who were in town went into the city to see the sight, and on the return from Westminster the civic barges stopped at Dorset Stairs, where the lord mayor and aldermen disembarked and were entertained by the Earl of Dorset. The procession afterwards landing at Blackfriars proceeded to Guildhall, accompanied by the lords justices, who were attended by the life guards and the horse grenadiers. Child is said by Luttrell (iv. 577) to have been 4,000l. out of pocket by the expenses of his year of office. The emoluments of the mayoralty at that time chiefly consisted of the money realised by the sale of such city offices as fell vacant during the year. During his mayoralty he took measures to regulate the price of corn, and appointed officers to attend daily at Queenhithe and post up the prices to prevent imposition upon the public. Child held the post of jeweller to the king, which he resigned in 1697, his successor being Sir Stephen Evans.

Child's vast wealth enabled him to lend the government large sums of money. In August 1692, he joined Sir J. Herne and Sir S. Evans in an advance of £50,000 to the crown to meet the expenses of the government of Ireland.

The forthcoming election of members of parliament for the City of London gave rise to an exciting struggle in December 1700. Child, who was now a member of the Tory party, stood unsuccessfully for London at the 1st general election of 1701, when the four Whig candidates carried the seats. However he was returned again at Devizes at that election and at the second general election in 1701. At the 1702 general election, Child was returned for both Devizes and the City of London, and chose to sit for London. He was master of the Goldsmiths' Company in 1702

At the 1705 general election Child decided not to stand for the City of London and was returned again for Devizes. Then at the 1708 general election he decided not to stand at Devizes, but was defeated at the City of London and left without a parliamentary seat. At the 1710 general election he stood at Devizes with Serjeant Webb but was caught up in a double return and was not seated until 16 December. He appears from the state papers to have been connected in 1711 with the receipt of the land tax for Wiltshire.

== Later life and death ==
Child was a great benefactor to Christ's Hospital, and in 1705, while president, rebuilt the ward over the east cloister at his own cost. His portrait hangs in the hall of the hospital, and another portrait exists at Osterley Park, taken in 1699 in his lord mayor's robes.

For many years he lived at Fulham, in a mansion called East End House, which he built for himself on the east side of Parson's Green. About 1711 he purchased the family seat of Osterley Park; but his son, Sir Robert Child, is said to have been the first of the family who lived there. Child died on 4 October 1713, and was buried in Fulham churchyard, where a monument was erected to his memory.

== Family ==
Lady Child survived her husband a few years, and was also buried at Fulham, 27 February 1719–20. Child had twelve sons and three daughters, and was succeeded in the firm and also as alderman of Farringdon, by his sons Robert Child, and Francis Child, both of whom were afterwards knighted. His daughter Elizabeth married Tyringham Backwell, son of Alderman Edward Backwell, the great goldsmith, who was ruined by the closing of the exchequer by Charles II in 1672.

Two of the sons from this marriage, Barnaby and William, afterwards became partners in Childs' bank.

== Notes ==
Civic offices
Preceded by Sir Humphrey Edwin	Lord Mayor of London; 1698 – 1699	Succeeded by Sir Richard Levett
