= John Lee (1695–1761) =

British politician

John Lee (8 May 1695 – November 1761), was a British politician.

He was a younger son of Sir Thomas Lee, 2nd Baronet of Hartwell House, Buckinghamshire and the brother of Sir George Lee and Sir William Lee, Lord Chief Justice.

He was the Member of Parliament (MP) for Malmesbury (3 July 1747 – 1754) and for Newport (23 April 1754 – 1761).
