= John Nicholas (Devizes MP) =

English politician

John Nicholas (1691–1746), of Roundway Park, near Devizes, Wiltshire, was an English politician.

He was the second son of Robert Nicholas of Roundway Park.

He was a member (MP) of the parliament of England for Devizes from 1713 to 1715.

He died unmarried. Roundway had been left to his half-brother Edward.
