= John Eyles (Devizes MP) =

English politician

John Eyles (died 1703), of Great St. Helens, London and Southbroom, near Devizes, Wiltshire, was an English politician.

== Biography ==
He was the son of John Eyles, a woolstapler of Devizes and the older brother of Sir Francis Eyles, 1st Baronet (died 1716), with whom he went into business as "Eyles & Co".

He was a member (MP) of the Parliament of England for Devizes in October 1679, and briefly Lord Mayor of London for September–October 1688. He was knighted on 15 August 1687.

He died in 1703 and was buried at St Helen's Church, Bishopsgate on 5 July. He had married Sarah Cowper of London and had 2 sons and 5 daughters. His daughter, Sarah Eyles, married Joseph Haskin Stiles and their daughter, Mary Haskin Styles, was married to Sir John Eyles, 2nd Baronet.
