= George Heathcote =

English merchant, philanthropist and Tory politician

George Heathcote (7 December 1700 – 7 June 1768) was an English merchant and philanthropist and Tory politician who sat in the House of Commons from 1727 to 1747. He was sheriff of the City of London in 1739 and Lord Mayor of London in 1742.

== Early life ==
He was born in Jamaica, the son of Josiah Heathcote, a West India Merchant of London, and his wife, Catherine, widow of Thomas Barrett of Jamaica. He was a nephew of Sir Gilbert Heathcote, 1st Baronet, Governor of the Bank of England and Caleb Heathcote, who served as Mayor of New York City. He was educated at Clare College, Cambridge and the Middle Temple (which he entered in 1720).

== Merchant career ==
From 1730 to 1733 he was a director of the South Sea Company and the Master of the Salters' Company in 1737. In 1729 he was elected a Fellow of the Royal Society.

== Political career ==
From 1727 to 1734 he was Member of Parliament for Hindon, Wiltshire and from 1734 to 1741 the MP for Southwark.

He served as an Alderman for the Walbrook ward of the City of London from 1739 to 1749, was elected a Sheriff of the City of London for 1740, and elected Lord Mayor of London in 1742. He also served in Parliament from 1741 to 1747 as the representative for the City of London.

He was an opponent of Robert Walpole's government ministry and a follower of William Wyndham's opposition Tory party. He was also a Jacobite, a supporter of the exiled House of Stuart and was actively involved in the 1752 Elibank Plot to restore of the Stuart dynasty.

== Philanthropic Work ==
Heathcote was a member of the Associates of the Late Dr. Thomas Bray, a philanthropic organization. After the death of Dr. Bray in 1730, the Associates petitioned to create a new colony for relief of debtors, among other purposes. In 1732, the Associates were granted a royal charter founding the Trustees for the Establishment of the Colony of Georgia in America. Heathcote was active in planning the colony with James Oglethorpe (see Oglethorpe Plan), and he served as treasurer for the Trustees.

Heathcote was a member of the Masonic Lodge at the Rummer Tavern, Charing Cross and was known as the wealthiest commoner in England when he died in 1768 aged 67. He had married Maria, the daughter of John Eyles, MP, of Wiltshire; they had two sons and two daughters.

Civic offices
Preceded by Sir Robert Godshall	Lord Mayor of London; 1742	Succeeded by Sir Robert Willimot
