= 1922 City of London by-election =

← 1918	19 May 1922	1922 (GE) →

Constituency of City of London
- Turnout: 36.96%
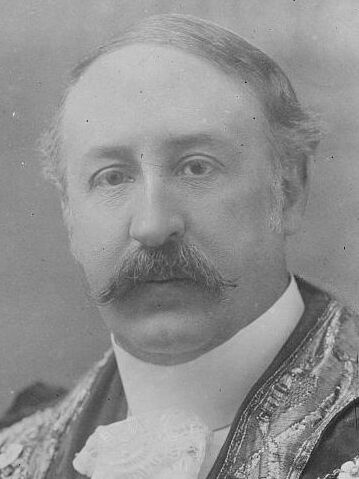
	First party	Second party
	UP
Candidate	Edward Grenfell	Vansittart Bowater
Party	Unionist	Ind. Unionist
Popular vote	10,114	6,178
Percentage	62.08%	37.92%
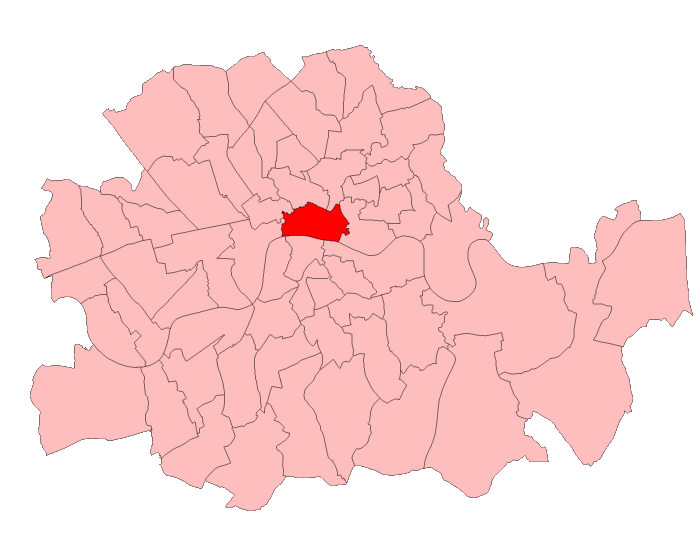
- A map of parliamentary constituencies within the County of London at the time of the by-election, with City of London highlighted in red.
MP before election
Arthur Balfour
Unionist
Subsequent MP
Edward Grenfell
Unionist

The 1922 City of London by-election was a parliamentary by-election held on 19 May 1922 for the British House of Commons constituency of City of London, which covered the "Square Mile" which was the United Kingdom's traditional financial district.

The seat had become vacant on the elevation to the peerage of one of the constituency's two Unionist Members of Parliament (MPs), Arthur James Balfour, as the Earl of Balfour.

Balfour had held the seat since a by-election in 1906, following his defeat at Manchester East in the 1906 general election. He had also been prime minister between 1902 and 1905.

== Candidates ==
The Unionist Party selected as its candidate Edward Grenfell, who was a director of the Bank of England. Sir Vansittart Bowater, who had been Lord Mayor of London in 1913, stood as an Independent Unionist.

== Result ==
Turnout was unsurprisingly low in the first contested election in the City since the first 1910 general election. Grenfell won the seat by a convincing margin.

Curiously, Bowater would go on to be elected as the official Unionist candidate at a by-election in 1924, and he and Grenfell would share the representation of the City until 1935.

By-Election 19 May 1922: City of London
Party	Candidate	Votes	%	±%
Unionist	Edward Grenfell	10,114	62.08	N/A
Ind. Unionist	Vansittart Bowater	6,178	37.92	New
Majority		3,936	24.16	N/A
Turnout		16,292	36.96	N/A
Unionist hold		Swing	N/A	

== Previous election ==
General election 14 December 1918: City of London (2 seats)
Party		Candidate	Votes	%	±%
C	Unionist	Arthur Balfour	Unopposed		
C	Unionist	Frederick Banbury	Unopposed		
	Unionist hold				
	Unionist hold				
C indicates candidate endorsed by the coalition government.

== See also ==
- List of United Kingdom by-elections
- City of London constituency
- 1904 City of London by-election
- February 1906 City of London by-election
- June 1906 City of London by-election
- 1924 City of London by-election
- 1935 City of London by-election
- 1938 City of London by-election
- 1940 City of London by-election
- 1945 City of London by-election
