= 1924 City of London by-election =

UK parliamentary by-election

The 1924 City of London by-election was a parliamentary by-election held on 1 February 1924 for the British House of Commons constituency of City of London, which covered the "Square Mile" which was the United Kingdom's traditional financial district.

The seat had become vacant on the elevation to the peerage of one of the constituency's two Conservative Members of Parliament (MPs), Sir Frederick Banbury, as Baron Banbury of Southam.

Banbury had held the seat since a 1906 by-election, following his defeat at Peckham in the 1906 general election. He had represented Peckham since 1892.

== Candidates ==
The Conservative Party selected as its candidate Sir Vansittart Bowater, who had been Lord Mayor of London in 1913. He had stood as an Independent Conservative in the 1922 by-election.

The Liberal Party selected Henry Bell, who was a managing director of Lloyds Bank. This was the first time the Liberals had contested the City since the January 1910 election.

== Result ==
Bowater was comfortably elected, and would represent the constituency until his death in 1938, precipitating another by-election.

City of London by-election, 1924
Party	Candidate	Votes	%	±%
Conservative	Vansittart Bowater	12,962	70.11	N/A
Liberal	Henry Bell	5,525	29.89	New
Majority		7,437	40.22	N/A
Turnout		18,487	41.89	N/A
Conservative hold		Swing	N/A	

== Previous election ==
General election 6 December 1923: City of London (2 seats)
Party	Candidate	Votes	%	±%
Conservative	Frederick Banbury	Unopposed	N/A	N/A
Conservative	Edward Grenfell	Unopposed	N/A	N/A
Conservative hold				
Conservative hold				

== See also ==
- List of United Kingdom by-elections
- City of London constituency
- 1922 City of London by-election
- 1935 City of London by-election
- 1938 City of London by-election
- 1940 City of London by-election
- 1945 City of London by-election
