= City of London by-election, 1906 =

City of London by-election, 1906 may refer to:

- February 1906 City of London by-election
- June 1906 City of London by-election
