= February 1906 City of London by-election =

UK parliamentary by-election

- 27 February 1906

Constituency of City of London
- Turnout: 63.19% (▼5.5%)
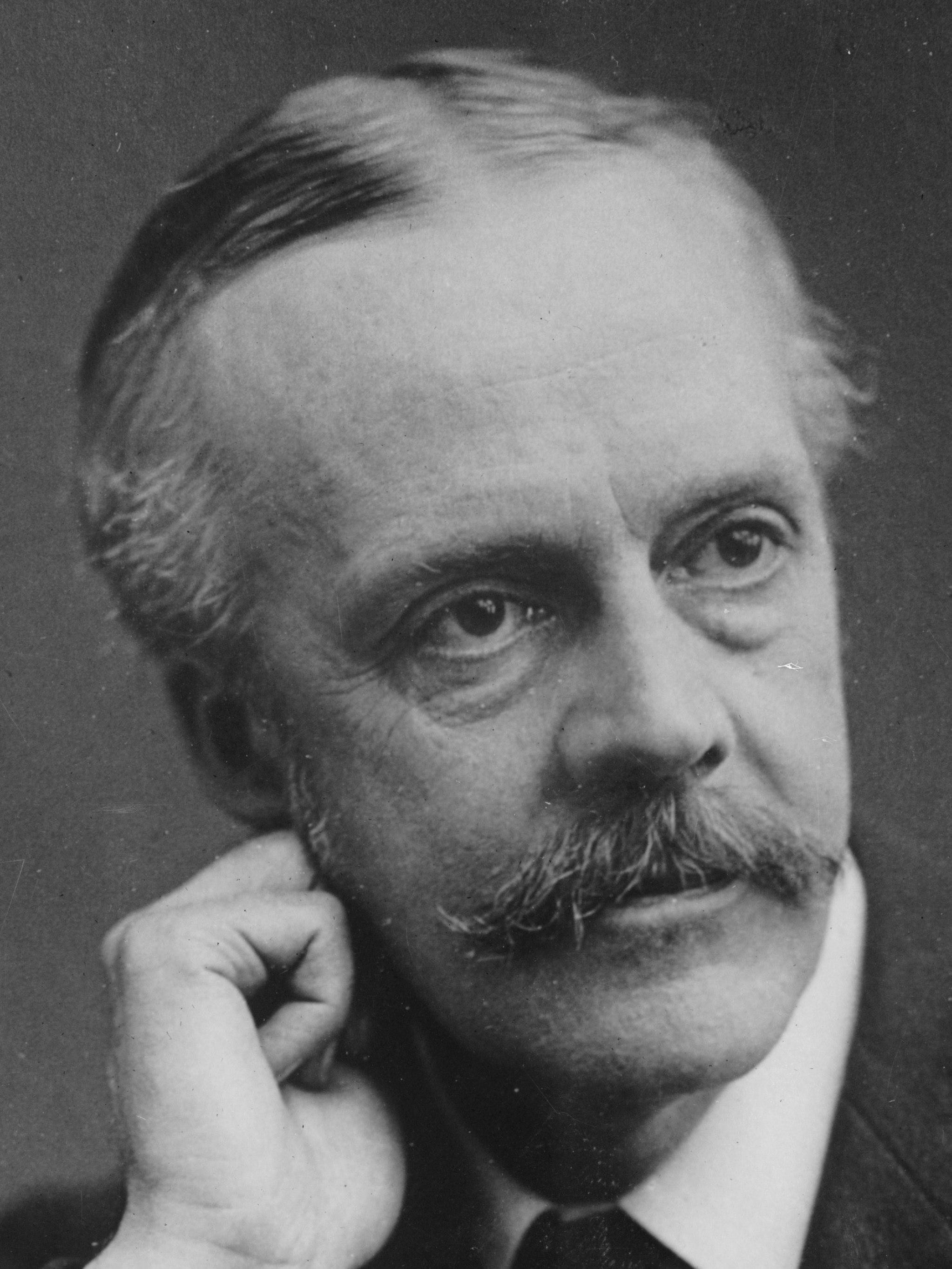

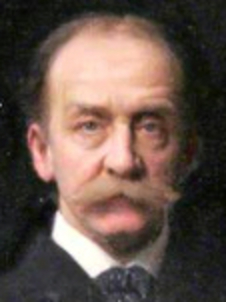
	First party	Second party
Candidate	Arthur Balfour	Thomas Gibson Bowles
Party	Conservative	Free Trader
Popular vote	15,474	4,134
Percentage	78.92%	21.08%
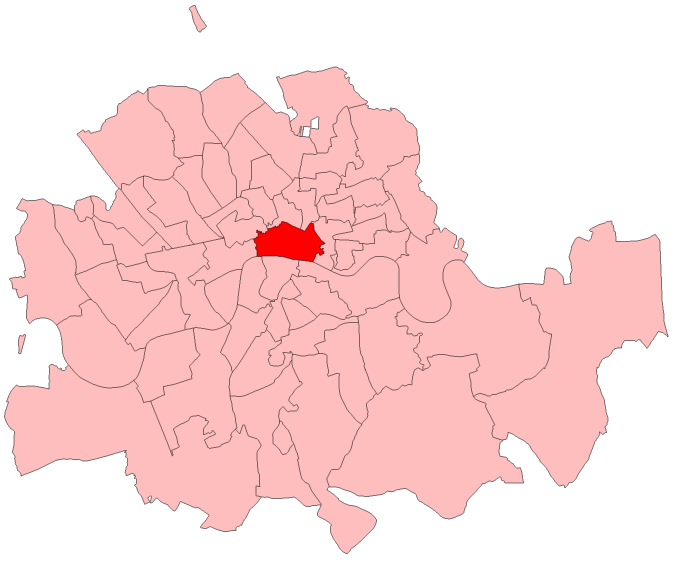
- A map of parliamentary constituencies within the County of London at the time of the by-election, with City of London highlighted in red.
MP before election
Alban Gibbs
Conservative
Subsequent MP
Arthur Balfour
Conservative

The February 1906 City of London by-election was a parliamentary by-election held on 27 February 1906 for the British House of Commons constituency of City of London, which covered the "Square Mile" which was the United Kingdom's traditional financial district.

The seat had become vacant on the resignation of Alban Gibbs, one of the constituency's two Conservative Members of Parliament (MPs). Gibbs had resigned in order to provide a safe seat for Arthur Balfour. He would go on to succeed his father, Hucks Gibbs, as Baron Aldenham the following year.

Balfour had been out of Parliament following his defeat at Manchester East in the 1906 general election. He had been prime minister between 1902 and 1905 and at the time was Leader of the Conservative Party, with Joseph Chamberlain filling in as Leader of the Opposition while Balfour was out of Parliament.

== Candidates ==
65-year old Thomas Gibson Bowles, who had been Unionist Member of Parliament for King's Lynn from 1892 until 1906 stood as a Free Trader candidate. The Free Traders were a group of former Conservatives opposed to Balfour's policy of tariff reform, instead preferring free trade.

== Result ==
City of London by-election, February 1906
Party	Candidate	Votes	%	±%
Conservative	Arthur Balfour	15,474	78.92	+78.92
Free Trader	Thomas Gibson Bowles	4,134	21.08	+21.08
Majority		11,340	57.84	+33.3
Turnout		19,608	63.19	−5.5
Conservative hold		Swing		

== Previous election ==
1906 general election: City of London (2 seats)
Party	Candidate	Votes	%	±%
Conservative	Edward Clarke	16,019	38.13	N/A
Conservative	Alban Gibbs	15,619	37.17	N/A
Liberal	Felix Schuster	5,313	12.65	New
Liberal	Joseph West Ridgeway	5,064	12.05	New
Majority		10,306	24.5	N/A
Turnout		42,005	68.7	N/A
Conservative hold		Swing	N/A	
Conservative hold		Swing	N/A	

== See also ==
- List of United Kingdom by-elections
- City of London constituency
- 1887 City of London by-election
- April 1891 City of London by-election
- June 1891 City of London by-election
- 1904 City of London by-election
- June 1906 City of London by-election
- 1922 City of London by-election
- 1938 City of London by-election
- 1940 City of London by-election
