= 1938 City of London by-election =

UK parliamentary by-election

The 1938 City of London by-election was a by-election held on 6 April 1938 for the British House of Commons constituency of City of London, which covered the "Square Mile" which was the United Kingdom's traditional financial district.

The by-election was caused by the death of one of the City's two Conservative Party Members of Parliament (MPs) Thomas Vansittart Bowater, who had held the seat since a by-election in 1924, having contested the seat in an earlier by-election in 1922.

The Conservative candidate, Sir George Broadbridge, who had been Lord Mayor of London in 1936, was returned unopposed.

== Result ==
By-election 6 April 1938: City of London
Party	Candidate	Votes	%	±%
Conservative	George Broadbridge	Unopposed	N/A	N/A
Conservative hold				

== Previous election ==
General election 14 November 1935: City of London (2 seats)
Party	Candidate	Votes	%	±%
Conservative	Alan Anderson	Unopposed	N/A	N/A
Conservative	Vansittart Bowater	Unopposed	N/A	N/A
Conservative hold				
Conservative hold				

== See also ==
- List of United Kingdom by-elections
- City of London constituency
- 1922 City of London by-election
- 1924 City of London by-election
- 1935 City of London by-election
- 1940 City of London by-election
- 1945 City of London by-election
