= Peter Broadbridge, 3rd Baron Broadbridge =

The Right Honourable The Lord Broadbridge

Member of the House of Lords
- Lord Temporal
- In office 1 November 1972 – 11 November 1999 as a hereditary peer
- Preceded by: The 2nd Baron Broadbridge
- Succeeded by: Seat abolished (Note: Pursuant to the House of Lords Act 1999.)

Personal details
- Born: Peter Hewett Broadbridge; 19 August 1938
- Died: 6 February 2000 (aged 61)
- Political party: Crossbench

Peter Hewett Broadbridge, 3rd Baron Broadbridge (19 August 1938 – 6 February 2000), was a Deputy Speaker in the House of Lords from 1994 to 1999.

The son of Eric Broadbridge, 2nd Baron Broadbridge, he was educated at Hurstpierpoint College and St Catherine's College, Oxford.

== Arms ==
Coat of arms of Peter Broadbridge, 3rd Baron Broadbridge
Crest A dolphin hauriant Argent between two gilly-flowers Gules slipped and leaved Vert. Escutcheon Gules in chief two pens in saltire and in base over water a stone bridge of a single span embattled Proper. Supporters On either side a dolphin Proper charged with a sword erect Gules. Motto Industria Et Perseverantia (By Industry & Perseverance)

== Notes ==
Peerage of the United Kingdom
Preceded by Eric Broadbridge	Baron Broadbridge; 1972–2000; Member of the House of Lords (1972–1999)	Succeeded by Martin Broadbridge
Baronetage of the United Kingdom
Preceded by Eric Broadbridge	Baronet of Wargrave Place; 1972–2000	Succeeded by Martin Broadbridge
