= George Broadbridge, 1st Baron Broadbridge =

British Conservative politician

The Right Honourable The Lord Broadbridge KCVO KStJ DL JP FRGS FCIS
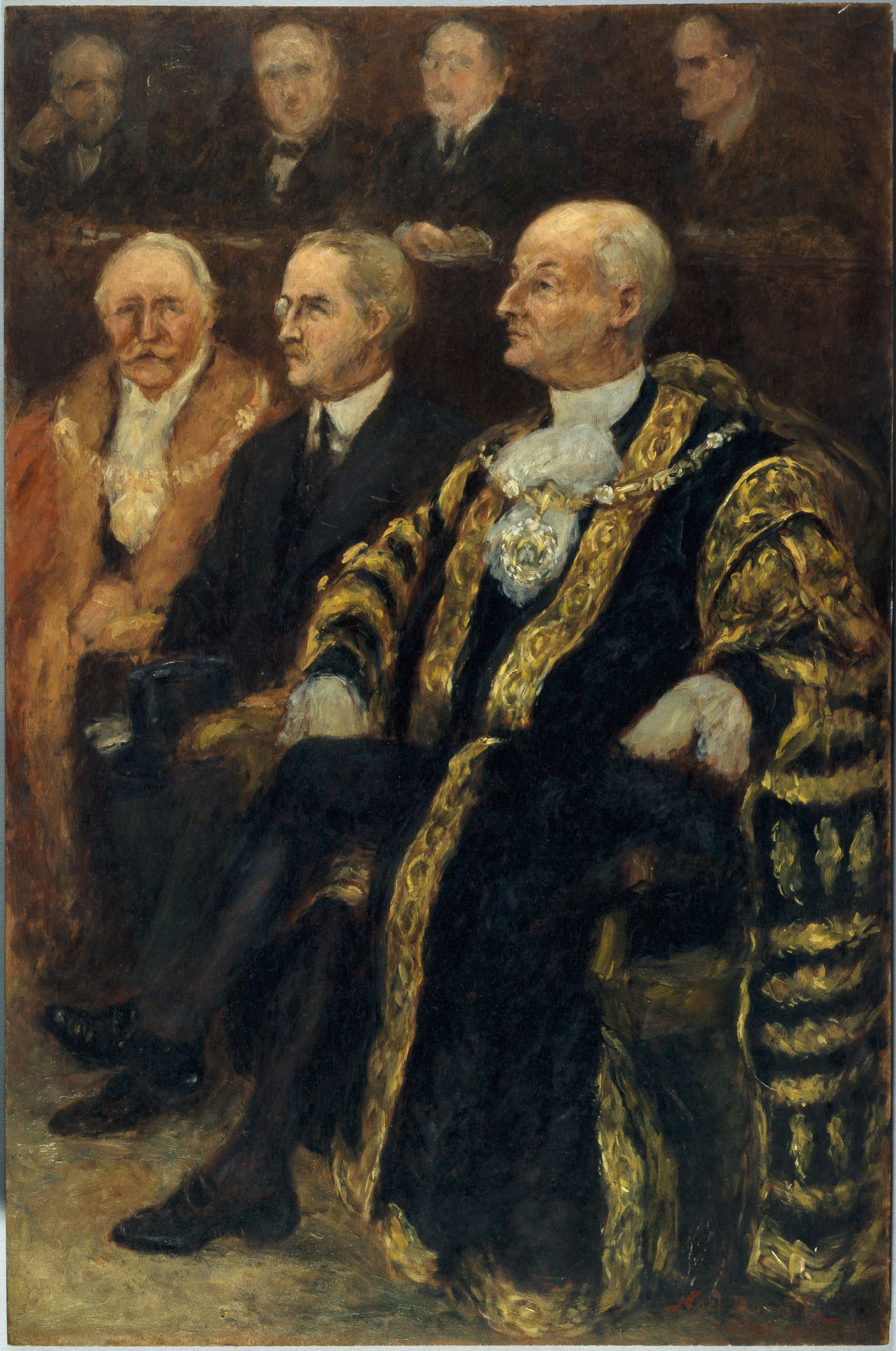
- Broadbridge (right) and Sir Eric Phipps in June 1937

Member of Parliament for City of London
- In office 1938–1945

Lord Mayor of London
- In office 1936–1937

Personal details
- Born: George Thomas Broadbridge; 13 February 1869
- Died: 17 April 1952 (aged 83)

George Thomas Broadbridge, 1st Baron Broadbridge (13 February 1869 – 17 April 1952) was a British Conservative Party politician, most prominently in the City of London.

Broadbridge was sometime Alderman of the Candlewick Ward of the City and then Sheriff of the City of London from 1933 to 1934 and became Master of the Worshipful Company of Gardeners that year. He then became Lord Mayor of London in 1936 and on leaving that office a year later, was created a baronet.

In 1937, Broadbridge formally opened the Municipal Buildings for Gillingham Borough Council on 25 September.

He was elected unopposed as Member of Parliament (MP) for the City of London at a by-election in April 1938, and held the seat until September 1945 when he was raised to the peerage as Baron Broadbridge. On his death in 1952, he was succeeded in the title by his son Eric.

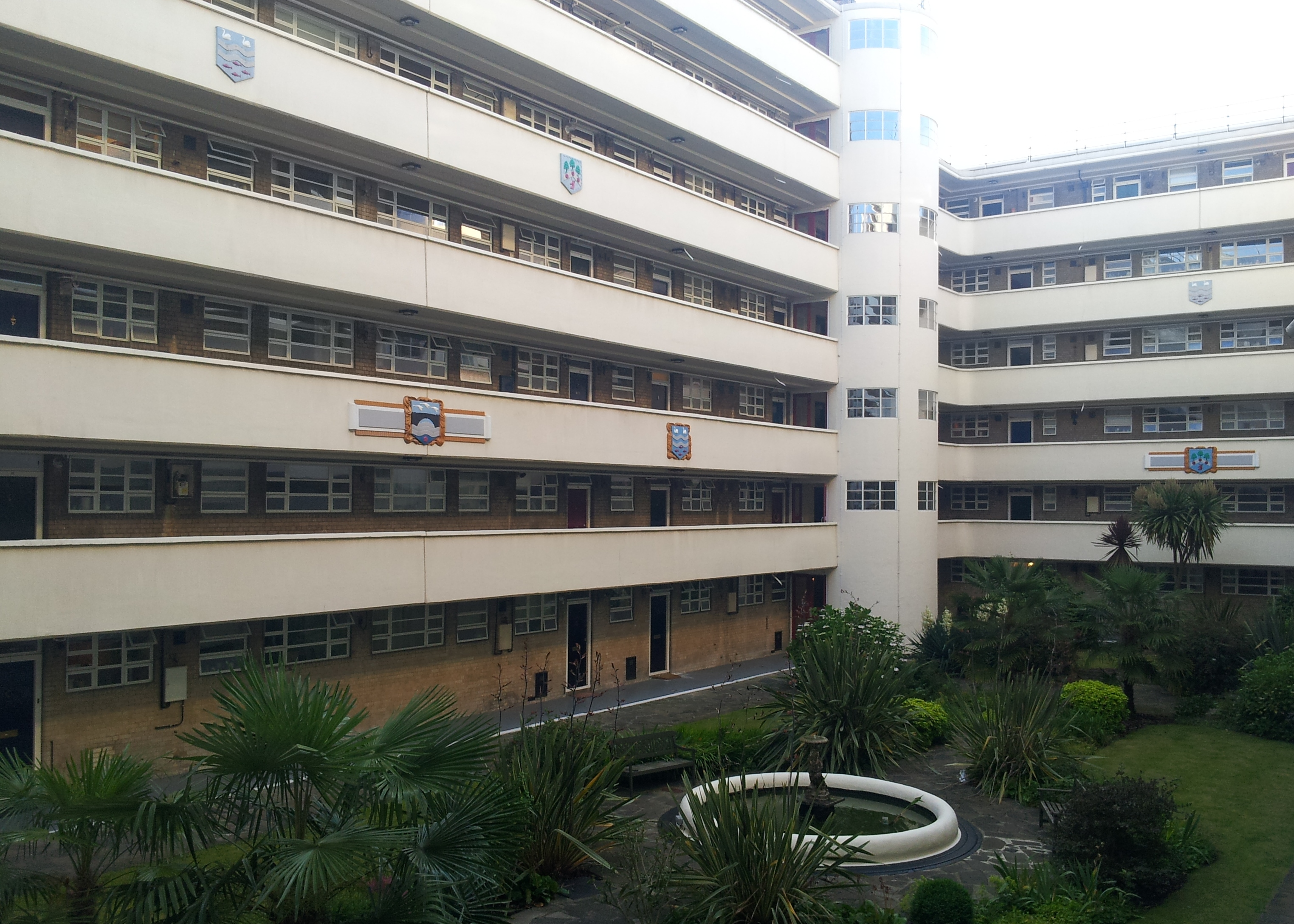
Courtyard of Lichfield Court

In 1933, he acquired a Queen Anne building, Lichfield House, in Richmond which he demolished and replaced by two blocks of flats, Lichfield Court, totalling 211 flats in all. These were built in the Art Deco style and are now Grade II listed.

== Arms ==
Coat of arms of George Broadbridge, 1st Baron Broadbridge
Crest A dolphin hauriant Argent between two gilly-flowers Gules slipped and leaved Vert. Escutcheon Gules in chief two pens in saltire and in base over water a stone bridge of a single span embattled Proper. Supporters On either side a dolphin Proper charged with a sword erect Gules. Motto Industria Et Perseverantia (By Industry & Perseverance)

Parliament of the United Kingdom
Preceded by Sir Vansittart Bowater, Bt; Sir Alan Anderson	Member of Parliament for City of London; 1938–1945; With: Sir Alan Anderson to 1940; Sir Andrew Duncan from 1940	Succeeded by Ralph Assheton; Sir Andrew Duncan
Peerage of the United Kingdom
New creation	Baron Broadbridge; 1945–1952	Succeeded by Eric Broadbridge
Baronetage of the United Kingdom
New creation	Baronet of Wargrave Place; 1937–1952	Succeeded by Eric Broadbridge
