= Martin Broadbridge, 4th Baron Broadbridge =

British hereditary peer (1929–2020)

Martin Hugh Broadbridge, 4th Baron Broadbridge (29 November 1929 – 19 April 2020), was a British hereditary peer.

== Biography ==
Broadbridge was born 29 November 1929, son of Hugh Trevor Broadbridge (1903–1979), by his wife the former Anne Marjorie Elfick (1903–1979).

He was educated at St George's College, Weybridge, a private Catholic school in Surrey, England. He studied at the University of Birmingham, graduating with a Bachelor of Science (BSc) degree in 1954.

From 1954 to 1963, Broadbridge was a member of Her Majesty's Overseas Civil Service (HMOCS), and served as a district officer in Northern Nigeria. Returning to the United Kingdom, he was director and manager for a specialist road surface treatments company from 1963 to 1992. In retirement, he continued to work as a consultant.

When Peter Broadbridge, 3rd Baron Broadbridge, died on 6 February 2000, he was succeeded to the peerage and baronetcy by Martin, his cousin, who became the 4th Baron Broadbridge.

Broadbridge died in Cardiff, Wales, on 19 April 2020. He was 90.

=== Personal life ===
On 31 July 1954, he married Norma Sheffield, daughter of Major Herbert Sheffield, MC: they divorced in 1967. He married secondly, in 1968, Mary Elizabeth Trotman (1923–2007), daughter of Joseph Emlyn Trotman (1893–1966). He had a son, Richard, and a daughter, Katherine, from his first marriage. The son, Air Vice-Marshal Richard John Martin Broadbridge, CB (born 20 January 1959), succeeded to the peerage and baronetcy as Richard Broadbridge, 5th Baron Broadbridge.

Peerage of the United Kingdom
Preceded by Peter Broadbridge	Baron Broadbridge; 2000–2020	Succeeded by Richard Broadbridge
Baronetage of the United Kingdom
Preceded by Peter Broadbridge	Baronet of Wargrave Place; 2000–2020	Succeeded by Richard Broadbridge
