= Richard Broadbridge, 5th Baron Broadbridge =

British RAF vice-marshal

Air Vice-Marshal The Right Honourable The Lord Broadbridge CB, KHS, FRAeS, FRCGP
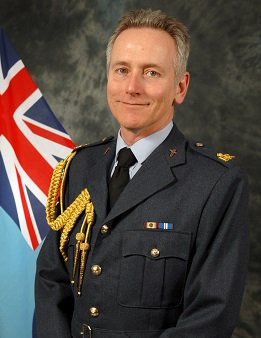
- Born: Richard John Martin Broadbridge; 20 January 1959 (age 67)
- Military career
- Allegiance: United Kingdom
- Branch: Royal Air Force
- Service years: 1981–2024
- Rank: Air Vice-Marshal
- Unit: RAF Medical Services
- Awards: Companion of the Order of the Bath

Air Vice-Marshal Richard John Martin Broadbridge, 5th Baron Broadbridge (born 20 January 1959), is a British physician, senior Royal Air Force officer, and hereditary peer. Having joined the RAF in 1981, he rose to serve as Director of Healthcare Delivery and Training, Defence Medical Services from 2014 to 2018 and acting Surgeon General in 2017. He transferred to the Royal Air Force Reserve on 5 February 2018, and succeeded his father as Baron Broadbridge in 2020. Broadbridge's commission in the RAF was terminated on 30 October 2024.

== Honours ==
On 18 September 2009, Broadbridge was made Honorary Surgeon to The Queen (QHS).

In 2014, he was admitted as a Member of the Order of St John

He was appointed a Companion of the Order of the Bath (CB) in the 2018 New Year Honours.

== Arms ==
Coat of arms of Richard Broadbridge, 5th Baron Broadbridge
Coronet That of a baron Crest A dolphin hauriant Argent between two gilly-flowers Gules slipped and leaved Vert. Escutcheon Gules in chief two pens in saltire and in base over water a stone bridge of a single span embattled Proper. Supporters On either side a dolphin Proper charged with a sword erect Gules. Motto Industria Et Perseverantia (By Industry & Perseverance)

Military offices
Preceded by Alasdair Walker	Acting Surgeon-General of the United Kingdom Armed Forces; 2017	Succeeded by Martin Bricknell
Peerage of the United Kingdom
Preceded by Martin Broadbridge	Baron Broadbridge; 2020–present	Incumbent; Heir apparent: Hon. Mark Broadbridge
Baronetage of the United Kingdom
Preceded by Martin Broadbridge	Baronet of Wargrave Place; 2020–present	Incumbent; Heir apparent: Hon. Mark Broadbridge
