= Baron Broadbridge =

Barony in the Peerage of the United Kingdom

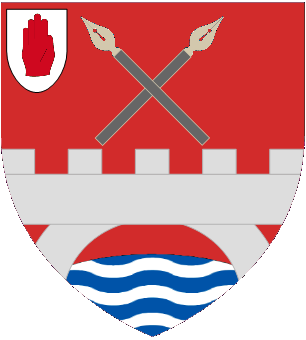
- Gules in chief two pens in saltire and in base over water a stone bridge of a single span embattled Proper
- Creation date: c. 1945
- Created by: King George VI
- Peerage: Peerage of the United Kingdom
- First holder: George Broadbridge, 1st Baron Broadbridge
- Present holder: Richard Broadbridge, 5th Baron Broadbridge
- Heir apparent: Mark Andrew Broadbridge
- Remainder to: Heirs male of the body lawfully begotten
- Status: Extant
- Motto: Industria Et Perseverantia ("Industry & Perseverance")

Baron Broadbridge, of Brighton in the County of Sussex, is a title in the Peerage of the United Kingdom. It was created in 1945 for the Conservative politician Sir George Broadbridge, 1st Baronet. He had already been created a Baronet, of Wargrave Place in the County of Berkshire, on 22 November 1937. The title descended from father to son until the death of his grandson, the third Baron, in 2000. The late Baron was succeeded by his first cousin, who became the fourth holder of the titles. He was the son of Hugh Trevor Broadbridge, third son of the first Baron. He was in turn succeeded by his only son, Richard, a retired air vice-marshal who was honorary surgeon to the Queen, in 2020.

== Broadbridge baronets, of Wargrave Place (1937) ==
- George Thomas Broadbridge, 1st Baronet (1869–1952) (created Baron Broadbridge in 1945)

=== Baron Broadbridge (1945) ===
- George Thomas Broadbridge, 1st Baron Broadbridge (1869–1952)
- Eric Wilberforce Broadbridge, 2nd Baron Broadbridge (1895–1972)
- Peter Hewett Broadbridge, 3rd Baron Broadbridge (1938–2000)
- Martin Hugh Broadbridge, 4th Baron Broadbridge (1929–2020)
- Richard John Martin Broadbridge, 5th Baron Broadbridge (born 1959)

The heir apparent and sole heir to the peerage is the present holder's son, the Hon. Mark Andrew Broadbridge (born 1983).

=== Title succession chart ===
Title succession chart, Barons Broadbridge.

George Broadbridge; 1st Baron Broadbridge; 1869–1952
Eric Broadbridge; 2nd Baron Broadbridge; 1895–1972	Hon. Ralph Broadbridge; 1901–1983	Hon. Hugh Broadbridge; 1903–1979
Peter Broadbridge; 3rd Baron Broadbridge; 1938–2000	Martin Broadbridge; 4th Baron Broadbridge; 1929–2020
Richard Broadbridge; 5th Baron Broadbridge born 1959
Hon. Mark Broadbridge born 1983

== Arms ==
Coat of arms of Baron Broadbridge
Crest A dolphin hauriant Argent between two gilly-flowers Gules slipped and leaved Vert. Escutcheon Gules in chief two pens in saltire and in base over water a stone bridge of a single span embattled Proper. Supporters On either side a dolphin Proper charged with a sword erect Gules. Motto Industria Et Perseverantia (By Industry & Perseverance)
