= Sir David Burnett, 1st Baronet =

Col, Sir David Burnett Bt
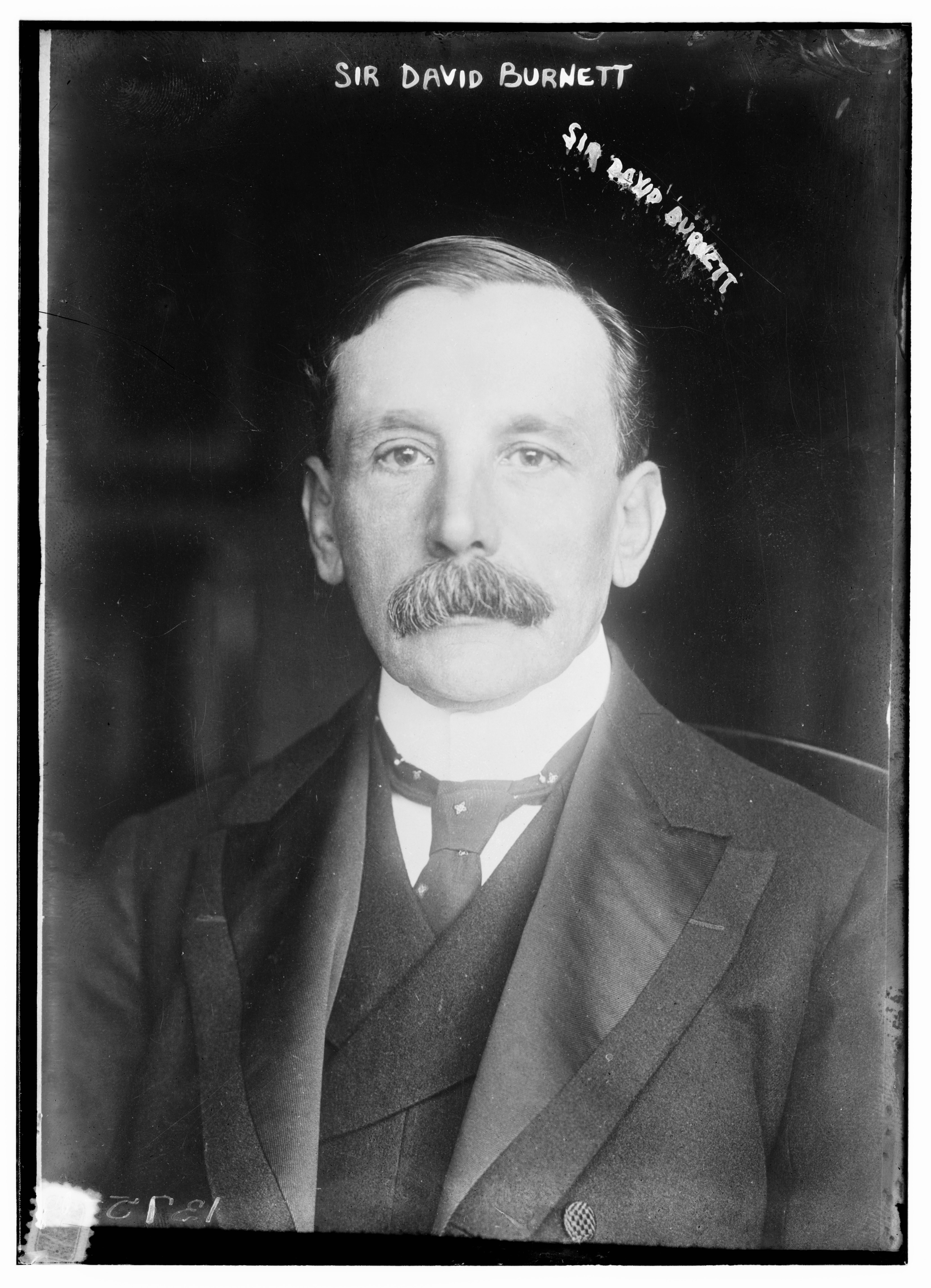

Lord Mayor of London
- In office 1912–1913
- Preceded by: Thomas Crosby
- Succeeded by: Sir Vansittart Bowater

Sheriff of London
- In office 1907–1908 Serving with Charles Wakefield

Personal details
- Born: 22 August 1851
- Died: 7 July 1930 (aged 78)
- Spouse: Emily Sleap (m. 1875)
- Children: 6
- Occupation: Surveyor, politician

Sir David Burnett, 1st Baronet (22 August 1851 – 7 July 1930) was a Lord Mayor of London. Knighted in 1908 and created Baronet Burnett, of Selborne House, in the Borough of Croydon in 1913, he was a surveyor and local politician active in the City of London.

A Fellow of the Surveyors Institute from 1881, he became a member of the Common Council of London representing Candlewick Ward in 1888, rising to be an alderman in 1902. He was Sheriff of the City of London in 1907-08, and Lord Mayor of London in 1912-13.

== Family ==
He married Emily Sleap, daughter of Thomas Sleap, on 28 August 1875. The couple had six children.

== See also ==
- Burnett baronets
