= Andrew Duncan (businessman) =

British businessman and government minister (1882–1952)

The Right Honourable Sir Andrew Duncan GBE
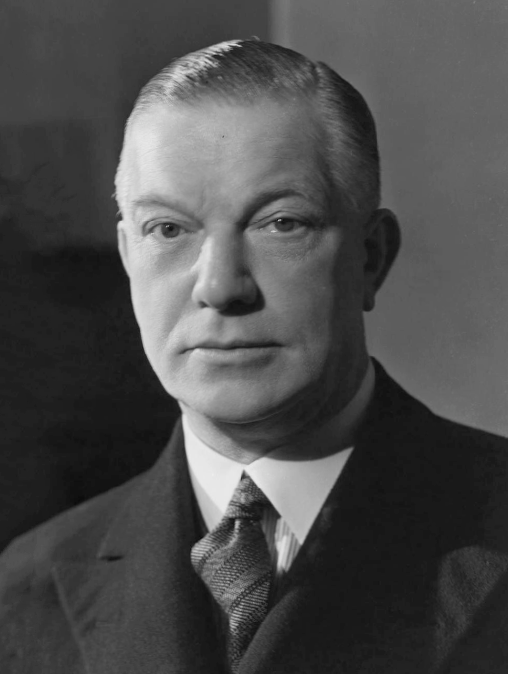
- Duncan in the 1940s

President of the Board of Trade
- In office 5 January 1940 – 3 October 1940
- Prime Minister: Neville Chamberlain; Winston Churchill
- Preceded by: Oliver Stanley
- Succeeded by: Oliver Lyttelton
- In office 29 June 1941 – 4 February 1942
- Prime Minister: Winston Churchill
- Preceded by: Oliver Lyttelton
- Succeeded by: John Jestyn Llewellin

Minister of Supply
- In office 3 October 1940 – 29 June 1941
- Prime Minister: Winston Churchill
- Preceded by: Herbert Morrison
- Succeeded by: Max Aitken
- In office 4 February 1942 – 26 July 1945
- Prime Minister: Winston Churchill
- Preceded by: Max Aitken
- Succeeded by: John Wilmot

Personal details
- Born: Andrew Rae Duncan; 3 June 1884 Irvine, Ayrshire, Scotland
- Died: 30 March 1952 (aged 67) Westminster, London, England

Sir Andrew Rae Duncan (3 June 1884 – 30 March 1952) was a British businessman who was brought into government during World War II, serving twice as both President of the Board of Trade and Minister of Supply.

Duncan was a Director of the Bank of England and of Imperial Chemical Industries. He was chairman of the Central Electricity Board from 1927 to 1935, and chairman of the British Iron and Steel Federation from 1935 until 1945. He was elected as a "National" Member of Parliament (MP) for the City of London in a 1940 by-election and was made a member of the Cabinet and a Privy Counsellor. He was re-elected at the 1945 election, and stepped down at the 1950 general election.

During his time in the ministerial office, there was some concern that someone so closely involved with the iron, steel and chemical industries was in charge of their regulation. However, wartime pressures kept Duncan in the post and he was undamaged. He returned to the Iron and Steel Federation after the war, working to resist the Labour government's nationalisation plans with Aubrey Jones, his assistant, later a Conservative minister.

He was knighted in 1921 and appointed a Knight Grand Cross of the Order of the British Empire (GBE) in 1938. He was also awarded the Italian Order of Saints Maurice and Lazarus.

In addition to his service in the United Kingdom, Duncan was appointed in 1926 by Canadian prime minister William Lyon Mackenzie King in response to the Maritime Rights Movement to chair the Royal Commission on Maritime Claims, which was thus nicknamed the "Duncan Commission".

In 1916, he married Anne Jordan. They had two sons, one of whom was killed in action in 1940. He died in his sleep on 30 March 1952, aged 67.

Honorary titles
Preceded by Claude Hope Hope-Morley	High Sheriff of the County of London; 1939–1940	Succeeded by Basil Catterns
Parliament of the United Kingdom
Preceded by Alan Anderson; George Broadbridge	Member of Parliament for The City of London; 1940–1950; With: George Broadbridge 1940–1945; Ralph Assheton 1945–1950	Constituency abolished
Political offices
Preceded by Oliver Stanley	President of the Board of Trade; 1940	Succeeded by Oliver Lyttelton
Preceded by Herbert Morrison	Minister of Supply; 1940–1941	Succeeded by The Lord Beaverbrook
Preceded by Oliver Lyttelton	President of the Board of Trade; 1941–1942	Succeeded by John Llewellin
Preceded by The Lord Beaverbrook	Minister of Supply; 1942–1945	Succeeded by John Wilmot
