= Alan Anderson (British public servant) =

British civil servant, politician & shipowner (1877–1952)

Sir Alan Anderson GBE DL
- Anderson in 1918.

Member of Parliament for City of London
- In office 1935–1940
- Preceded by: Edward Grenfell; Sir Vansittart Bowater, Bt.
- Succeeded by: Sir George Broadbridge, Bt; Andrew Duncan

Personal details
- Born: Alan Garrett Anderson; 9 March 1877
- Died: 4 May 1952 (aged 75)
- Spouse: Muriel Duncan
- Children: 4
- Parent(s): Elizabeth Garrett Anderson; James Anderson
- Relatives: Louisa Garrett Anderson (sister)
- Education: Eton (1890 & 1895); Trinity College, Oxford (1896)
- Occupation: Civil servant, shipowner

Sir Alan Garrett Anderson (9 March 1877 – 4 May 1952) was a British civil servant, politician and shipowner.

== Early life and career ==
Anderson was born in 1877 to James George Skelton Anderson and Elizabeth Garrett Anderson. Anderson's father was a shipping magnate who merged the family shipping business, Anderson, Anderson & Co., with Frederick Green & Co. on 12 February 1878 to create the Orient Steam Navigation Company. Anderson's mother was the first British woman in England to qualify as a doctor. He was one of three children born to the couple. One of his sisters, Louisa Garrett Anderson, followed in her mother's footsteps and became a doctor herself, serving during World War I as the head of a military hospital, while Anderson joined his father in the family's shipping enterprise in 1897. Prior to joining the company, Anderson was educated at Eton College (1890 and 1895) and Trinity College, Oxford (1896). Once established in the shipping industry, Anderson expanded into the related field of rail transport, becoming director of Midland Railway in 1911, a seat he maintained through the merger of that railway in 1923 into London, Midland & Scottish Railway.

== First World War ==
Anderson utilised his business experiences internationally in service of the government during the First World War. Appointed vice-chairman of the Royal Commission responsible for regulating the distribution of wheat supplies, he dealt generally with Great Britain's western allies. He dealt specifically with the United States first in processing enemy cargo aboard US vessels under Walter Runciman and, after the US entered the war, in marketing wheat in the United States as well as Canada along with Arthur Balfour.

In the summer of 1917, Anderson was appointed to replace Eric Geddes as Admiralty controller, a position that made him one of the Lords Commissioners of the Admiralty. During Geddes' term, the Controller had been put in charge of overseeing construction and repairs of both the Royal and Merchant navies, which were taking a toll from submarine attacks. Geddes had set very high quotas for production that the Controller's office, even with delegation, was unable to meet both from shortage of materials and manpower. Tensions were high on both sides, with Joseph Davies specifying his irritation with Anderson, while Anderson, in response to one notable shortage of shipbuilders in November 1917, chided the military for "a complete lack of sense of proportion", suggesting that recruitment would be more successfully accomplished by appealing to wives and union officials in towns known for shipbuilding than seeking the Home Office. Anderson resigned from the position in 1918.

In spite of these challenges, Anderson was widely honoured. In 1917, he was appointed a Knight Commander of the Order of the British Empire (KBE), an Officer of the Légion d'honneur, and an Officer of the Order of the Crown of Italy in reward for his wartime services.

== Post-war career ==
After the war, Anderson continued to broaden his career. He became known as a powerful figure in the world of finance. Though inexperienced in banking, he became involved with the Bank of England, serving on its board from 1918 to 1946, and serving as its deputy governor under Sir Montagu Norman from 1925 to 1926. Prior to assuming the latter role, as deputy governor-elect, Anderson accompanied Norman in December 1924 to New York to help determine the feasibility of a resumption of the gold standard. He spoke at the International Chamber of Commerce congress in 1927 as acting president, giving an "eloquent" speech on tariff reductions. From 1927 until 1952, he was a board member of the Suez Canal Company.

His shipping concerns, too, broadened. From its formation in 1878, the Orient Steam Navigation Company had been operated under the co-management of Anderson, Anderson & Co. and Frederick Green & Co, but in 1919 a controlling interest in the Orient Steam Navigation Company was purchased by P&O. At that time, Anderson, Anderson and Co. was merged with F. Green and Co. into Anderson, Green & Co., and Anderson was made a board member of both P&O and the British-India Steam Navigation Company by James Mackay, 1st Earl of Inchcape.

In addition, Anderson continued public service. According to his Oxford Dictionary of National Biography entry, "he chaired two government inquiries, one on the training of naval officers, the other on the pay of civil servants, and was a member of the royal commission into national debt." He was involved with the hospital named in honour of his mother, being shown as one of the owners of the freehold in May 1923, and remained active in the London School of Medicine for Women and the Royal Free Hospital which his mother had helped found.

Anderson was granted an honorary commission as a captain in the Royal Naval Reserve on 28 June 1930. He was promoted to Knight Grand Cross of the Order of the British Empire (GBE) in the 1934 Birthday Honours.

== Member of Parliament and Second World War ==
In 1935, Anderson ran for public office as a Conservative candidate to represent the City of London as a Member of Parliament (MP). He was first elected at a by-election in June 1935 and was re-elected in that year's general election in November. He resigned in 1940 and focused his efforts on helping his country through World War II. The British Ministry of Food had established a Cereals Control Board following the Munich Crisis in 1938 and placed Anderson to serve as its chairman. In August 1941, he became the Controller of Railways and the chairman of the Railway Executive. He served as Honorary Colonel of a Territorial Army unit of the Gloucestershire Regiment for a period up to 27 September 1949, retaining the honorary rank of colonel afterwards.

== Personal life ==
On 9 June 1903, Anderson wed Muriel Ivy Duncan of Surrey. They had four children, including Donald Forsyth Anderson and Colin Skelton Anderson who followed their father into the shipping industry. He died on 4 May 1952.

== Sources ==
- Harcourt, Freda (January 2008) [2004]. "Anderson, Sir Alan Garrett (1877–1952)". Oxford Dictionary of National Biography (online ed.). Oxford University Press. doi:10.1093/ref:odnb/30404. (Subscription, Wikipedia Library access or UK public library membership required.)
- Moggridge, D.E. (23 March 1972). British Monetary Policy 1924 – 1931. University of Cambridge, Department of Applied Economics. ISBN 978-0-521-08225-9.
- Turner, John (1980). Lloyd George's Secretariat. CUP Archive. ISBN 0-521-22370-9.

Military offices
Preceded by Sir Eric Geddes	Controller of the Navy; 1917–1918	Succeeded by Sir Charles de Bartolomé
Honorary titles
Preceded by Algernon Osmond Miles	High Sheriff of the County of London; 1922–1923	Succeeded by Walter Kennedy Whigham
Parliament of the United Kingdom
Preceded by Edward Grenfell; Sir Vansittart Bowater, Bt.	Member of Parliament for the City of London; 1935–1940; With: Sir Thomas Vansittart Bowater, Bt. 1935–1938; Sir George Broadbridge, Bt 1938–1945	Succeeded by Sir George Broadbridge, Bt; Andrew Duncan
