= 1904 City of London by-election =

UK parliamentary by-election

The 1904 City of London by-election was a parliamentary by-election held in England on 9 February 1904 for the UK House of Commons constituency of City of London.

The by-election was triggered by the disqualification of the sitting Conservative Party Member of Parliament (MP), Hon. Alban Gibbs. The 57-year-old Gibbs was re-elected unopposed.

== Vacancy ==
Gibbs had been an MP for the City of London since the 1892 general election, when he was elected to succeed his father Hucks Gibbs.

Alban Gibbs and his brother Vicary (MP for St Albans) were partners in the family business Antony Gibbs & Sons. This firm had organised the sale to the Admiralty of the two Swiftsure-class battleships, Triumph and Swiftsure, which had been constructed in England for the Chilean Navy. Financial difficulties prevented Chile from completing the purchase, and they were bought for the Royal Navy to prevent them from being purchased by Russia, which had made a cash offer for them. Vicary Gibbs told his constituents that if the ships had passed into the hands of a rival nation, the balance of power would have been significantly altered, and that Britain would have fallen behind in naval power relative to its rivals.

However, in organising the sale, the two brothers had disqualified themselves from sitting in the House of Commons, under the terms of the House of Commons (Disqualification) Act 1782 (22 Geo. 3. c. 45) which debarred MPs from accepting contracts from the Crown. Vicary Gibbs told his constituents on 18 January that he would resign from the Commons by taking the Chiltern Hundreds, and then present himself for re-election. On 26 January Alban Gibbs told the City of London Conservative Association that his seat would become vacant on the first day of the new session of Parliament, but he was unsure whether this would happen through taking the Chiltern Hundreds, or by some other means. The Association's chairman, Sir John Puleston, moved a vote of thanks to Gibbs for rendering such a "patriotic service" to the country.

== Writ ==
When Parliament reassembled, neither of the Gibbs brothers applied for the Chiltern Hundreds. Instead they both wrote to the Speaker on 1 February to inform him of the contract. Their letters were read to the Commons on 2 February, and the writs were moved the following day. The writ for the City of London was opposed by the South Donegal MP J. G. Swift MacNeill, who moved an amendment to establish a Select committee to investigate whether the two MPs were actually disqualified. This, he said, was the procedure followed in relation to Baron Rothschild in 1845, and of Sir Sydney Waterlow in 1869; in each case the Speaker had suspended the Motion for the Writ until the question had been considered by the committee. The Speaker disputed MacNeill's assessment, but when MacNeill sustained his objection, the writ was adjourned for debate on the following day. MacNeill similarly objected to the writ for St Albans, and debate on it was also adjourned.

Debate resumed on 3 February, when MacNeill submitted that the Gibbs brothers were brokers, and should not necessarily be deemed to be contractors. He believed that it was for the House itself to decide whether the brothers were contractors within the meaning of the Act. This view was opposed by the Home Secretary, Aretas Akers-Douglas, who argued that there was a crucial distinction. Akers-Douglas pointed out that in the previous cases the members concerned had opposed disqualification and wanted to defend the right to retain their seats, whereas the Gibbs brothers wanted to vacate their seats and defend them in by-elections. He argued that the two men had acted in good faith, and that it would be wrong to leave the constituencies unrepresented while the question was decided.

The amendment was put and defeated. The writs were then issued for both the City of London and St Albans by-elections.

== Nominations ==
After notifying the Speaker of his disqualification, Gibbs published a brief address "to the electors of the City of London", which was published as an advertisement in The Times newspaper on 3 February. He told voters that having been obliged to vacate his seat, he intended to offer himself for re-election. Gibbs stated that his "views on political matters are so well known to you that it is unnecessary for me to dwell on them here", but he did venture a cautious comment on the then-current controversy between free trade and protectionism. He pledged his support for the Prime Minister Arthur Balfour on fiscal policy, but professed "the greatest sympathy for the Imperial Policy by which Mr Chamberlain proposes to bind the Empire together". By contrast, his brother Vicary was less equivocal, telling voters in St Albans that if re-elected he would support Chamberlain's proposals

The nominations day was set as Tuesday 9 February, with polling to be on Saturday 13 February if the seat was contested. However, The Times reported that there was "no probability of a contest", and when the returning officers received nominations at the Guildhall on 9 February Gibbs was indeed unopposed. His election was announced from the Guildhall at 1pm.

His brother was not so lucky. Vicary Gibbs faced a strong campaign from his Liberal opponent at the St Albans by-election, and was narrowly defeated.

== Aftermath ==
Two years later, at the general election in January 1906, Gibbs was one of two Conservatives re-elected for the City of London with a large majority over their Liberal opponents. However, the outgoing Prime Minister Arthur Balfour had been defeated in his Manchester East. After consulting with leading Conservatives in the City of London, Gibbs wrote to Balfour on 24 January offering to resign his safe seat to allow Balfour to stand, and the following day Balfour sent a telegram accepting the offer. Gibbs resigned from the Commons on 14 February by the procedural device of appointment as Steward of the Manor of Northstead. At the resulting by-election on 26 February, Balfour was returned with 78.9% of the votes. In September 1907, Gibbs succeeded his father as Baron Aldenham, and took his seat in the House of Lords.

== See also ==
- Lists of United Kingdom by-elections
- 1904 St Albans by-election
