= Eric Broadbridge, 2nd Baron Broadbridge =

The Right Honourable The Lord Broadbridge
- Baron Broadbridge in 1957
- Born: 22 December 1895
- Died: 18 November 1972 (aged 76)
- Occupations: Hereditary peer and businessman

Eric Wilberforce Broadbridge, 2nd Baron Broadbridge (22 December 1895 – 18 November 1972), was a hereditary peer and businessman.

== Background ==
He was born in 1895, the son of George Broadbridge, 1st Baron Broadbridge, and Fanny Kathleen Brigden. He married Mabel Daisy Clarke, the daughter of Arthur Edward Clarke. He succeeded to the title of Baron Broadbridge, of Brighton, co. Sussex (U.K., 1945), in April 1952.

== Education ==
Broadbridge was educated at Hurstpierpoint College. He fought in the First World War, in the Machine Gun Corps.

== Arms ==
Coat of arms of Eric Broadbridge, 2nd Baron Broadbridge
Crest A dolphin hauriant Argent between two gilly-flowers Gules slipped and leaved Vert. Escutcheon Gules in chief two pens in saltire and in base over water a stone bridge of a single span embattled Proper. Supporters On either side a dolphin Proper charged with a sword erect Gules. Motto Industria Et Perseverantia (By Industry & Perseverance)

Peerage of the United Kingdom
Preceded by George Broadbridge	Baron Broadbridge; 1952–1972	Succeeded by Peter Broadbridge
Baronetage of the United Kingdom
Preceded by George Broadbridge	Baronet of Wargrave Place; 1952–1972	Succeeded by Peter Broadbridge
