= Baron Banbury of Southam =

Barony in the Peerage of the United Kingdom

Arms of Baron Banbury of Southam: Ermine, a cross patée gules between five mullets of six points each within an annulet, three in chief and two in base, all of the last

Baron Banbury of Southam, in the County of Warwick, is a title in the Peerage of the United Kingdom. It was created in 1924 for the businessman and Conservative politician Sir Frederick Banbury, 1st Baronet. He was head of Frederick Banbury and Sons, stockbrokers, and also represented Peckham and the City of London in the House of Commons. Banbury had already been created a baronet, of Southam in the County of Warwick, on 6 January 1903. As of 2026, the titles are held by his great-grandson, the third Baron, who succeeded his father in 1981.

== Barons Banbury (1924) ==
- Frederick George Banbury, 1st Baron Banbury of Southam (1850–1936)
  - Charles William Banbury (1877–1914)
- Charles William Banbury, 2nd Baron Banbury of Southam (1915–1981)
- Charles William Banbury, 3rd Baron Banbury of Southam (born 1953)

There is no heir to the titles.

== Notes ==
Baronetage of the United Kingdom
Preceded by Brown baronets	Banbury baronets of Southam; 6 January 1903	Succeeded by Renshaw baronets
