= Edward Grenfell, 1st Baron St Just =

British banker and politician (1870–1941)

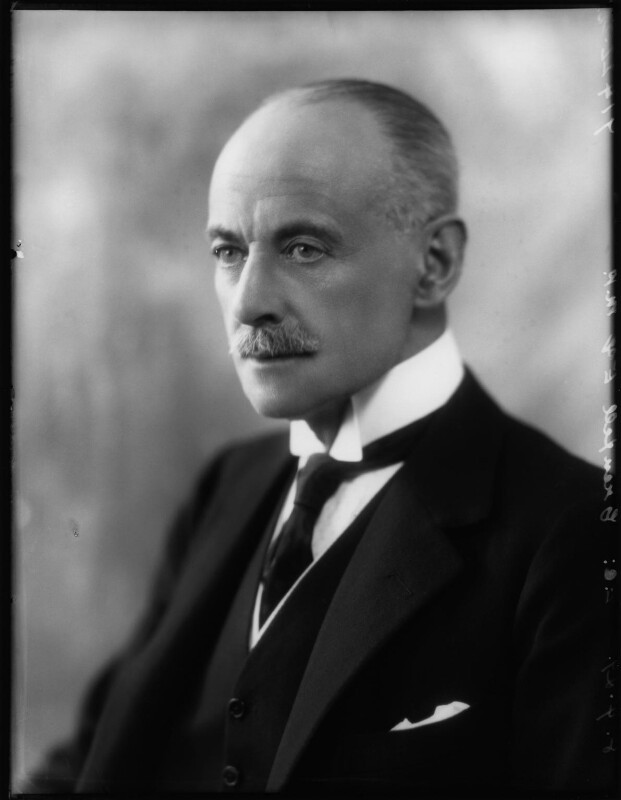
Grenfell in 1929

Edward Charles Grenfell, 1st Baron St Just (29 May 1870 – 26 November 1941), was a British banker and politician.

His father, Henry Riversdale Grenfell, was Governor of the Bank of England between 1881 and 1883. William Grenfell, 1st Baron Desborough, was his first cousin.

He was educated at Harrow School and Trinity College, Cambridge, where he was secretary of the Pitt Club. On graduation, he immediately entered a career in banking with a position in Brown Shipley, and subsequently with Smith Ellison, moving to J. S. Morgan & Co. in 1900. In 1904, Grenfell became a partner in the bank and in 1910, when J. P. Morgan restructured his London bank, it was renamed Morgan, Grenfell & Co. to reflect his position as senior partner. He was a director of the Bank of England from 1905 to 1940.

Grenfell married Florence Emily Henderson in 1913. In May 1922, he was elected a Unionist Member of Parliament for the City of London in a by-election and held the seat until 1935, when he was raised to the peerage as Baron St Just, of St Just in Penwith in the County of Cornwall. This led to the 1935 City of London by-election, at which there was no contest. Lord St Just died on 26 November 1941, aged 71, and was succeeded in the barony by his only child Peter George Grenfell (1922–1984).

== Bibliography ==
- at Grenfell Family History Site
- Leigh Rayment's Peerage Pages
- Leigh Rayment's Historical List of MPs

Parliament of the United Kingdom
Preceded by Sir Frederick Banbury, Bt; Arthur Balfour	Member of Parliament for City of London; 1922–1935; With: Sir Frederick Banbury, Bt 1922–1924; Sir Vansittart Bowater, Bt 1924–1935	Succeeded by Sir Vansittart Bowater, Bt; Sir Alan Anderson
Peerage of the United Kingdom
New creation	Baron St Just; 1935–1941	Succeeded by Peter George Grenfell
