= Frederick Banbury, 1st Baron Banbury of Southam =

British politician

The Right Honourable The Lord Banbury of Southam PC
- Banbury in 1895

Member of Parliament for Peckham
- In office 1892–1906
- Preceded by: Arthur Anthony Baumann
- Succeeded by: Charles Clarke

Member of Parliament for City of London
- In office 1906–1924
- Preceded by: Sir Edward Clarke
- Succeeded by: Vansittart Bowater

Personal details
- Born: 2 December 1850
- Died: 13 August 1936 (aged 85) Sevenhampton, Wiltshire, England
- Spouse: Elizabeth Rosa Beale
- Parent(s): Frederick Banbury; Cecilia Laura Cox
- Education: Winchester College
- Occupation: Aristocrat, businessman, politician

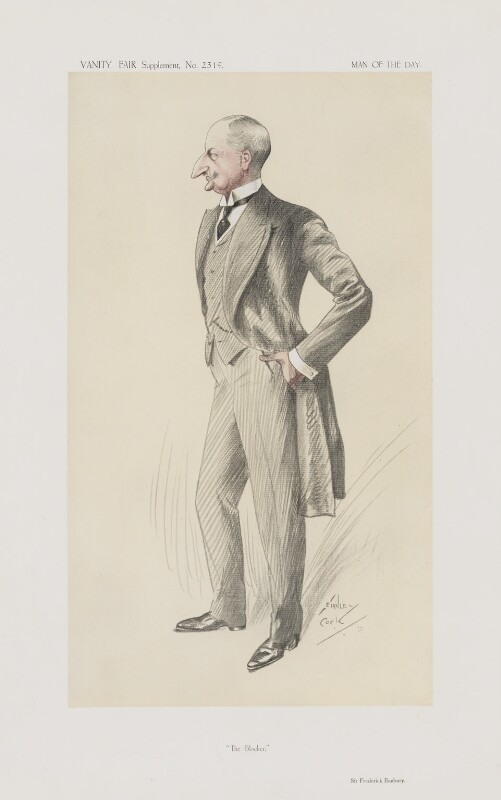
"The Blocker", caricature by Eianley Cock in Vanity Fair, 1913

Frederick George Banbury, 1st Baron Banbury of Southam PC (2 December 1850 – 13 August 1936), known as Sir Frederick Banbury, 1st Baronet from 1903 to 1924, was a British businessman and Conservative Member of Parliament.

== Early life ==
Frederick Banbury was born on 2 December 1850. He was the eldest son of Frederick Banbury and Cecilia Laura (née Cox) of Shirley House, Surrey. He was educated at Winchester College.

== Business career ==
Banbury was admitted to the London Stock Exchange in 1872 and was head of Frederick Banbury and Sons, stockbrokers, of London, between 1879 and 1906, as well as chairman of the Great Northern Railway (GNR) and a director of the London and Provincial Bank.

== Politics ==
Banbury was elected to represent Camberwell, Peckham in the House of Commons at the 1892 general election, and held the seat in 1895 and 1900. At the 1906 general election he lost the seat as the Liberal Party won a large majority. Later in the year he returned to parliament when he was returned unopposed in a by-election for the City of London. He held the seat until 1924.

He was a diligent member of the Commons, and was known for his formal attire and punctuality. Although he remained on the back benches he was regarded as an institution in the House. Banbury was created a baronet, "of Southam in the County of Warwick", in 1903, and admitted to the Privy Council in 1916. When the bill which led to the initial extension of the franchise to women was passing through parliament, Banbury said during a debate:

"Women are likely to be affected by gusts and waves of sentiment. Their emotional temperament makes them so liable to it. But those are not the people best fitted in this practical world either to sit in this House ... or to be entrusted with the immense power which this bill gives them."

During World War I, Banbury headed the Unionist War Committee with Ronald McNeill. This was an organisation that campaigned for "vigorous prosecution of the war."

In May 1916, the British government announced it was introducing daylight saving time in the country. Banbury spoke out against the planned change in Parliament. Banbury called the proposed law "grandmotherly legislation". Banbury pointed out that daylight saving time had initially been adopted by the German Empire. Banbury then stated: "If the Germans have done it, it is a very good reason why we should not do it." Despite Banbury's opposition, the new law was passed in Parliament.

In March 1922, Banbury was one of several Conservative politicians who signed the "Diehard Manifesto" circulated by the journalist H. A. Gwynne and later published in The Times. This Manifesto pledged to protect Laissez-faire capitalism in the United Kingdom.

During the Parliamentary debate on the Intoxicating Liquor (Sale to Persons under 18) Bill (which would raise the legal age for consuming alcohol in a public house from 14 to 18), Banbury spoke against the legislation. One of Banbury's arguments against the bill was that he himself had drunk beer as a child. This raised cries from other MPs of "Look at the result!"

After his retirement from the House of Commons in January 1924, he was raised to the peerage as Baron Banbury of Southam, of Southam in the County of Warwick.

== Railways ==
He was the last chairman of the Great Northern Railway (GNR), which lost its identity when, under the Railways Act 1921, it was grouped with several other railways on 1 January 1923 to become a constituent of the London & North Eastern Railway (LNER). Sir Frederick was a strong opponent of the railway grouping, and had voted against the bill during its passage through Parliament; he wanted no part of the future LNER, and decided to retire from his railway positions at the end of 1922. In late September 1922, the GNR honoured Sir Frederick by naming its newest express passenger locomotive no. 1471 Sir Frederick Banbury. This locomotive belonged to GNR Class A1, was built in July 1922 and remained in service until November 1961.

== Personal life ==
Banbury married Elizabeth Rosa, daughter of Thomas Barbot Beale, of Brettenham, Suffolk in 1873. She died in 1930. Banbury survived her by six years and died in August 1936 at his home, Warneford Place, Sevenhampton, near Highworth in Wiltshire, aged 85. He was buried at Sevenhampton parish church. He was succeeded in the barony by his grandson Charles, his only son Captain Charles William Banbury having been killed in the First World War.

Banbury was an animal lover, and for many years was on the council of the Royal Society for the Prevention of Cruelty to Animals, and served as its chairman.

== Sources ==
- Kidd, Charles, Williamson, David (editors). Debrett's Peerage and Baronetage (1990 edition). New York: St Martin's Press, 1990,
- Leigh Rayment's Peerage Pages
- Leigh Rayment's Historical List of MPs

Parliament of the United Kingdom
Preceded by Arthur Baumann	Member of Parliament for Peckham; 1892 – 1906	Succeeded by Charles Clarke
Preceded by Edward Clarke; Arthur Balfour	Member of Parliament for the City of London; 1906 – 1924; With: Arthur Balfour 1906–1922; Edward Grenfell 1922–1924	Succeeded by Edward Grenfell; Vansittart Bowater
Baronetage of the United Kingdom
New creation	Baronet (of Southam); 1903 – 1936	Succeeded by Charles Banbury
Peerage of the United Kingdom
New creation	Baron Banbury of Southam; 1924 – 1936	Succeeded by Charles Banbury
