= Arthur Balfour =

Prime Minister of the United Kingdom from 1902 to 1905

The Right Honourable The Earl of Balfour KG OM PC DL FRS FBA
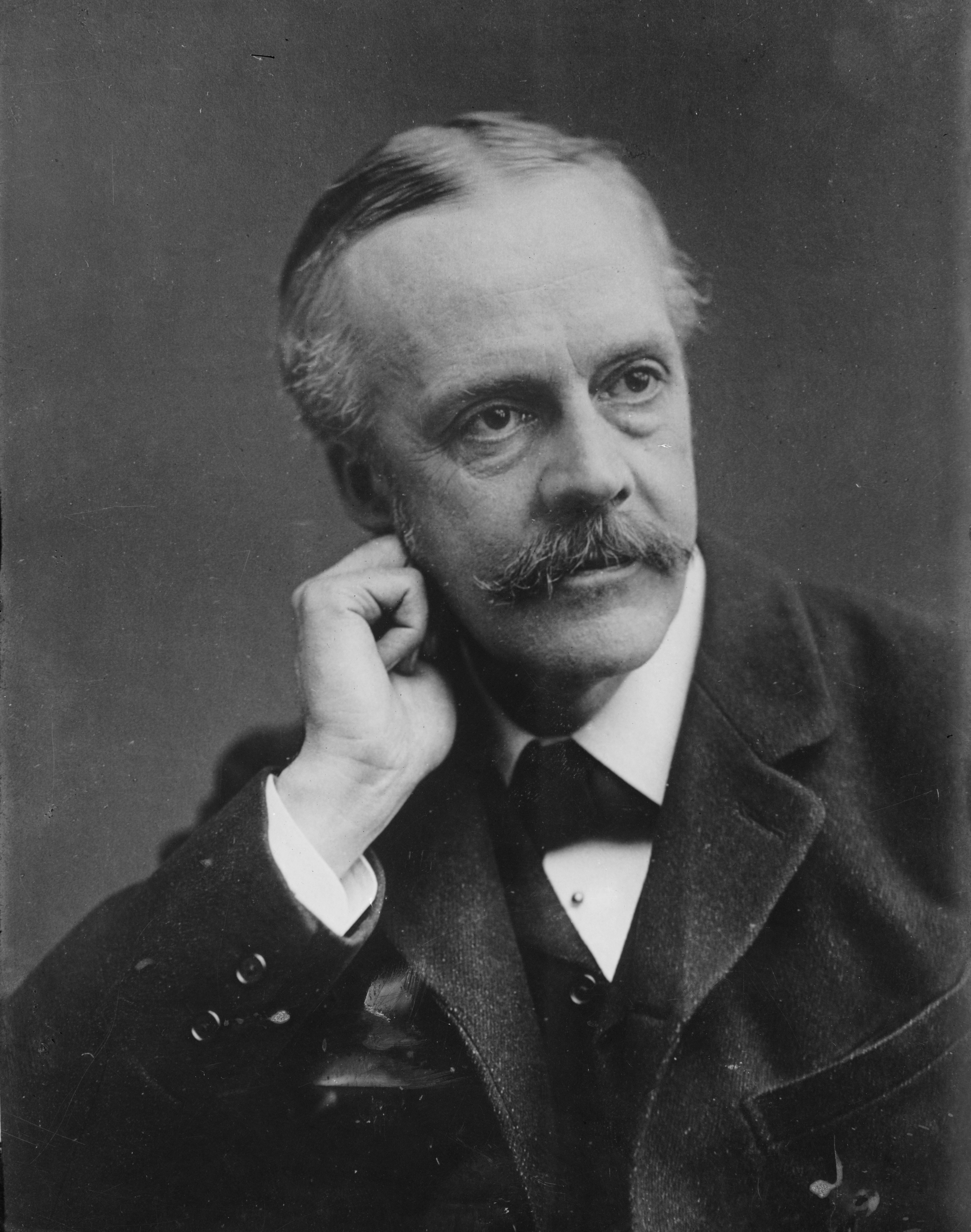
- Balfour c. 1900s

Prime Minister of the United Kingdom
- In office 12 July 1902 – 4 December 1905
- Monarch: Edward VII
- Preceded by: The Marquess of Salisbury
- Succeeded by: Henry Campbell-Bannerman
Senior political offices
Leader of the Opposition
In office 27 February 1906 – 13 November 1911
| Monarchs | Edward VII; George V |
| Prime Minister | Henry Campbell-Bannerman; H. H. Asquith |
| Preceded by | Joseph Chamberlain (Commons Leader) |
| Succeeded by | Bonar Law |
In office 5 December 1905 – 8 February 1906
| Monarch | Edward VII |
| Prime Minister | Henry Campbell-Bannerman |
| Preceded by | Henry Campbell-Bannerman |
| Succeeded by | Joseph Chamberlain (Commons Leader) |
Leader of the Conservative Party
In office 11 July 1902 – 13 November 1911
| Preceded by | The Marquess of Salisbury |
| Succeeded by | Bonar Law |
Ministerial offices 1915‍–‍1929
Lord President of the Council
In office 27 April 1925 – 4 June 1929
| Prime Minister | Stanley Baldwin |
| Preceded by | The Marquess Curzon of Kedleston |
| Succeeded by | The Lord Parmoor |
In office 23 October 1919 – 19 October 1922
| Prime Minister | David Lloyd George |
| Preceded by | The Earl Curzon of Kedleston |
| Succeeded by | The 4th Marquess of Salisbury |
Foreign Secretary
In office 10 December 1916 – 23 October 1919
| Prime Minister | David Lloyd George |
| Preceded by | The Viscount Grey of Fallodon |
| Succeeded by | The Earl Curzon of Kedleston |
First Lord of the Admiralty
In office 25 May 1915 – 10 December 1916
| Prime Minister | H. H. Asquith; David Lloyd George |
| Preceded by | Winston Churchill |
| Succeeded by | Edward Carson |
1885‍–‍1903
Lord Keeper of the Privy Seal
In office 11 July 1902 – 17 October 1903
| Prime Minister | The 3rd Marquess of Salisbury |
| Preceded by | The 3rd Marquess of Salisbury |
| Succeeded by | The 4th Marquess of Salisbury |
First Lord of the Treasury
In office 25 June 1895 – 5 December 1905
| Prime Minister | The 3rd Marquess of Salisbury; Himself |
| Preceded by | The Earl of Rosebery |
| Succeeded by | Henry Campbell-Bannerman |
In office 6 October 1891 – 15 August 1892
| Prime Minister | The 3rd Marquess of Salisbury |
| Preceded by | William Henry Smith |
| Succeeded by | William Ewart Gladstone |
Chief Secretary for Ireland
In office 7 March 1887 – 9 November 1891
| Prime Minister | The 3rd Marquess of Salisbury |
| Preceded by | Michael Hicks Beach |
| Succeeded by | William Jackson |
Secretary for Scotland
In office 5 August 1886 – 11 March 1887
| Prime Minister | The 3rd Marquess of Salisbury |
| Preceded by | The Earl of Dalhousie |
| Succeeded by | The Marquess of Lothian |
President of the Local Government Board
In office 24 June 1885 – 1 February 1886
| Prime Minister | The 3rd Marquess of Salisbury |
| Preceded by | Charles Dilke |
| Succeeded by | Joseph Chamberlain |
Parliamentary offices
Member of the House of Lords
Lord Temporal
Hereditary peerage 5 May 1922 – 19 March 1930
| Preceded by | Peerage created |
| Succeeded by | The 2nd Earl of Balfour |

Member of Parliament
- In office 17 February 1874 – 5 May 1922
- Preceded by: Robert Dimsdale
- Succeeded by: Edward Grenfell
- Constituency: Hertford (1874–1885); Manchester East (1885–1906); City of London (1906–1922)

Personal details
- Born: Arthur James Balfour; 25 July 1848 Whittingehame, East Lothian, Scotland
- Died: 19 March 1930 (aged 81) Woking, Surrey, England
- Resting place: Whittingehame Church, Whittingehame
- Party: Conservative
- Parents: James Maitland Balfour (father); Blanche Gascoyne-Cecil (mother)
- Education: Trinity College, Cambridge

Arthur James Balfour, 1st Earl of Balfour (/ˈbælfər, -fɔːr/; 25 July 1848 – 19 March 1930), was a British Conservative statesman who served as Prime Minister of the United Kingdom from 1902 to 1905. He also later served as foreign secretary in the Lloyd George ministry, from 1916 to 1919.

Balfour trained as a philosopher – he originated an argument against believing that human reason could determine truth – and was seen as having a detached attitude to life. Entering Parliament in 1874, Balfour achieved prominence as Chief Secretary for Ireland, in which position he suppressed agrarian unrest whilst taking measures against absentee landlords. He opposed Irish Home Rule, saying there could be no half-way house between Ireland remaining within the United Kingdom or becoming independent. From 1891 he led the Conservative Party in the House of Commons, serving under his uncle, Lord Salisbury, whose government won large majorities in 1895 and 1900. An esteemed debater, he was bored by the mundane tasks of party management.

In July 1902, he succeeded his uncle as prime minister. In domestic policy he passed the Land Purchase (Ireland) Act 1903, which bought out most of the Anglo-Irish landowners. The Education Act 1902 had a major long-term impact in modernising the school system in England and Wales and provided financial support for schools operated by the Church of England and by the Catholic Church. Nonconformists were outraged and mobilised their voters, but were unable to reverse it. In foreign and defence policy, he oversaw reform of British defence policy and supported Jackie Fisher's naval innovations. He secured the Entente Cordiale with France, an agreement that paved the way for improved relations between the two states. He cautiously embraced imperial preference as championed by Joseph Chamberlain, but resignations from the Cabinet over the abandonment of free trade left his party divided. He also suffered from public anger at the later stages of the Boer War (counter-insurgency warfare characterised as "methods of barbarism") and the importation of Chinese labour to South Africa ("Chinese slavery"). He resigned as prime minister in December 1905 and the following month the Conservatives suffered a landslide defeat at the 1906 election, in which he lost his own seat. He soon re-entered Parliament and continued to serve as Leader of the Opposition throughout the crisis over Lloyd George's 1909 budget, the narrow loss of two further General Elections in 1910, and the passage of the Parliament Act 1911. He resigned as party leader in 1911.

Balfour returned as First Lord of the Admiralty in Asquith's Coalition Government (1915–1916). In December 1916, he became foreign secretary in David Lloyd George's coalition. He was frequently left out of the inner workings of foreign policy, although the Balfour Declaration of 1917 issued on behalf of the cabinet, which supported a "home for the Jewish people" in Palestine, bore his name. Balfour continued to serve in senior positions throughout the 1920s, included Lord President of the Council, during which he issued the Balfour Declaration of 1926, announcing a co-equal relationship between the United Kingdom and its Dominions, thus laying the groundwork for the Statute of Westminster 1931 which granted full independence to the former colonies. Balfour died in 1930, aged 81, having spent a vast inherited fortune. He never married.

== Background and early life ==
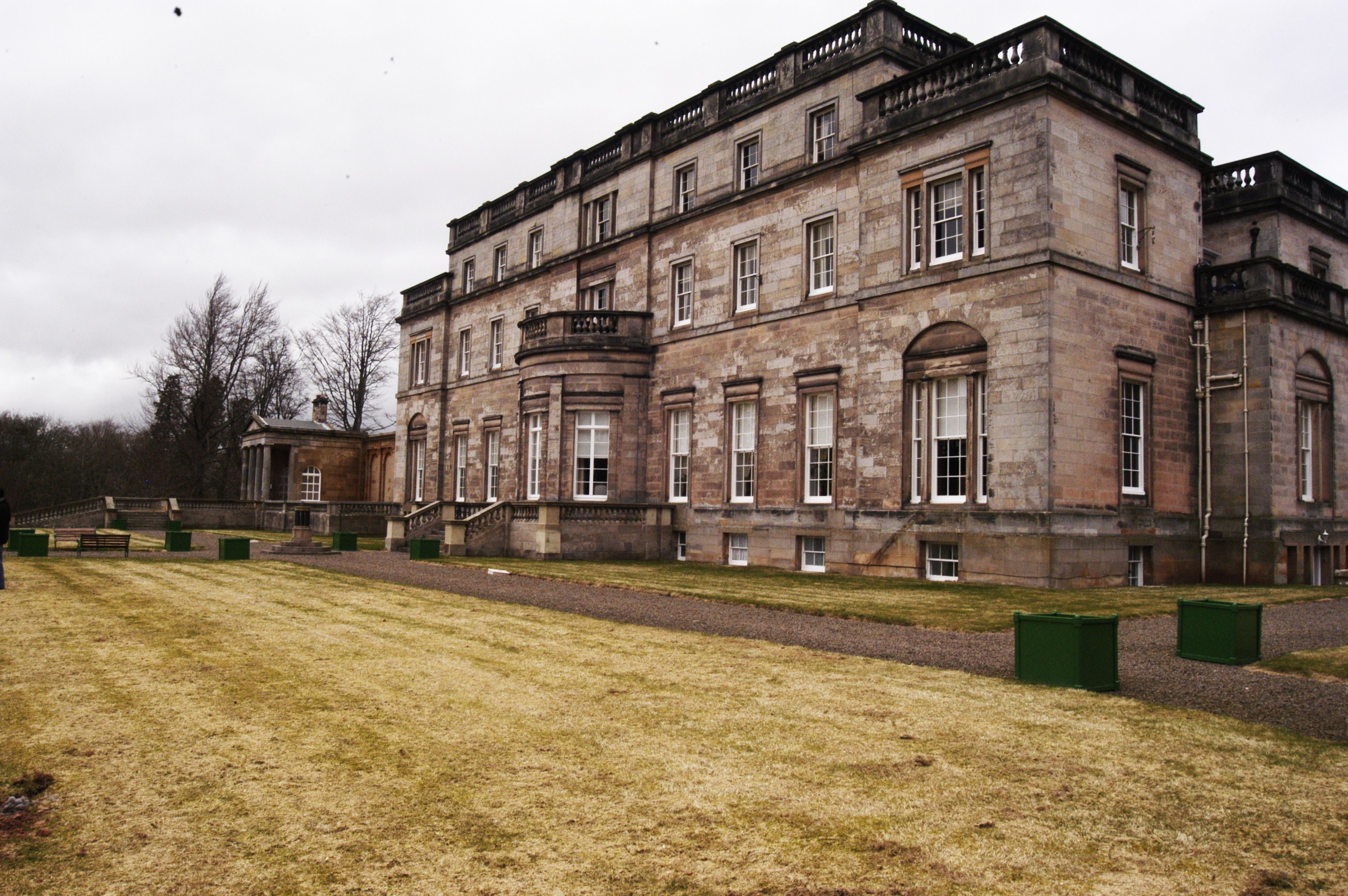
Whittingehame House

Arthur James Balfour was born on 25 July 1848 at Whittingehame House, East Lothian, Scotland, the eldest son of James Maitland Balfour and Lady Blanche Gascoyne-Cecil.

The name of Balfour is an ancient one in Scotland which was probably derived from a settlement near Markinch in Fife.

His father was a Scottish MP, as was his grandfather James; his mother, a member of the Cecil family descended from Robert Cecil, 1st Earl of Salisbury, was the daughter of the 2nd Marquess of Salisbury and his first wife, Mary Frances Gascoyne (born 1802; m. 1821; died 1839), and she was a sister of the 3rd Marquess, the future prime minister. Arthur's godfather was the Duke of Wellington, after whom he was named. He was the eldest son, third of eight children, and had four brothers and three sisters: His elder sisters Eleanor and Evelyn, his younger siblings Cecil, Alice, Francis Maitland Balfour (later a Cambridge embryologist), Gerald (who also became a politician) and then his youngest brother Eustace, who became an architect. Arthur Balfour was educated at Grange Preparatory School at Hoddesdon, Hertfordshire (1859–1861), and Eton College (1861–1866), where he studied with the influential master, William Johnson Cory. He then went up to the University of Cambridge, where he read moral sciences at Trinity College (1866–1869).

== Personal life ==
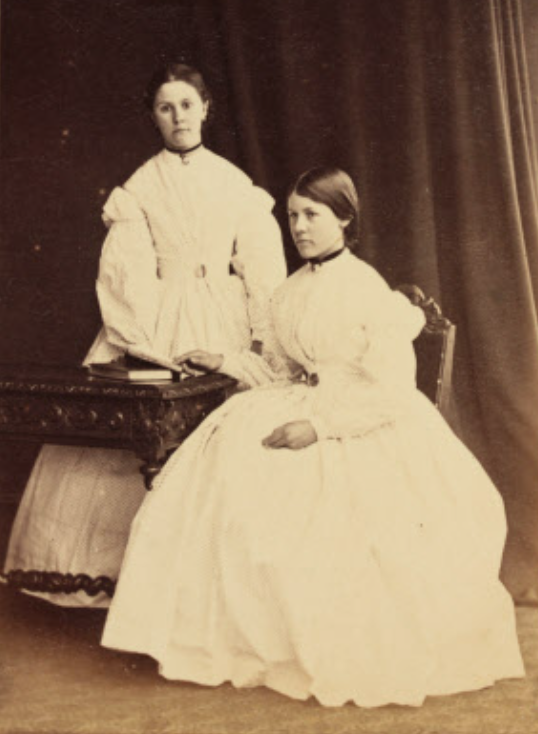
Lavinia and "May" Lyttleton

Balfour met May Lyttelton in 1870 when she was 19. After her two previous serious suitors had died, Balfour is said to have declared his love for her in December 1874. She died of typhus on Palm Sunday, 21 March 1875; Balfour arranged for an emerald ring to be buried in her coffin. Lavinia Talbot, May's sister, believed that an engagement had been imminent, but her recollections of Balfour's distress (he was "staggered") were not written down until thirty years later.

Historian R. J. Q. Adams points out that May's letters discuss her love life in detail, but contain no evidence that she was in love with Balfour, nor that he had spoken to her of marriage. He visited her only once during her serious three-month illness, and was soon accepting social invitations again within a month of her death. Adams suggests that, although he may simply have been too shy to express his feelings fully, Balfour may also have encouraged tales of his youthful tragedy as a convenient cover for his disinclination to marry; the matter cannot be conclusively proven.

In later years mediums claimed to pass on messages from her – see the "Cross-Correspondences".

Balfour remained a lifelong bachelor. Margot Tennant (later Margot Asquith) wished to marry him, but Balfour said: "No, that is not so. I rather think of having a career of my own." His household was maintained by his also unmarried sister, Alice. In middle age, Balfour had a 40-year friendship with Mary Charteris (née Wyndham), Lady Elcho, later Countess of Wemyss and March.

Although Adams writes that "it is difficult to say how far the relationship went", her letters suggest they may have become lovers in 1887 and may have engaged in sado-masochism, a claim echoed by A. N. Wilson. Another biographer, Ruddock F. Mackay, believes they had "no direct physical relationship", although he dismisses as "unlikely" suggestions that Balfour was homosexual, or, in view of a time during the Boer War when he was seen as he replied to a message while drying himself after his bath, Lord Beaverbrook's claim that he was "a hermaphrodite" whom no-one saw naked.

Balfour was a leading member of the social and intellectual group The Souls.

== Early career ==
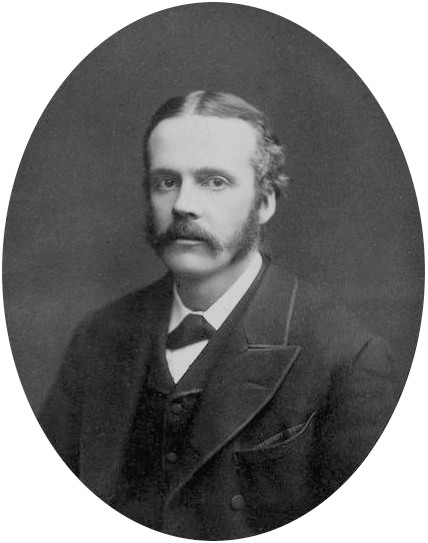
Balfour early in his career

In 1874 Balfour was elected Conservative Member of Parliament (MP) for Hertford until 1885. From 1885 to 1906 he served as the Member of Parliament for Manchester East. In spring 1878, he became private secretary to his uncle Lord Salisbury. He accompanied Salisbury (then Foreign Secretary) to the Congress of Berlin and gained his first experience in international politics in connection with the settlement of the Russo-Turkish conflict. At the same time he became known in the world of letters; the academic subtlety and literary achievement of his Defence of Philosophic Doubt (1879) suggested he might make a reputation as a philosopher.

Nothing matters very much, and few things matter at all.

— Arthur Balfour

Balfour divided his time between politics and academic pursuits. Biographer Sydney Zebel suggested that Balfour continued to appear an amateur or dabbler in public affairs, devoid of ambition and indifferent to policy issues. However, in fact he actually made a dramatic transition to a deeply involved politician. His assets, according to Zebel, included a strong ambition that he kept hidden, shrewd political judgment, a knack for negotiation, a taste for intrigue, and care to avoid factionalism. Most importantly, he deepened his close ties with his uncle Lord Salisbury. He also maintained cordial relationships with Disraeli, Gladstone and other national leaders.

Released from his duties as private secretary by the 1880 general election, he began to take more part in parliamentary affairs. He was for a time politically associated with Lord Randolph Churchill, Sir Henry Drummond Wolff and John Gorst. This quartet became known as the "Fourth Party" and gained notoriety for leader Lord Randolph Churchill's free criticism of Sir Stafford Northcote, Lord Cross and other prominent members of the Conservative "old gang".

== Service in Lord Salisbury's governments ==
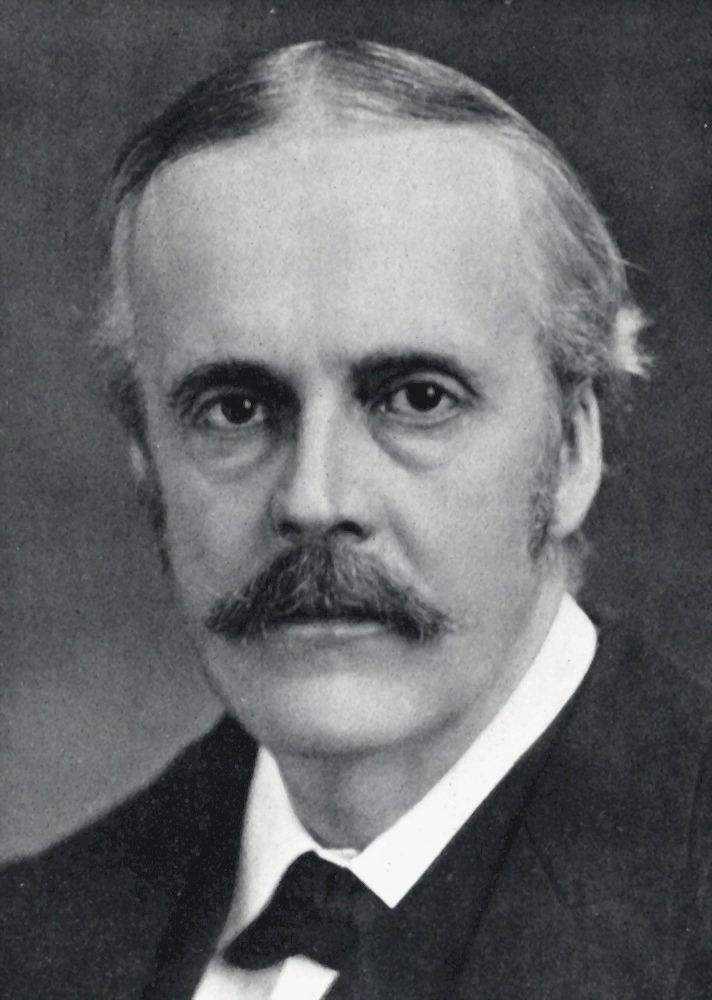
Balfour c. 1890

=== Irish Secretary ===
In 1885, Lord Salisbury appointed Balfour President of the Local Government Board; the following year he became Secretary for Scotland with a seat in the cabinet. These offices, while offering few opportunities for distinction, were an apprenticeship. In early 1887, Sir Michael Hicks Beach, the Chief Secretary for Ireland, resigned because of illness and Salisbury appointed his nephew in his place. The selection was much criticised. It was received with contemptuous ridicule by the Irish Nationalists, for none suspected Balfour's immense strength of will, his debating power, his ability in attack and his still greater capacity to disregard criticism. Balfour surprised critics by ruthless enforcement of the Crimes Act. The Mitchelstown Massacre occurred on 9 September 1887, when Royal Irish Constabulary (RIC) members fired at a crowd protesting against the conviction under the Act of MP William O'Brien and another man. Three were killed by the RIC's gunfire. When Balfour defended the RIC in the Commons, O'Brien dubbed him "Bloody Balfour". His steady administration did much to dispel his reputation as a political lightweight.

In Parliament he resisted overtures to the Irish Parliamentary Party on Home Rule, which he saw as an expression of superficial or false Irish nationalism. Allied with Joseph Chamberlain's Liberal Unionists, he encouraged Unionist activism in Ireland. Balfour also helped the poor by creating the Congested Districts Board for Ireland in 1890. Balfour downplayed the factor of Irish nationalism, arguing that the real issues were economic. Regarding ownership and control of the land, he believed that once violence was suppressed and land was sold to the tenants, Irish nationalism would no longer threaten the unity of the United Kingdom. The slogan "to kill home rule with kindness" characterised Balfour's new policy toward Ireland. The Liberals had begun land sales to Irish tenants with the Land Law (Ireland) Act 1881 and this was expanded by the Conservatives in the land purchase scheme of 1885. However the depression in agriculture kept prices low. Balfour's solution was to keep selling land and in 1887 lowering rents to match the lower prices, and protected more tenants against eviction by their landlords. Balfour greatly expanded the land sales. They culminated in the final Unionist land purchase programme of 1903, when Balfour was prime minister and George Wyndham was the Irish secretary. It encouraged landlords to sell by means of a 12% cash bonus. Tenants were encouraged to buy with a low interest rate, and payments drawn out over 68 years. In 1909, Liberal legislation required compulsory sales in certain cases. As the landlords sold out, they relocated to Great Britain, giving up their political power in Ireland. Tensions in the countryside dramatically declined as some 200,000 peasant proprietors owned about half the land in Ireland. However, the Irish Parliamentary Party recovered after its bitter post-Parnell split was healed and became the dominant political force in Ireland once again, eventually using its position as Westminster kingmaker to secure the passage of a Home Rule Act when the Liberals returned to power. This led in turn to the Home Rule crisis, the formation of the Ulster Volunteers and Irish Volunteers, and a period of growing nationalist and unionist radicalisation that culminated in the Easter rebellion of 1916 and the subsequent War of Independence.

=== Leadership roles ===
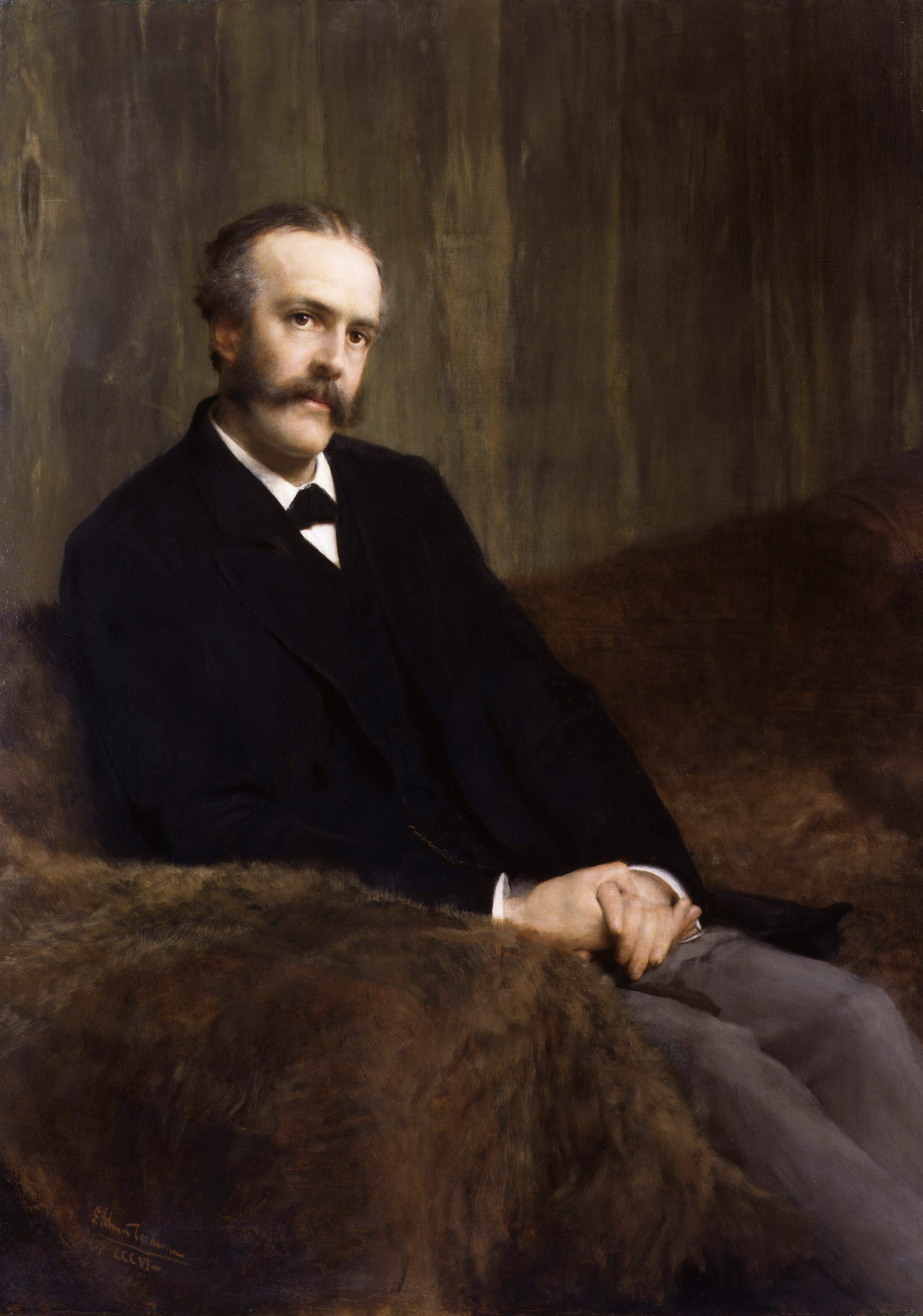
Balfour in 1891, by Lawrence Alma-Tadema

In 1886–1892 he became one of the most effective public speakers of the age. Impressive in matter rather than delivery, his speeches were logical and convincing, and delighted an ever-wider audience.

On the death of W. H. Smith in 1891, Balfour became First Lord of the Treasury – the last in British history not to have been concurrently prime minister as well – and Leader of the House of Commons. After the fall of the government in 1892 he spent three years in opposition. When the Conservatives returned to power, in coalition with the Liberal Unionists, in 1895, Balfour again became Leader of the House and First Lord of the Treasury. His management of the abortive education proposals of 1896 showed a disinclination for the drudgery of parliamentary management, yet he saw the passage of a bill providing Ireland with improved local government under the Local Government (Ireland) Act 1898 and joined in debates on foreign and domestic questions between 1895 and 1900.

During the illness of Lord Salisbury in 1898, and again in Salisbury's absence abroad, Balfour was in charge of the Foreign Office, and he conducted negotiations with Russia on the question of railways in North China. As a member of the cabinet responsible for the Transvaal negotiations in 1899, he bore his share of controversy and, when the Second Boer War began disastrously, he was first to realise the need to use the country's full military strength. His leadership of the House was marked by firmness in the suppression of obstruction, yet there was a slight revival of the criticisms of 1896.

== Premiership (1902–1905) ==
With Lord Salisbury's resignation on 11 July 1902, Balfour succeeded him as prime minister, with the approval of all the Unionist party. The new prime minister came into power practically at the same moment as the coronation of King Edward VII and Queen Alexandra and the end of the South African War. The Liberal party was still disorganised over the Boers.

In foreign affairs, Balfour and his foreign secretary, Lord Lansdowne, improved relations with France, culminating in the Entente Cordiale of 1904. The period also saw the Russo-Japanese War, when Britain, an ally of the Japanese, came close to war with Russia after the Dogger Bank incident. On the whole, Balfour left the conduct of foreign policy to Lansdowne, being busy himself with domestic problems.

Balfour, who had known Zionist leader Chaim Weizmann since 1906, opposed Russian mistreatment of Jews and increasingly supported Zionism as a programme for European Jews to settle in Palestine. However, in 1905 he supported the Aliens Act 1905, one of whose main objectives was to control and restrict Jewish immigration from Eastern Europe.

The budget was certain to show a surplus and taxation could be remitted. Yet as events proved, it was the budget that would sow dissension, override other legislative concerns and signal a new political movement. Charles Thomson Ritchie's remission of the shilling import-duty on corn led to Joseph Chamberlain's crusade in favour of tariff reform. These were taxes on imported goods with trade preference given to the Empire, to protect British industry from competition, strengthen the Empire in the face of growing German and American economic power, and provide revenue, other than raising taxes, for the social welfare legislation. As the session proceeded, the rift grew in the Unionist ranks. Tariff reform was popular with Unionist supporters, but the threat of higher prices for food imports made the policy an electoral albatross. Hoping to split the difference between the free traders and tariff reformers in his cabinet and party, Balfour favoured retaliatory tariffs to punish others who had tariffs against the British, in the hope of encouraging global free trade. This was not sufficient for either the free traders or the extreme tariff reformers in government. With Balfour's agreement, Chamberlain resigned from the Cabinet in late 1903 to campaign for tariff reform. At the same time, Balfour tried to balance the two factions by accepting the resignation of three free-trading ministers, including Chancellor Ritchie, but the almost simultaneous resignation of the free-trader Duke of Devonshire (who as Lord Hartington had been the Liberal Unionist leader of the 1880s) left Balfour's Cabinet weak. By 1905 few Unionist MPs were still free traders (Winston Churchill crossed to the Liberals in 1904 when threatened with deselection at Oldham), but Balfour's act had drained his authority within the government.

Balfour tendered his resignation as prime minister to King Edward, on 4 December 1905, hoping the Liberal leader Campbell-Bannerman would be unable to form a strong government. This was dashed when Campbell-Bannerman faced down an attempt ("The Relugas Compact") to "kick him upstairs" to the House of Lords. The Conservatives were defeated by the Liberals at the general election the following January (in terms of MPs, a Liberal landslide), with Balfour losing his seat at Manchester East to Thomas Gardner Horridge, a solicitor and King's Counsel. Only 156 Conservatives were returned to the Commons, at least two-thirds followers of Chamberlain, who chaired the Conservative MPs until Balfour won a by-election for a safe seat in the City of London.

=== Achievements ===
According to historian Robert Ensor, Balfour can be credited with achievement in five major areas:

1. The Education Act 1902 (and a similar measure for London in 1903);
2. The Land Purchase (Ireland) Act 1903, which bought out the Anglo-Irish landowners;
3. The Licensing Act 1904;
4. In military policy, the creation of the Committee of Imperial Defence (1904) and support for Sir John Fisher's naval reforms.
5. In foreign policy, the Anglo-French Convention (1904), which formed the basis of the Entente Cordiale with France.

The Education Act lasted four decades and eventually was highly praised. Eugene Rasor states, "Balfour was credited and much praised from many perspectives with the success [of the Education Act 1902]. His commitment to education was fundamental and strong." At the time it hurt Balfour because the Liberal party used it to rally their Noncomformist supporters. Ensor said the Act ranked:

among the two or three greatest constructive measures of the twentieth century....[He did not write it] but no statesman less dominated than Balfour was by the concept of national efficiency would have taken it up and carried it through, since its cost on the side of votes was obvious and deterrent....Public money was thus made available for the first time to ensure properly paid teachers and a standardised level of efficiency for all children alike [including the Anglican and Catholic schools].

For most of the 19th century, the very powerful political and economic position of the Church of Ireland (Anglican) landowners opposed the political aspirations of Irish nationalists. Balfour's solution was to buy them out, not by compulsion, but by offering the owners a full immediate payment and a 12% bonus on the sales price. The British government purchased 13 million acres (53,000 km2) by 1920, and sold farms to the tenants at low payments spread over seven decades. It would cost money, but all sides proved amenable. Starting in 1923 the Irish government bought out most of the remaining landowners, and in 1933 diverted payments being made to the British treasury and used them for local improvements.

Balfour's introduction of Chinese coolie labour in South Africa enabled the Liberals to counterattack, charging that his measures amounted to "Chinese slavery". Likewise, Liberals energised the Nonconformists when they attacked Balfour's Licensing Act 1904 which paid pub owners to close down. In the long run it did reduce the great oversupply of pubs, while in the short run Balfour's party was hurt.

Balfour failed to solve his greatest political challenge – the debate over tariffs that ripped his party apart. Chamberlain proposed to turn the Empire into a closed trade bloc protected by high tariffs against imports from Germany and the United States. He argued that tariff reform would revive a flagging British economy, strengthen imperial ties with the dominions and the colonies, and produce a positive programme that would facilitate reelection. He was vehemently opposed by Conservative free traders who denounced the proposal as economically fallacious, and open to the charge of raising food prices in Britain. Balfour tried to forestall disruption by removing key ministers on each side, and offering a much narrower tariff programme. It was ingenious, but both sides rejected any compromise, and his party's chances for reelection were ruined.

Historians generally praised Balfour's achievements in military and foreign policy. Cannon & Crowcroft 2015 stress the importance of the Anglo-French Entente of 1904, and the establishment of the Committee of Imperial Defence. Rasor points to twelve historians who have examined his key role in naval and military reforms. However, there was little political payback at the time. The local Conservative campaigns in 1906 focused mostly on a few domestic issues. Balfour gave strong support for Jackie Fisher's naval reforms.

Balfour created and chaired the Committee of Imperial Defence, which provided better long-term coordinated planning between the Army and Navy. Austen Chamberlain said Britain would have been unprepared for the First World War without his Committee of Imperial Defence. He wrote, "It is impossible to overrate the services thus rendered by Balfour to the Country and Empire....[Without the CID] victory would have been impossible." Historians also praised the Anglo-French Convention (1904), which formed the basis of the Entente Cordiale with France that proved decisive in 1914.

Balfour may have been personally sympathetic to extending suffrage, with his brother Gerald, Conservative MP for Leeds Central married to women's suffrage activist Constance Lytton's sister Betty, but he accepted the strength of the political opposition to women's suffrage, as shown in correspondence with Christabel Pankhurst, a leader of the WSPU. Balfour argued that he was "not convinced the majority of women actually wanted the vote", in 1907. A rebuttal which meant extending the activist campaign for women's rights. He was reminded by Lytton of a speech he made in 1892, namely that this question "will arise again, menacing and ripe for resolution", she asked him to meet WSPU leader, Christabel Pankhurst, after a series of hunger strikes and suffering by imprisoned suffragettes in 1907. Balfour refused on the grounds of her militancy. Christabel pleaded direct to meet Balfour as Conservative party leader, on their policy manifesto for the General Election of 1909, but he refused again as women's suffrage was "not a party question and his colleagues were divided on the matter". She tried and failed again to get his open support in parliament for women's cause in the 1910 private member's Conciliation Bill. He voted for the bill in the end but not for its progress to the Grand Committee, preventing it becoming law, and extending the activist campaigns as a result again. The following year Lytton and Annie Kenney in person after another reading of the Bill, but again it was not prioritised as government business. His sister-in-law Lady Betty Balfour spoke to Churchill that her brother was to speak for this policy, and also met the prime minister, H.H. Asquith in a 1911 delegation of the women's movements representing the Conservative and Unionist Women's Franchise Association but it was not until 1918 that (some) women were given the right to vote in elections in the United Kingdom, despite a forty-year campaign.

== Later career ==
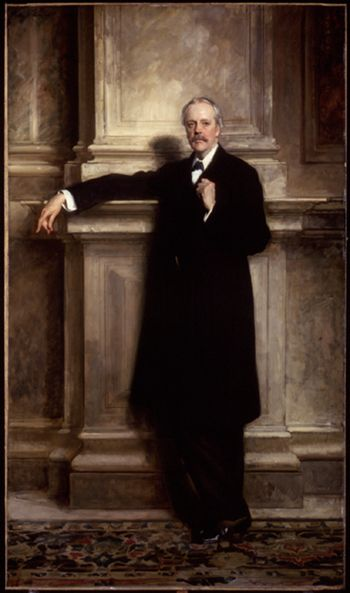
Painting by John Singer Sargent, 1908

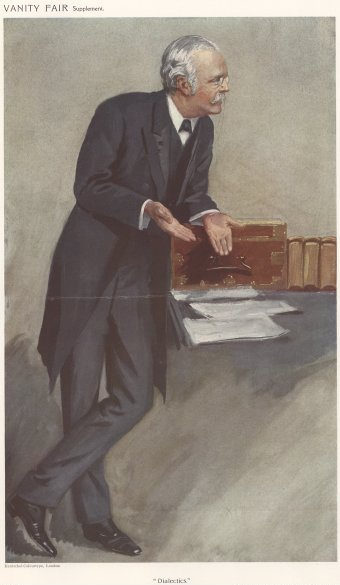
Balfour caricatured by Vanity Fair, 1910

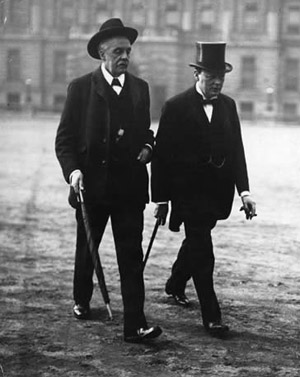
Balfour and Winston Churchill in 1911

After the general election of 1906 Balfour remained party leader, his position strengthened by Joseph Chamberlain's absence from the House of Commons after his stroke in July 1906, but he was unable to make much headway against the huge Liberal majority in the Commons. An early attempt to score a debating triumph over the government, made in Balfour's usual abstruse, theoretical style, saw Campbell-Bannerman respond with: "Enough of this foolery," to the delight of his supporters. Balfour made the controversial decision, with Lord Lansdowne, to use the heavily Unionist House of Lords as a check on the political programme and legislation of the Liberal party in the Commons. Legislation was vetoed or altered by amendments between 1906 and 1909, leading David Lloyd George to remark that the Lords was "the right hon. Gentleman's poodle. It fetches and carries for him. It barks for him. It bites anybody that he sets it on to. And we are told that this is a great revising Chamber, the safeguard of liberty in the country." The issue was forced by the Liberals with Lloyd George's People's Budget, provoking the constitutional crisis that led to the Parliament Act 1911, which limited the Lords to delaying bills for up to two years. After the Unionists lost the general elections of 1910 (despite softening the tariff reform policy with Balfour's promise of a referendum on food taxes), the Unionist peers split to allow the Parliament Act to pass the House of Lords, to prevent mass creation of Liberal peers by the new King, George V. The exhausted Balfour resigned as party leader after the crisis, and was succeeded in late 1911 by Bonar Law.

Balfour remained important in the party, however, and when the Unionists joined Asquith's coalition government in May 1915, Balfour succeeded Churchill as First Lord of the Admiralty. When Asquith's government collapsed in December 1916, Balfour, who seemed a potential successor to the premiership, became foreign secretary in Lloyd George's new administration, but not in the small War Cabinet, and was frequently left out of inner workings of government. Balfour's service as foreign secretary was notable for the Balfour Mission, a crucial alliance-building visit to the US in April 1917, and the Balfour Declaration of 1917, a letter to Lord Rothschild affirming the government's support for the establishment of a "national home for the Jewish people" in Palestine, then part of the Ottoman Empire.

Balfour resigned as foreign secretary following the Versailles Conference in 1919, but continued in the government (and the Cabinet after normal peacetime political arrangements resumed) as Lord President of the Council. In 1921–22 he represented the British Empire at the Washington Naval Conference and during summer 1922 stood in for the foreign secretary, Lord Curzon, who was ill. He put forward a proposal for the international settlement of war debts and reparations (the Balfour Note), but it was not accepted.

On 5 May 1922, Balfour was created Earl of Balfour and Viscount Traprain, of Whittingehame, in the county of Haddington. In October 1922 he, with most of the Conservative leadership, resigned with Lloyd George's government following the Carlton Club meeting, a Conservative back-bench revolt against continuance of the coalition. Bonar Law became prime minister. Like many Coalition leaders, he did not hold office in the Conservative governments of 1922–1924, but as an elder statesman, he was consulted by the King in the choice of Stanley Baldwin as Bonar Law's successor as Conservative leader in May 1923. His advice was strongly in favour of Baldwin, ostensibly due to Baldwin's being an MP but in reality motivated by his personal dislike of Curzon. Later that evening, he met a mutual friend who asked 'Will dear George be chosen?' to which he replied with "feline Balfourian satisfaction," "No, dear George will not." His hostess replied, "Oh, I am so sorry to hear that. He will be terribly disappointed." Balfour retorted, "Oh, I don't know. After all, even if he has lost the hope of glory he still possesses the means of Grace."

Balfour was not initially included in Baldwin's second government in 1924, but in 1925, he returned to the Cabinet, in place of the late Lord Curzon as Lord President of the Council, until the government ended in 1929. With 28 years of government service, Balfour had one of the longest ministerial careers in modern British politics, second only to Winston Churchill.

== Last years ==
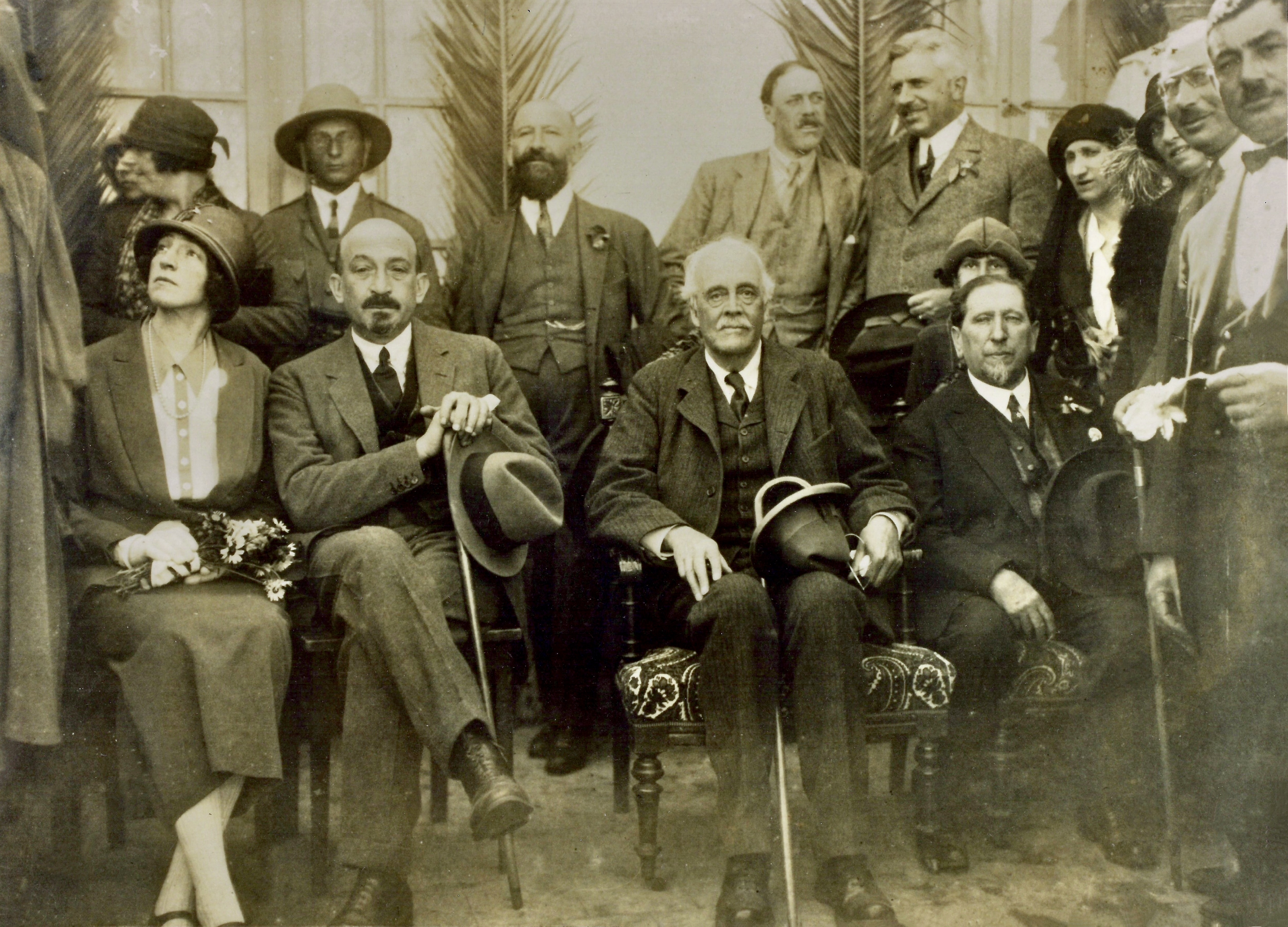
Balfour in Mandatory Palestine with Vera and Chaim Weizmann, Nahum Sokolow and others in 1925

Lord Balfour had generally good health until 1928 and remained until then a regular tennis player. Four years previously he had been the first president of the International Lawn Tennis Club of Great Britain. At the end of 1928, most of his teeth were removed and he suffered the unremitting circulatory trouble which ended his life. Before that, he had suffered occasional phlebitis and, by late 1929, he was immobilised by it. Following a visit from Chaim Weizmann, Balfour died at his brother Gerald's home, Fishers Hill House in Hook Heath, Woking, where he had lived since January 1929, on 19 March 1930. At his request a public funeral was declined, and he was buried on 22 March beside members of his family at Whittingehame in a Church of Scotland service although he also belonged to the Church of England. By special remainder, his title passed to his brother Gerald.

== Personality ==
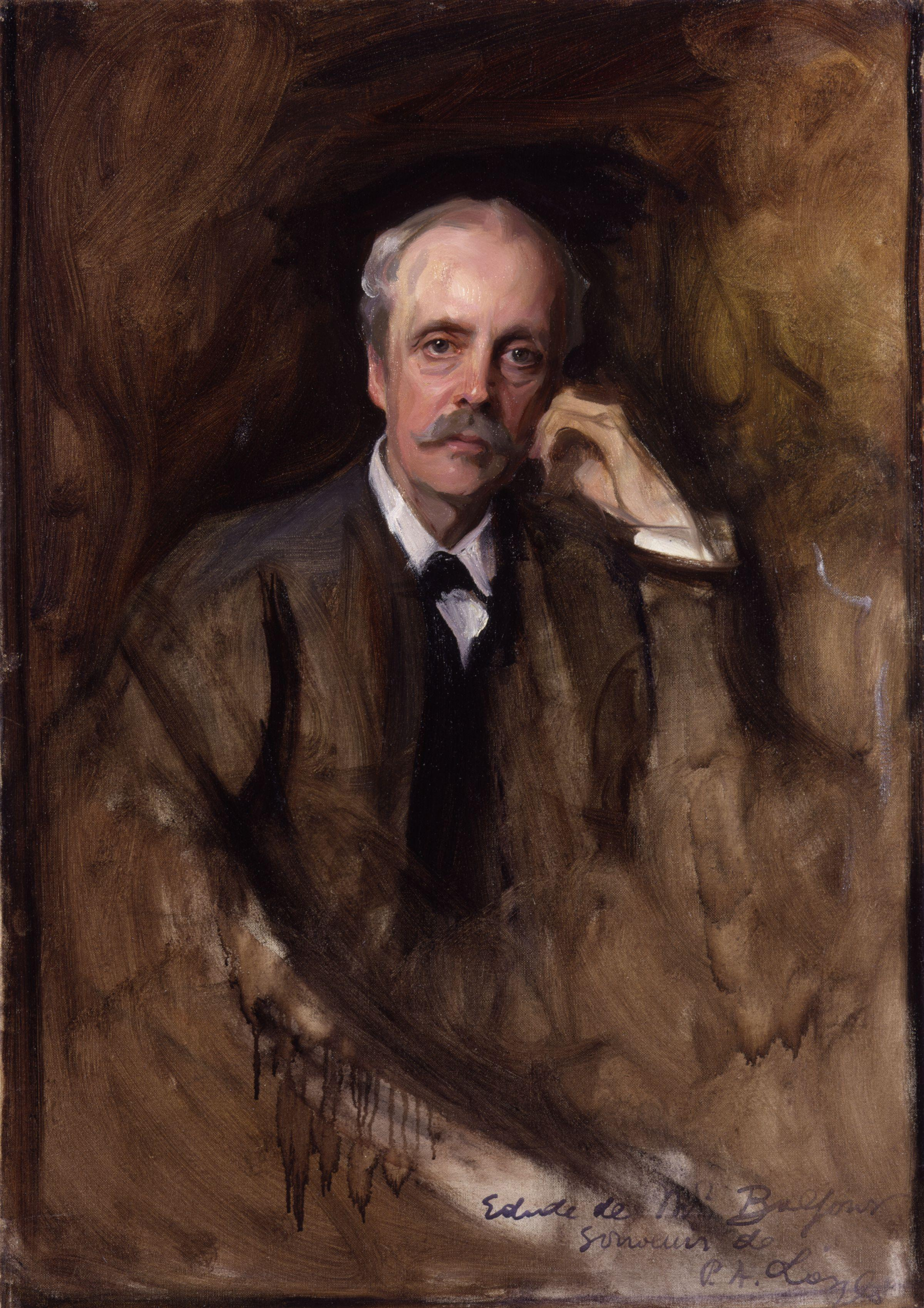
Portrait by Philip de László, 1908

Early in Balfour's career he was thought to be merely amusing himself with politics, and it was regarded as doubtful whether his health could withstand the severity of English winters. He was considered a dilettante by his colleagues; regardless, Lord Salisbury gave increasingly powerful posts in his government to his nephew.

Beatrice Webb wrote in her diary:

A man of extraordinary grace of mind and body, delighting in all that is beautiful and distinguished––music, literature, philosophy, religious feeling and moral disinterestedness, aloof from all the greed and crying of common human nature. But a strange paradox as Prime Minister of a great empire! I doubt whether even foreign affairs interest him. For all economic and social questions I gather he has an utter loathing, while the machinery of government and administration would seem to him a disagreeable irrelevance.

Balfour developed a manner known to friends as the Balfourian manner. Harold Begbie, a journalist, attacked him for what Begbie considered Balfour's self-obsession:

This Balfourian manner...an attitude of mind—an attitude of convinced superiority which insists in the first place on complete detachment from the enthusiasms of the human race, and in the second place on keeping the vulgar world at arm's length....To Mr. Arthur Balfour this studied attitude of aloofness has been fatal, both to his character and to his career. He has said nothing, written nothing, done nothing, which lives in the heart of his countrymen....the charming, gracious, and cultured Mr. Balfour is the most egotistical of men, and a man who would make almost any sacrifice to remain in office.

However, Graham Goodlad argued to the contrary:

Balfour's air of detachment was a pose. He was sincere in his conservatism, mistrusting radical political and social change and believing deeply in the Union with Ireland, the Empire and the superiority of the British race....Those who dismissed him as a languid dilettante were wide of the mark. As Chief Secretary for Ireland from 1887 to 1891 he manifested an unflinching commitment to the maintenance of British authority in the face of popular protest. He combined a strong emphasis on law and order with measures aimed at reforming the landowning system and developing Ireland's backward rural economy.

Churchill compared Balfour to H. H. Asquith: "The difference between Balfour and Asquith is that Arthur is wicked and moral, while Asquith is good and immoral." Balfour said of himself, "I am more or less happy when being praised, not very comfortable when being abused, but I have moments of uneasiness when being explained."

Balfour was interested in the study of dialects and donated money to Joseph Wright's work on The English Dialect Dictionary. Wright wrote in the preface to the first volume that the project would have been "in vain" had he not received the donation from Balfour.

Balfour was into the 1920s a keen player both of lawn tennis and of golf. In the latter sport, he had a handicap of eight at the time he was prime minister, he won the Parliamentary Handicap between members of parliament in 1894, 1897 and 1910, and served as captain both of The Royal and Ancient Golf Club of St Andrews in 1894 and the newly founded Rye club in 1895. Balfour was a patron of Manchester City F.C. He was also a keen motorist and received, as an 80th birthday present, a Rolls-Royce from both Houses of Parliament.

== Writings and academic achievements ==
As a philosopher, Balfour formulated the basis for the evolutionary argument against naturalism. Balfour argued the Darwinian premise of selection for reproductive fitness cast doubt on scientific naturalism, because human cognitive facilities that would accurately perceive truth could be less advantageous than adaptation for evolutionarily useful illusions.

As he says:

[There is] no distinction to be drawn between the development of reason and that of any other faculty, physiological or psychical, by which the interests of the individual or the race are promoted. From the humblest form of nervous irritation at the one end of the scale, to the reasoning capacity of the most advanced races at the other, everything without exception (sensation, instinct, desire, volition) has been produced directly or indirectly, by natural causes acting for the most part on strictly utilitarian principles. Convenience, not knowledge, therefore, has been the main end to which this process has tended.

— Arthur Balfour

He was a member of the Society for Psychical Research, a society studying psychic and paranormal phenomena, and was its president from 1892 to 1894. In 1914, he delivered the Gifford Lectures at the University of Glasgow, which formed the basis for his book Theism and Humanism (1915).

=== Views on race ===
In 1906, during a House of Commons debate, Balfour argued that the disenfranchisement of the blacks in South Africa was not immoral. He said:

We have to face the facts. Men are not born equal, the white and black races are not born with equal capacities: they are born with different capacities which education cannot and will not change.

Political scholar Yousef Munayyer has claimed that Arthur Balfour's antisemitism played a role in the issuance of the Balfour Declaration, citing Balfour's presiding over, as prime minister, the passage of the Aliens Act 1905 that mainly aimed to minimize Jewish immigration to Britain from Eastern Europe. Balfour had written in 1919, in his introduction to Nahum Sokolow's History of Zionism, that the Zionist movement would:

mitigate the age-long miseries created for Western civilization by the presence in its midst of a Body [the Jews] which it too long regarded as alien and even hostile, but which it was equally unable to expel or to absorb.

== Artistic ==
Portrait by Walter Stoneman, 1921

After the First World War, when there was controversy over the style of headstone proposed for use on British war graves by the Imperial War Graves Commission, Balfour submitted a design for a cruciform headstone. At an exhibition in August 1919, it drew many criticisms; the commission's principal architect, Sir John Burnet said that Balfour's cross, if used in large numbers in cemeteries, would create a criss-cross visual effect, destroying any sense of "restful dignity"; Edwin Lutyens called it "extraordinarily ugly", and its shape was variously described as resembling a shooting target or bottle. His design was not accepted but the Commission offered him a second chance to submit another design which he did not take up, having been refused once. After a further exhibition in the House of Commons, the "Balfour cross" was ultimately rejected in favour of the standard headstone the Commission permanently adopted because the latter offered more space for inscriptions and service emblems.

== Popular culture ==
Balfour occasionally appears in popular culture.

- A fictionalised version of Arthur Balfour (identified as "Mr. Balfour") appears as British prime minister in the science fiction romance The Angel of the Revolution by George Griffith, published in 1893 (when Balfour was still in opposition) but set in an imagined near future of 1903–1905.
- Balfour was the subject of two parody novels based on Alice in Wonderland, Clara in Blunderland (1902) and Lost in Blunderland (1903), which appeared under the pseudonym Caroline Lewis; one of the co-authors was Harold Begbie.

== Legacy ==
Balfour's premiership from July 1902 to December 1905 is unusual among modern prime ministers because it did not mark the culmination of his political career. Instead, it was merely an episode in a long life of public service, and he quickly recovered from the setbacks of his chequered premiership. He continued to serve in government for nearly a quarter of a century after leaving 10 Downing Street, despite being forced from the leadership of his party.

Balfour's reputation among historians is mixed. There is agreement about his achievements, as represented by G. M. Trevelyan:

As the prime author of the Education Act, the Licensing Act, Irish Land Purchase and the Committee of Imperial Defence, Balfour has a strong claim to be numbered among the successful Prime Ministers.

But Trevelyan admits that, "owing to the portentous character of the electoral catastrophe of 1906 that claim is not always been allowed; yet Balfour had done great things on his own initiative and by his own strength of character." John L. Gordon pays more attention to the defeats he suffered, stating:

Although Balfour's achievements during his brief prime ministry are noteworthy... he is usually seen as an ineffective leader. He was unable to prevent a split in his party over trade policy, and the Unionist-Conservatives suffered a massive defeat in the election of January 1906. Failing to lead his party to victory in the two general elections of 1910, he resigned as leader in 1911.

=== Memorials ===
A memorial statue in the Members' Lobby in the House of Commons was unveiled in 1962. The statue was attacked by 2 activists for Palestine Action who were arrested for criminal damage.

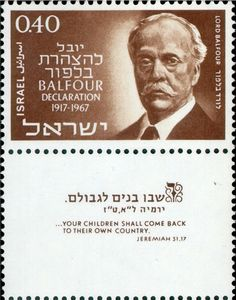
1967 Israel stamp commemorating the 50th anniversary of the Balfour Declaration

Balfouria, a moshav in northern Israel, along with many streets in Israel, are named after him. The residence of the Prime Minister of Israel, Beit Aghion, is on the corner of Balfour St. in Jerusalem, and the building is colloquially known as Beit Balfour. The town of Balfour in Mpumalanga, South Africa, was named after him.

A portrait of Balfour by Philip de László is in the collection of Trinity College, Cambridge. The 1914 portrait was vandalised (sprayed with red paint and slashed) by an activist of the Palestine Action network during the Gaza War. The portrait was repaired, at an estimated cost of £24,000.

=== Honours and decorations ===
- His appointment as a Deputy Lieutenant of Ross-shire on 10 September 1880 gave him the post-nominal letters "DL".
- He was sworn of the Privy Council of the United Kingdom in 1885, giving him the style "The Right Honourable" and after ennoblement the post-nominal letters "PC" for life.
- On 3 June 1916 he was appointed to the Order of Merit, giving him the post-nominal letters "OM" for life.
- He was elected an International Honorary Member of the American Academy of Arts and Sciences in 1902 and an International Member of the American Philosophical Society in 1917.
- In 1919 he was elected Chancellor of his old university, Cambridge, in succession to his brother-in-law, Lord Rayleigh.
- He was made a Knight Companion of the Order of the Garter on 3 March 1922, becoming Sir Arthur Balfour and giving him the post-nominal letters "KG" for life.
- On 5 May 1922 Balfour was raised to the peerage as Earl of Balfour and Viscount Traprain, of Whittingehame, in the county of Haddington. This allowed him to sit in the House of Lords.
- He was awarded the Estonian Cross of Liberty (conferred between 1919 and 1925), third grade, first class, for Civilian Service.

He was given the Freedom of the City/Freedom of the Borough of the following:

- (Scotland) 28 September 1899: Dundee
- 20 September 1902: Haddington, East Lothian
- 19 October 1905: Edinburgh

=== Honorary degrees ===
Honorary degrees conferred on Arthur Balfour, by country
| Country | Date | School | Degree |
|---|---|---|---|
| England | 1909 | University of Liverpool | Doctor of Laws (LL.D.) |
| England | 1909 | University of Birmingham | Doctor of Laws (LL. D) |
| England | 1912 | University of Sheffield | Doctor of Laws (LL.D.) |
| USA | 1917 | Columbia University | Doctor of Laws (LL.D.) |
| Canada | 1917 | University of Toronto | Doctor of Laws (LL.D.) |
| Wales | 1921 | University of Wales | Doctor of Letters (D.Litt.) |
| England | 1924 | University of Leeds | Doctor of Laws (LL.D.) |

== Arms ==
Coat of arms of Arthur Balfour, 1st Earl of Balfour
| Crest A palm tree proper. Escutcheon Argent, on a chevron engrailed between three mullets sable as many otters’ heads erased of the field. Supporters Two otters proper, collared or. Motto Virtus ad æthera tendit (Virtue strives toward heaven). Orders The Most Noble Order of the Garter (Knight Companion - KG) |

== See also ==
- Balfour Declaration
- Balfour Declaration of 1926
- Palm Sunday Case

== Sources ==
- Adams, R.J.Q. (2002). Ramsden, John (ed.). The Oxford Companion to Twentieth-Century British Politics.
- Cannon, John; Crowcroft, Robert, eds. (2015). A Dictionary of British History (3rd ed.). Oxford University Press.
- Torrance, David, The Scottish Secretaries (Birlinn Limited 2006)
- Chisholm, Hugh (1911). "Balfour, Arthur James" . In Chisholm, Hugh (ed.). Encyclopædia Britannica. Vol. 3 (11th ed.). Cambridge University Press. pp. 250–254. This article was written by Chisholm himself soon after Balfour's premiership, while he was still leader of the Opposition. It includes a significant amount of contemporaneous analysis, some of which is summarised here.

Political offices
| Preceded by Sir Charles Dilke | President of the Local Government Board; 1885–1886 | Succeeded by Joseph Chamberlain |
| Preceded by The Earl of Dalhousie | Secretary for Scotland; 1886–1887 | Succeeded by The Marquess of Lothian |
| Preceded by Sir Michael Hicks-Beach | Chief Secretary for Ireland; 1887–1891 | Succeeded by William Lawies Jackson |
| Preceded by W. H. Smith | First Lord of the Treasury; 1891–1892 | Succeeded by William Ewart Gladstone |
| Preceded by W. H. Smith | Leader of the House of Commons; 1891–1892 | Succeeded by William Ewart Gladstone |
| Preceded by The Earl of Rosebery | First Lord of the Treasury; 1895–1905 | Succeeded by Sir Henry Campbell-Bannerman |
| Preceded by Sir William Vernon Harcourt | Leader of the House of Commons; 1895–1905 | Succeeded by Sir Henry Campbell-Bannerman |
| Preceded by The 3rd Marquess of Salisbury | Lord Privy Seal; 1902–1903 | Succeeded by The 4th Marquess of Salisbury |
| Preceded by The 3rd Marquess of Salisbury | Prime Minister of the United Kingdom; 12 July 1902 – 4 December 1905 | Succeeded by Sir Henry Campbell-Bannerman |
| Preceded by Sir Henry Campbell-Bannerman | Leader of the Opposition; 1905–1911 | Succeeded by Bonar Law |
| Preceded by Winston Churchill | First Lord of the Admiralty; 1915–1916 | Succeeded by Sir Edward Carson |
| Preceded by The Viscount Grey of Fallodon | Foreign Secretary; 10 December 1916 – 23 October 1919 | Succeeded by The Earl Curzon of Kedleston |
| Preceded by The Earl Curzon of Kedleston | Lord President of the Council; 1919–1922 | Succeeded by The 4th Marquess of Salisbury |
| Preceded by The Marquess Curzon of Kedleston | Lord President of the Council; 1925–1929 | Succeeded by The Lord Parmoor |
Parliament of the United Kingdom
| Preceded by Robert Dimsdale | Member of Parliament for Hertford; 1874–1885 | Succeeded by Abel Smith |
| New constituency | Member of Parliament for Manchester East; 1885–1906 | Succeeded by Thomas Gardner Horridge |
| Preceded by Alban Gibbs; Sir Edward Clarke | Member of Parliament for the City of London; February 1906 – 1922; With: Sir Edward Clarke to June 1906; Sir Frederick Banbury from June 1906 | Succeeded by Edward Grenfell; Sir Frederick Banbury |
Party political offices
| Preceded by W. H. Smith | Conservative Leader of the Commons | Succeeded by Bonar Law |
| Preceded by The 3rd Marquess of Salisbury | Leader of the Conservative Party; 1902–1911 | Succeeded by Bonar Law |
Academic offices
| Preceded by The Lord Reay | Rector of the University of St Andrews; 1886–1889 | Succeeded by The Marquess of Dufferin and Ava |
| Preceded by The Earl of Lytton | Rector of the University of Glasgow; 1890–1893 | Succeeded by John Eldon Gorst |
| Preceded by Lord Glencorse | Chancellor of the University of Edinburgh; 1891–1930 | Succeeded by J. M. Barrie |
| Preceded by The Lord Rayleigh | Chancellor of the University of Cambridge; 1919–1930 | Succeeded by Stanley Baldwin |
| New institution | Visitor of Girton College, Cambridge; 1924–1930 | Succeeded by The Earl Baldwin of Bewdley |
Peerage of the United Kingdom
| New creation | Earl of Balfour; 1922–1930 | Succeeded by Gerald William Balfour |
Awards and achievements
| Preceded by John Ringling | Cover of Time magazine 13 April 1925 | Succeeded by Walter P. Chrysler |
Scottish feudal lordship
| Preceded by Sir Charles Dalrymple | Lord and Baron of Hailes; 1876–1930 | Succeeded by Gerald William Balfour |
