= Vansittart Bowater =

British Conservative politician (1862–1938)

Sir Thomas Vansittart Bowater Bt DL MP
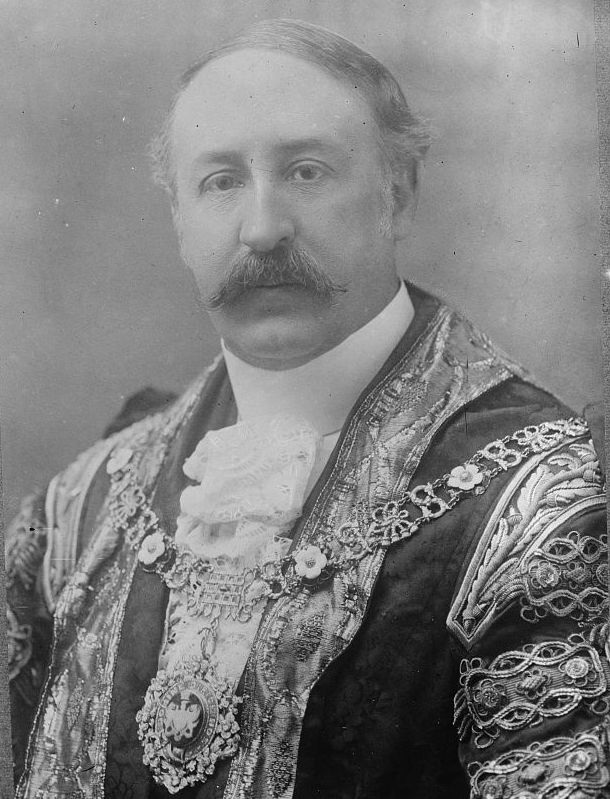
- Bowater c. 1913

Member of Parliament for City of London
- In office 1924–1938

Lord Mayor of London
- In office 1913–1914
- Preceded by: David Burnett
- Succeeded by: Charles Johnston

Personal details
- Born: 29 October 1862
- Died: 28 March 1938 (aged 75)
- Party: Conservative

Sir Thomas Vansittart Bowater, 1st Baronet (29 October 1862 – 28 March 1938) was a British Conservative Party politician who served as Lord Mayor of London from 1913 to 1914 and as one of the city's Members of Parliament (MPs) from 1924 to 1938.

== Career ==
Bowater was the son of William Vansittart Bowater and his wife, Eliza Jane née Davey. On 8 June 1887, he married Emily Margaret Spencer and they later had six children. From 1905 to 1906, he was a Sheriff of the City of London. In 1906, he was knighted by King Edward VII. Bowater was subsequently elected as Lord Mayor of London in 1913 and on finishing this post a year later, he was created Baronet Bowater, of Hill Crest in the Borough of Croydon. His wife died in 1924 and a year later he married Alice Mary Hoskins. Bowater was later one of two MPs for the City of London from 1924 to 1938. He also held the office of Deputy Lieutenant (DL).

== Honours and awards ==
During his life Bowater received several national and foreign honours:

- Knight Bachelor
- Honorary Colonel of the 10th Royal Fusiliers
- Baronet Bowater, of Hill Crest, Croydon
- Commander of the Order of Leopold of Belgium
- Officer of the Order of the Crown of Belgium
- Commander 1st Class of the Order of Dannebrog of Denmark
- Commander of the Legion of Honour of France
- Grand Commander of the Order of the Redeemer of Greece
- Knight 1st Class of the Order of St. Olaf of Norway

Political offices
Preceded by David Burnett	Lord Mayor of London; 1913–1914	Succeeded by Charles Johnston
Parliament of the United Kingdom
Preceded by Frederick Banbury; Edward Grenfell	Member of Parliament for the City of London; 1924–1938; With: Edward Grenfell 1924–1935; Alan Anderson 1935–1938	Succeeded by Alan Anderson; George Broadbridge
Peerage of the United Kingdom
New creation	Baronet (of Hill Crest); 1914–1938	Succeeded by Rainald Bowater
