= 1945 City of London by-election =

UK Parliamentary by-election

The 1945 City of London by-election was held on 31 October 1945. The by-election was held due to the elevation to hereditary peerage of the incumbent Conservative MP, George Broadbridge. It was won by the Conservative candidate and sitting Chairman of the Conservative Party Ralph Assheton who had lost Rushcliffe at the general election earlier in the year.

1945 City of London by-election
Party	Candidate	Votes	%	±%
Conservative	Ralph Assheton	4,506	74.99	+38.68
Liberal	Arthur Comyns Carr	1,503	25.01	+14.00
Majority		3,003	49.98	N/A
Turnout		6,009	51.58	−12.3
Conservative hold		Swing		
