= June 1906 City of London by-election =

UK parliamentary by-election

The June 1906 City of London by-election was held on 15 June 1906. The by-election was held due to the resignation of the incumbent Conservative MP, Sir Edward Clarke. It was won by the Conservative candidate Frederick Banbury, who was unopposed.
