= 1935 City of London by-election =

UK Parliamentary by-election

The 1935 City of London by-election was held on 26 June 1935. The by-election was held due to the incumbent Conservative MP, Edward Grenfell being raised to the peerage as Baron St Just. It was won by the Conservative candidate Alan Anderson.
