= William Beckford (politician) =

British politician (1709–1770)

Sir William Beckford
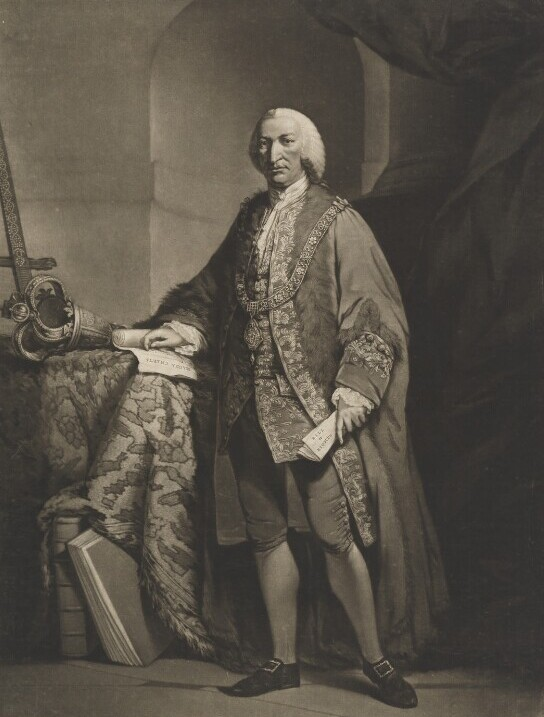
- Born: December 1709; Jamaica
- Died: 21 June 1770 (aged 60)
- Education: Westminster School
- Spouse: Maria Marsh (m. 1756)
- Children: 9, including William and Richard
- Father: Peter Beckford
- Relatives: Peter Beckford (grandfather); William Beckford of Somerley (nephew); Julines Beckford (brother)

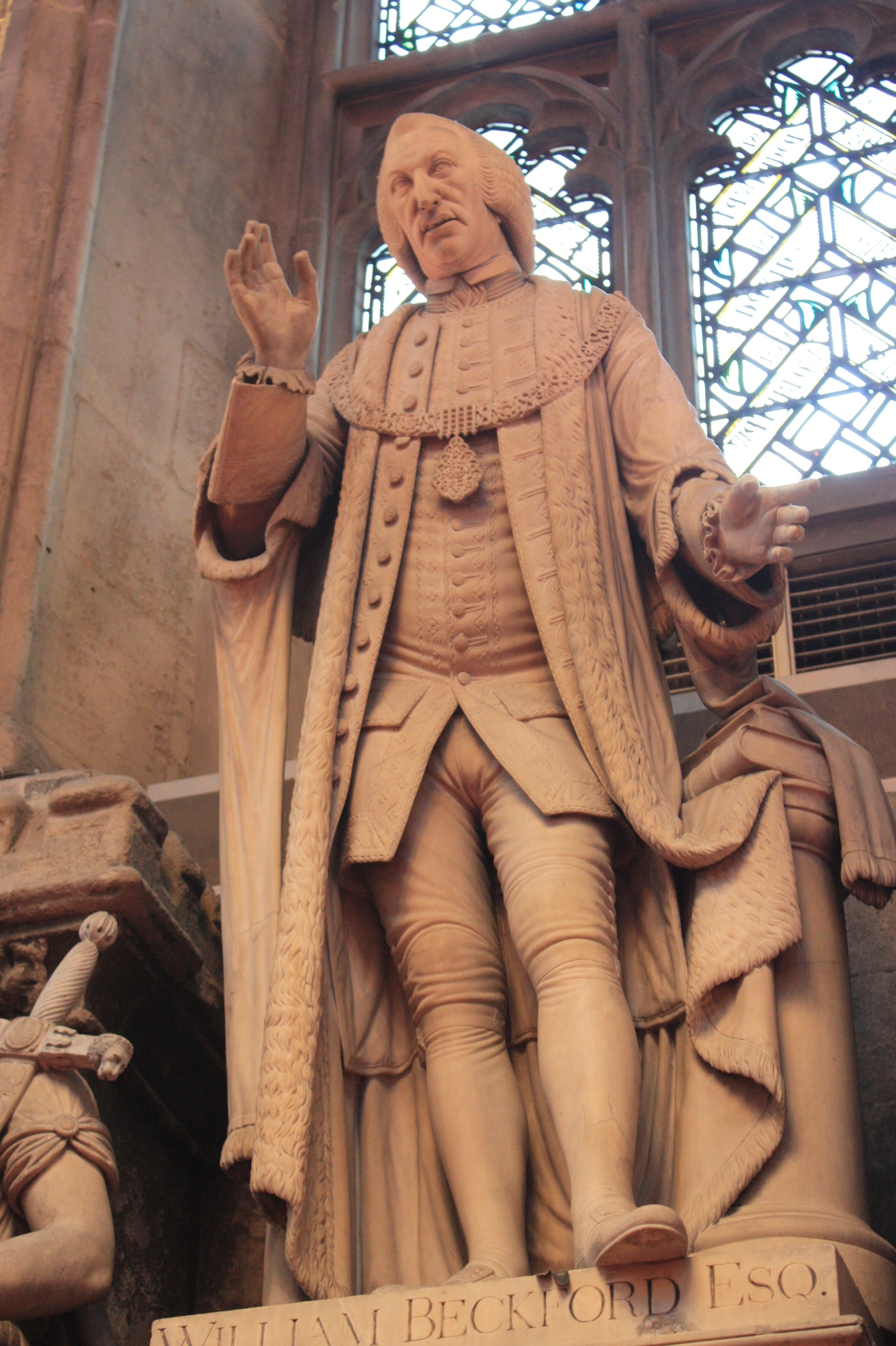
Statue of William Beckford atop the huge monument in his memory, Guildhall, London, by John Francis Moore

Sir William Beckford (December 1709 – 21 June 1770) was a British Whig politician who twice served as Lord Mayor of London in 1762 and 1769. One of the best known political figures in Georgian era London, his vast wealth derived from the sugar plantations and hundreds of slaves he owned in the British colony of Jamaica. In Britain, Beckford was a supporter of the Whig party, including Prime Minister William Pitt, 1st Earl of Chatham. He also publicly supported progressive causes and frequently championed the London public.

== Early life ==
In 1709, William was born in the British colony of Jamaica, the son of Peter Beckford, Speaker of the House of Assembly there, and the grandson of Colonel Peter Beckford, sometime Governor of the colony. He was sent to England by his family in 1723 to be educated. He studied at Westminster School, and made his career in the City of London.

Between 1736 and 1744, William Beckford travelled back and forth between Jamaica and England, serving in the Jamaican militia, and as an elected representative of the island's Assembly.

== Involvement in slavery ==
Beckford's grandfather, Peter Beckford, was Governor of Jamaica, and reputedly owned 20 Jamaican estates, 1,200 slaves and left £1,500,000 in bank stock when he died in 1710. He left the vast majority of this wealth to his son Peter Beckford (junior). When Peter Beckford (junior) died in 1735, the young William Beckford inherited his vast estate, as the sole surviving legitimate son.

William Beckford was one of 13 children, but inherited the sole interest in 13 sugar plantations in Jamaica and owned approximately 3,000 enslaved Africans because his older brother, another Peter Beckford, died in 1712. He also served in the Jamaican National Assembly before returning to England in 1744.

In 1760, slaves rose up in revolt on his estate at Esher, in Saint Mary Parish, Jamaica, and they joined Tacky's War, which embroiled the Colony of Jamaica in a series of rebellions throughout the decade. According to historian Vincent Brown, 400 enslaved people were killed for their part in the rebellion, and their leader was burned alive.

== Domestic life ==
In 1744 Beckford bought an estate at Fonthill Gifford, near Salisbury, Wiltshire. He made substantial improvements to the property but it was largely destroyed by fire in 1755. "I have an odd fifty thousand pounds in a drawer: I will build it up again," Beckford promptly declared, and rebuilt it as Fonthill Splendens.

On 8 June 1756, aged 47, he married Maria Marsh, daughter of the Hon. George Hamilton. His only child by this marriage was William Thomas Beckford. Beckford also had eight children born out of wedlock who were left legacies in his will.

From 1751 until his death, his London residence was at 22 Soho Square, which became the centre of his political activities.

== Political life ==
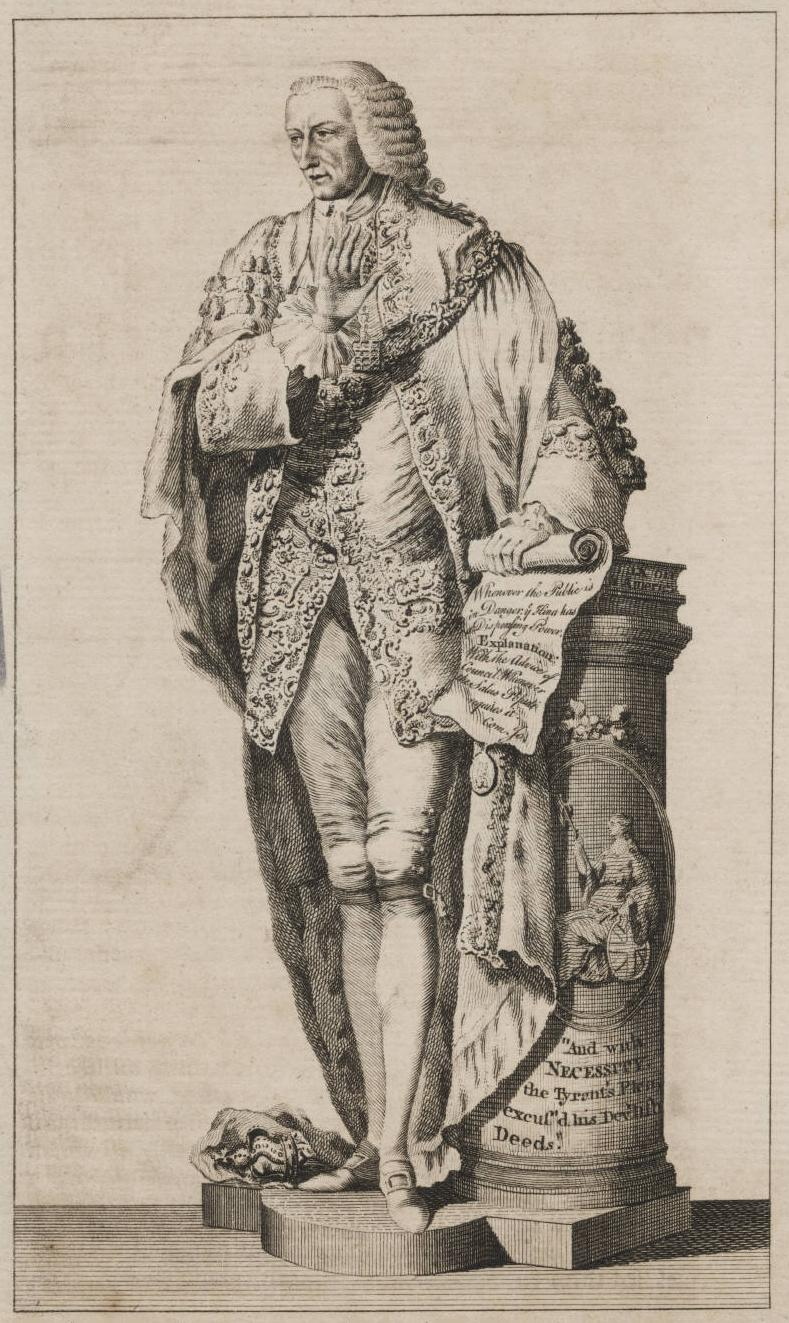
Engraving of a statue of Beckford

He became an alderman in 1752, a Sheriff of London in 1756 and was then elected Lord Mayor of London first in 1762 and again in 1769. He was returned as Member of Parliament (MP) for the City of London in 1754. As a rich patron, he used his 'interest' in favour of William Pitt the Elder, sponsoring and encouraging his political rise, supporting the Whig cause in general and the West Indies sugar industry (from which his fortune came) in particular.

In 1753 Beckford’s Bedfordite allies helped to finance the opposition weekly The Protester, edited by James Ralph; Bedford’s secretary Richard Rigby praised the opening number as “an extremely good preface to a political paper.”

In September 1758 he wrote to Pitt advising him on the advisability of attacking the French colony of Martinique:

[Martinique] has but one town of strength (...); all the inhabitants (...) have not victuals to support themselves and numerous slaves for one month, without a foreign supply. The Negroes and stock of the island are worth above four million sterling and the conquest easy (...) For God's sake attempt the capture without delay.

Although some laughed at his faulty Latin, his wealth, social position and power obliged people to respect him. He hosted sumptuous feasts, one of which cost £10,000. On one occasion six dukes, two marquises, twenty-three earls, four Viscounts, and fourteen barons from the House of Lords joined members of the House of Commons in a procession to honour him, followed by one of these banquets. He also drew some popular support due to his promotion of political liberalism, in opposition to the party of the 'King's Friends'.

In March 1770 following the release of John Wilkes, of whom Beckford had been an ardent supporter, Beckford decorated his house with a large banner, which according to Horace Walpole bore the word Liberty written in 3-foot-high (0.91 m) embroidered white letters. A few weeks later, on 23 May, Beckford publicly admonished George III. Breaking contemporary protocol he asked the King to dissolve Parliament and to remove his civil councillors, referring to "our happy constitution as it was established in the Glorious and Necessary Revolution". King George was reportedly more enraged by the breach of protocol than by the nature of the request, yet it attracted the support of the Common Councilmen of London who expressed their gratitude by erecting a monument in the Guildhall, London including a life-size statue of Beckford (pictured), surmounting a stone tablet on which the words Beckford had used to admonish the king are engraved in gold.

== Legacy ==
In 1929, the London County Council renamed a school in Broomsleigh Street, West Hampstead as Beckford Primary School. In 2020, as part of the Black Lives Matter movement, the London Borough of Camden announced they would rename the school again. Possible new names included Beryl Gilroy, after the school's first black headteacher. However, as of September 2021, the new name is West Hampstead Primary School.

Parliament of Great Britain
Preceded by George Pitt; Cuthbert Ellison	Member of Parliament for Shaftesbury; 1747–1754; With: Cuthbert Ellison	Succeeded by James Brudenell; Sir Thomas Clavering, Bt
Preceded by John Jolliffe; William Gerard Hamilton	Member of Parliament for Petersfield; 1754–1754; With: William Gerard Hamilton	Succeeded by William Gerard Hamilton; Sir John Philipps, Bt
Preceded by Sir John Barnard; Sir William Calvert; Slingsby Bethell; Stephen Theodore Janssen	Member of Parliament for London; 1754–1770; With: Sir John Barnard 1754–1761; Slingsby Bethell 1754–1758; Sir Robert Ladbroke 1754–1770; Sir Richard Glyn, Bt 1758–1768; Thomas Harley 1761–1770; Barlow Trecothick 1768–1770	Succeeded by Sir Robert Ladbroke; Thomas Harley; Barlow Trecothick; Richard Oliver
