= Sir Richard Glyn, 1st Baronet, of Ewell =

Lord Mayor of London

Sir Richard Glyn Bt
- Born: 13 June 1711
- Died: 1 January 1773 (aged 61)
- Occupations: Banker, politician
- Organization(s): Williams & Glyn's Bank (originally Bank of Vere, Glyn & Hallifax)
- Known for: Founding Williams & Glyn's Bank with Joseph Vere and Thomas Hallifax
- Title: Lord Mayor of London
- Term: 1758
- Spouse(s): Susannah Lewen, Elizabeth Carr
- Children: Sir Richard Glyn, 1st Baronet, of Gaunt's House

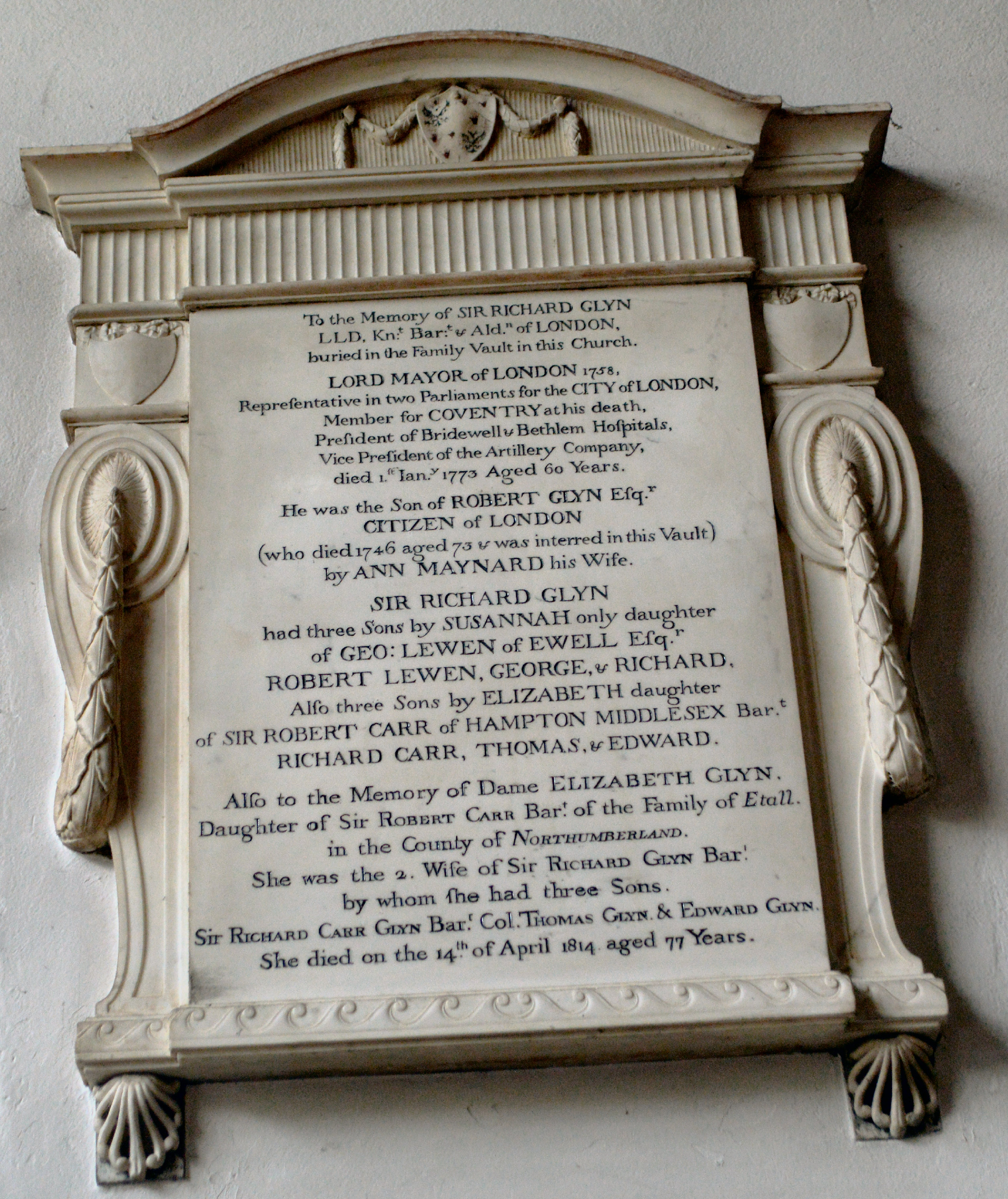
St Mary's Church, Ewell

Sir Richard Glyn, 1st Baronet (13 June 1711 – 1 January 1773) was a British banker and politician, who together with Joseph Vere and Thomas Hallifax founded the Bank of Vere, Glyn & Hallifax, which evolved into Williams & Glyn's Bank.

He served as Sheriff of London in 1753 and as Lord Mayor of London in 1758. He was also member of parliament for the City of London from 1758 to 1768 and for Coventry from 1768 to 1773. In 1758 he was created a baronet, of Ewell in the County of Surrey.

According to the historic Gaunts House in Wimborne, the Glyns descended from Cilmin Troed Ddu of Glynnlivon, Caernarvonshire, North Wales, who was born around 820 and chief of the fourth noble tribe of Wales. Richard acquired the Dorset Estates in the mid-18th Century. According to the British Museum, he was a drysalter and banker. He was an MP for the City of London from 1758 to 1768, and for Coventry from 1768 to 1773. He had an eldest son by his 2nd marriage, Sir Richard Carr Glyn of Gaunts, Dorset. Their family crest involves a sable and an eagle

Glyn married firstly Susannah (née Lewen) in 1736. After her death in 1751 he married secondly Elizabeth (née Carr) in 1754. Glyn died in January 1773, aged 61, and was succeeded in the baronetcy by his son from his first marriage, George. His son from his second marriage, Richard, was created a baronet in his own right in 1800.

== Notes ==
Parliament of Great Britain
| Preceded by Sir John Barnard; Slingsby Bethell; Sir Robert Ladbroke; William Beckford | Member of Parliament for the City of London; 1758–1768; With: Sir John Barnard 1758–1761; Sir Robert Ladbroke 1758–1768; William Beckford 1758–1768; Thomas Harley 1761–1768 | Succeeded by Sir Robert Ladbroke; William Beckford; Thomas Harley; Barlow Trecothick |
| Preceded by Hon. Andrew Archer; Hon. Henry Seymour-Conway | Member of Parliament for Coventry; 1768–1773; With: Hon. Henry Seymour-Conway | Succeeded by Hon. Henry Seymour-Conway; Walter Waring |
Baronetage of Great Britain
| New creation | Baronet (of Ewell); 1759–1773 | Succeeded by George Glyn |
