= William Calvert (MP) =

British politician

Sir William Calvert (c. 1703 – 3 May 1761) was a British politician.

Educated at Emmanuel College, Cambridge, he was a Member of Parliament (MP) for the City of London in 1742–1754, Sheriff of the City of London in 1743, Lord Mayor of London in 1748–1749 and an MP for Old Sarum in 1755–1761.

Parliament of Great Britain
Preceded by Robert Godschall; Daniel Lambert; George Heathcote; Sir John Barnard	Member of Parliament for the City of London; 1742–1754; With: Sir John Barnard to 1761; Daniel Lambert to 1747; George Heathcote to 1747; Slingsby Bethell from 1747; Stephen Theodore Janssen from 1747	Succeeded by Sir John Barnard; Slingsby Bethell; Sir Robert Ladbroke; William Beckford
Preceded by Thomas Pitt of Boconnoc; Viscount Pulteney	Member of Parliament for Old Sarum; 1755–1761; With: Viscount Pulteney	Succeeded by Thomas Pitt of Boconnoc; Howell Gwynne
Civic offices
Preceded by Sir Robert Ladbroke	Lord Mayor of London; 1748–1749	Succeeded by Sir Samuel Pennant
