= Robert Waithman =

Lord Mayor of London (1764–1833)

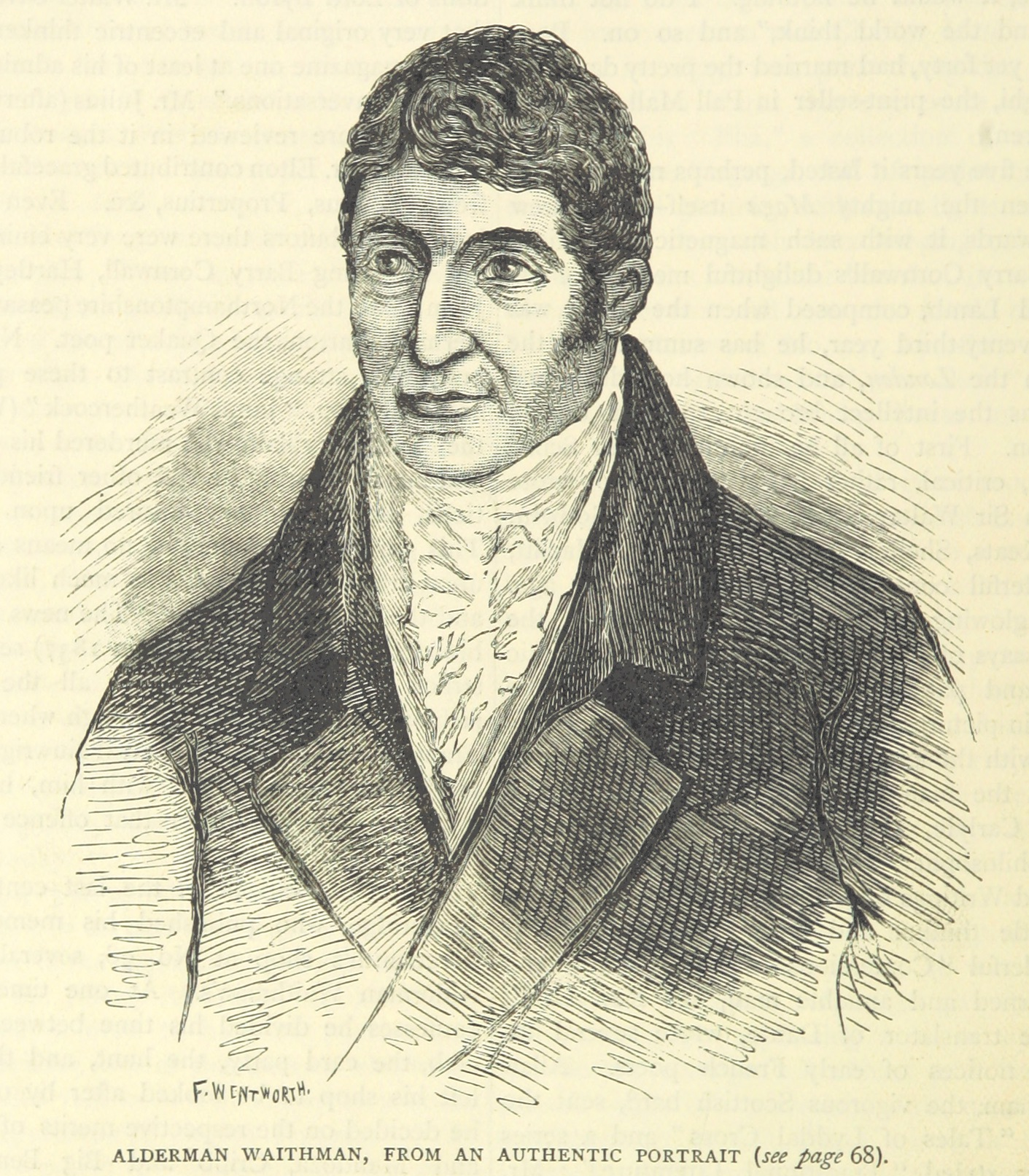
Robert Waithman

Robert Waithman (1764 – 6 February 1833) was a master draper who in later life was a British politician; an economic progressive Whig from an industrial background and a political reformist. He became an alderman of the Corporation of London who elected him as Lord Mayor of London for a standard tenure, one ceremonial year.

== Biography ==
Waithman was born at Wrexham, to John Waithman, a joiner at the Bersham Ironworks, and Mary (née Roberts).

After being employed for some time in a London linen draper's, he opened, about 1786, a draper's shop of his own, and made a considerable fortune. On 14 July 1787 he married Mary Davis, his cousin. In 1818 he was returned to Parliament, as a Whig, for the City of London. He lost his seat at the election of 1820, but regained it in 1826, and retained it till his death, taking part vigorously in the parliamentary debates, and strenuously supporting reform.

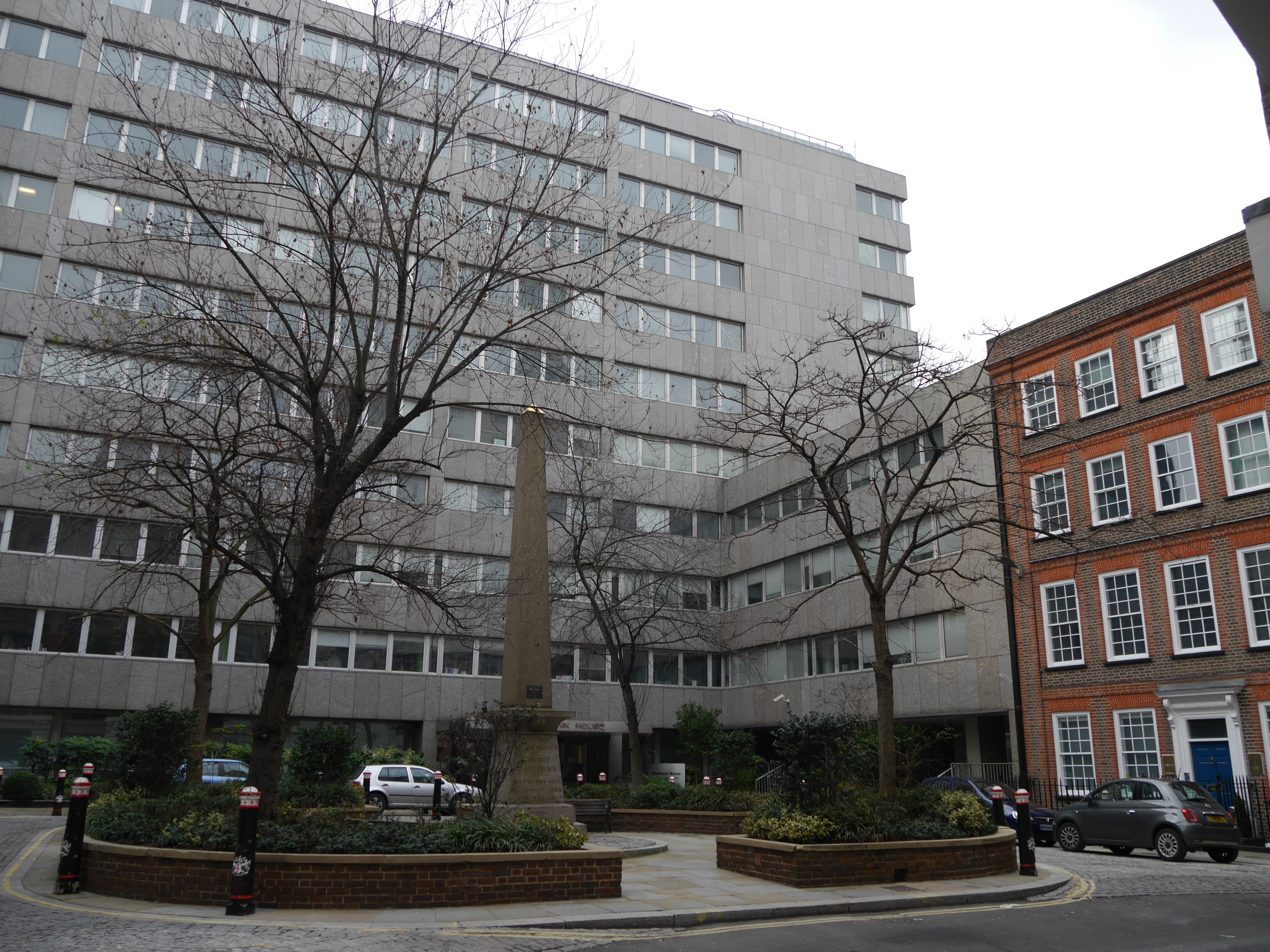
Obelisk to Waithman in Salisbury Square, St Bride's, London, EC4 previously on Ludgate Circus.

In 1820 he was appointed Sheriff of the City of London and in 1823 elected Lord Mayor of London. Waithman died in London on 6 February 1833. An obelisk erected by his friends in Ludgate Circus, London, adjoining the site of his first shop, commemorated his memory. The obelisk today forms the main monument in Salisbury Square.

== Notes ==
Parliament of the United Kingdom
Preceded by Sir William Curtis, Bt; Sir James Shaw, Bt; John Atkins; Sir Matthew Wood, Bt	Member of Parliament for the City of London; 1818 – 1820; With: Thomas Wilson; Sir Matthew Wood, Bt; John Thomas Thorp	Succeeded by Sir William Curtis, Bt; Thomas Wilson; George Bridges; Sir Matthew Wood, Bt
Preceded by Sir William Curtis, Bt; Thomas Wilson; George Bridges; Sir Matthew Wood, Bt	Member of Parliament for the City of London; 1826 – 1833; With: Sir Matthew Wood, Bt 1817–43; William Ward 1826–31; William Thompson 1826–32; William Venables 1831–32; Sir John Key, Bt from 1832	Succeeded by George Lyall; George Grote; Sir John Key, Bt; Sir Matthew Wood, Bt
Civic offices
Preceded by Sir William Heygate, Bt	Lord Mayor of London; 1823 – 1824	Succeeded by John Garratt
