= 1817 English cricket season =

Cricket season review

The 1817 English cricket season was the 31st since the foundation of Marylebone Cricket Club (MCC). Cricket was hit by a controversial match-fixing scandal. Details of seven historically important eleven-a-side matches are known. (Note: Any match listed in the ACS' Important Match Guide (1981) is historically important, and therefore of the highest standard, whether or not a scorecard might exist. The same applies to numerous matches discovered by researchers since 1981. For further information, see First-class cricket.)

== Events ==
- The 1817 season saw the first recorded instance of the Cambridge University v. Cambridge Town Club fixture that became almost annual until the 1860s. It was also the earliest historically important match to involve either team. There was a very fine line between Cambridge Town Club and Cambridgeshire CCC, the one dovetailing with the other. Similar scenarios were Nottingham/Notts, Manchester/Lancashire & Sheffield/Yorkshire.
- William Lambert scored two centuries (107* & 157) in the same match, the first player known to achieve the feat in an important match. Lambert was then banned for life by Marylebone Cricket Club (MCC) from appearing at Lord's on the grounds that he had "sold" an earlier Nottingham versus England match. Nottingham had won the game by 30 runs despite a first innings deficit and many gamblers lost heavily. Whether Lambert was actually guilty is highly questionable and certainly no proper hearing was ever organised. The whole affair is believed to have been contrived by Lord Frederick Beauclerk who wished to settle an "old score".
- According to James Pycroft in The Cricket Field, the size of the wickets was increased in 1817 to 27 inches (690 mm) by 8 inches (200 mm), but it seems more likely that the rule was introduced in 1819.
- With cricket recovering from the effects of the Napoleonic War, a total of seven matches were recorded in 1817:
  - 30 May – Cambridge University v Cambridge Town Club @ Parker's Piece, Cambridge
  - 2–4 June – England v The Bs @ Lord's Cricket Ground
  - 10–12 June – England v Surrey @ Lord's Cricket Ground
  - 18–20 June – Lord F Beauclerk's XI v W Ward's XI @ Lord's Cricket Ground
  - 2–5 July – Sussex v Epsom @ Lord's Cricket Ground
  - 6–8 August – Marylebone Cricket Club (MCC) v Hampshire @ Lord's Cricket Ground
  - 13–14 August – E H Budd's XI v W Ward's XI @ Lord's Cricket Ground
- Another match that has sometimes been regarded as is Old Etonians v Old Wykehamists at Lord's on Monday 14 July.

== Bibliography ==
- ACS (1981). A Guide to Important Cricket Matches Played in the British Isles 1709–1863. Nottingham: ACS. OCLC 85045528.
- Haygarth, Arthur (1996) [1862]. Scores & Biographies, Volume 1 (1744–1826). Kennington: Frederick Lillywhite. ISBN 978-19-00592-23-9.
- Warner, Pelham (1946). Lords: 1787–1945. London: Harrap. OCLC 877106024.
