= George Bridges (politician) =

George Bridges (c. 1762 – 13 March 1840) was Lord Mayor of London and a Member of Parliament.

He was the son of George Bridges of Gloucester and set up as a wine merchant in London, becoming a member of a London livery company in 1791. He was a Director of the Grand Junction Waterworks Company from 1814 to his death.

As a member of the Wheelwrights' Company he was elected an Alderman for the City of London in 1811. After two failed attempts he was appointed a Sheriff of London for 1816–17 and then served as Lord Mayor of London for 1819–20.

In 1820 he was elected to serve as the Member of Parliament (MP) for the City of London, sitting until the following general election in 1826.

He died in London in 1840. He had married Frances, the daughter of wine merchant Henry Delamain of Middlesex. He had two sons, one of whom predeceased him. He left an estate in Chigwell to his other son.

Parliament of the United Kingdom
Preceded by Thomas Wilson; Robert Waithman; John Thomas Thorp; Matthew Wood	Member of Parliament for City of London; 1826 – 1826; With: Sir William Curtis, Bt; Thomas Wilson; Matthew Wood	Succeeded by William Thompson; Robert Waithman; William Ward; Matthew Wood
Civic offices
Preceded by John Atkins	Lord Mayor of London; 1819–1820	Succeeded by John Thomas Thorp
