= 1868 City of London by-election =

UK parliamentary by-election

The 1868 City of London by-election was held on 21 December 1868. The by-election was fought due to the incumbent Liberal MP, George Joachim Goschen, becoming President of the Poor Law Board. It was retained by Goschen who was unopposed.
