= John Atkins (MP) =

English politician

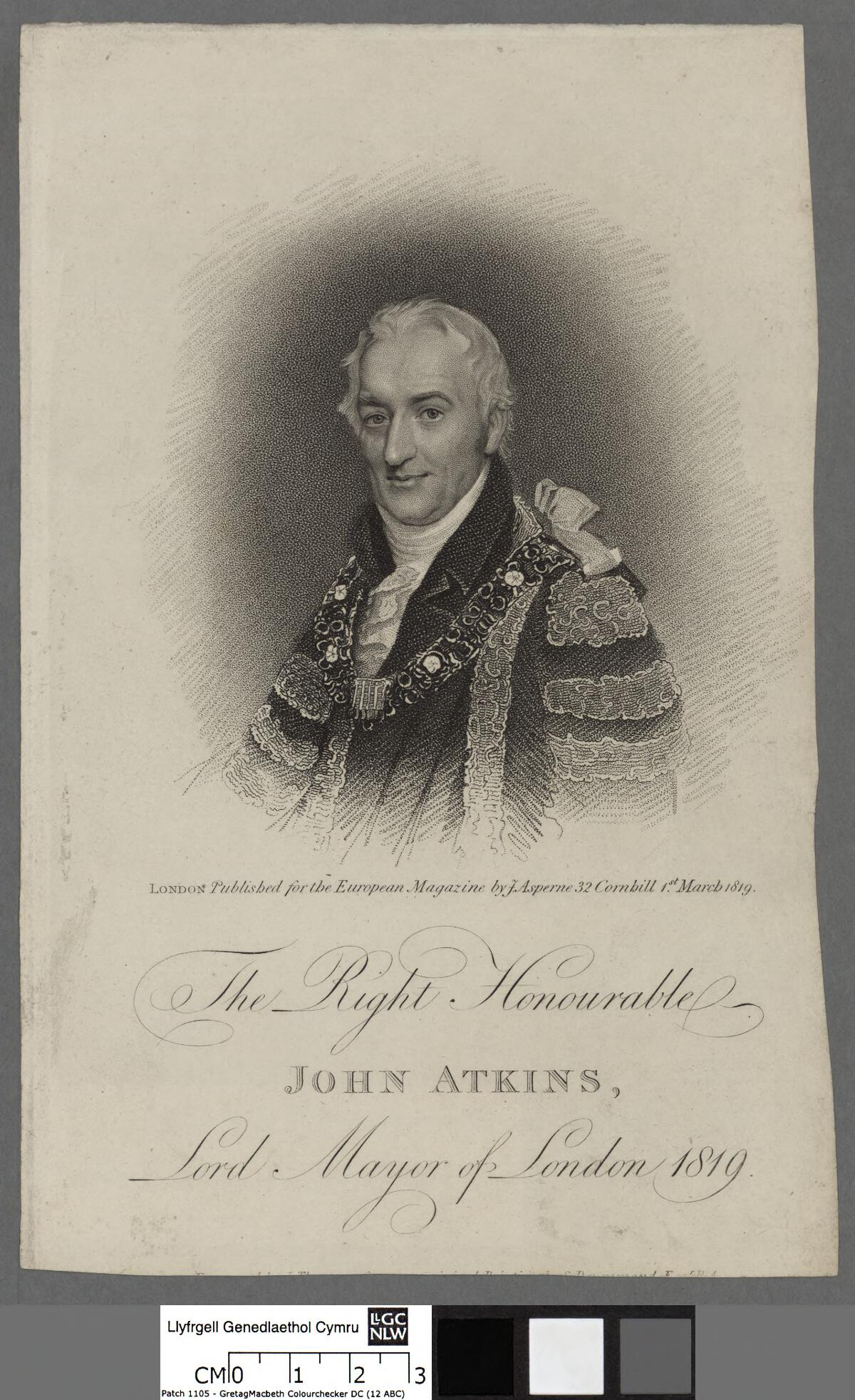
Portrait of right honourable John Atkins, Lord Mayor of London 1819

John Atkins (c. 1754–1838), of Halstead Place, near Sevenoaks, Kent, was an English politician.

He started his career at sea before setting up as a West India merchant with his brother Abram. He was elected an Alderman of London in 1808, served as a Sheriff of London for 1809–1810 and as Lord Mayor of London in 1818–1819.

He was a Member of Parliament (MP) for Arundel in 1802–1806 and 1826–1832, and for the City of London in 1812–1818.

He married twice: firstly Sarah Littell, a spinster with whom he had three sons and two daughters, and secondly Anna Maria, the daughter of the Venerable Andrew Burnaby of Baggrave Hall, Leicestershire, archdeacon of Leicester, with whom he had a further two sons and five daughters.

Parliament of the United Kingdom
Preceded by Viscount Bury; Thomas Read Kemp	Member of Parliament for Arundel; 1826–1832; With: Edward Lombe 1826–1830; Lord Dudley Stuart 1830–1832	Succeeded by Lord Dudley Stuart (representation reduced to one member 1832)
Civic offices
Preceded by Christopher Smith	Lord Mayor of London; 1818–1819	Succeeded by George Bridges
