= William Pickett (alderman) =

English goldsmith and local politician

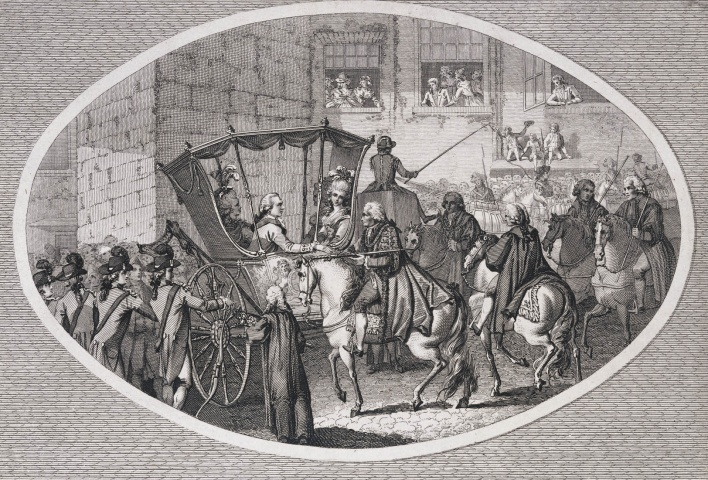
Lord Mayor presenting city sword to His Majesty on his procession to St Paul's, 1789, engraving of the traditional ceremony for 1789, the year in which William Pickett was the Lord Mayor

William Pickett (died 1796) was an English goldsmith and local politician, Lord Mayor of London in 1789.

== Goldsmith ==
Pickett was in business as a goldsmith on Ludgate Hill from 1758, initially a partner in Thead & Pickett. From 1768 to 1777 he traded under his own name. From 1777 Philip Rundell was a partner with him in Pickett & Rundell. In December 1781 his daughter died of burns after her clothes caught fire the previous evening. Pickett had been in the same room, but was unable to react quickly enough.

In 1786 Rundell bought out Pickett, and within about a year the firm became Rundell and Bridge, the dominant London goldsmiths for half a century.

== Politician ==
Pickett was elected alderman of Cornhill Ward in 1783. In London's Court of Alderman he belonged to the Whig group, opposed to the government of William Pitt the younger in the 1790s. In 1787, at the request of local traders, he campaigned for the removal of Temple Bar, but without success. While this scheme for street widening was thrown out, Pickett did succeed with another, near the Strand in the area of St Clement Danes. The resulting new Pickett Street was only called for that name for a short while, the traditional name Strand prevailing. The new development was demolished in 1870, to make way for the Royal Courts of Justice.

A reforming Lord Mayor for 1789, Pickett then stood as a parliamentary candidate, for the City of London, in 1790. Without a political organisation he came bottom of the poll. He stood again in 1796, as an opponent of the sedition bills, with little more success.

== Death ==
Pickett was buried in the family vault in Stoke Newington on 24 December 1796.

== Family ==
He married Elizabeth Pratten. Other sources say he married the daughter of his partner Thead.
