= Lord Dudley Stuart =

British politician

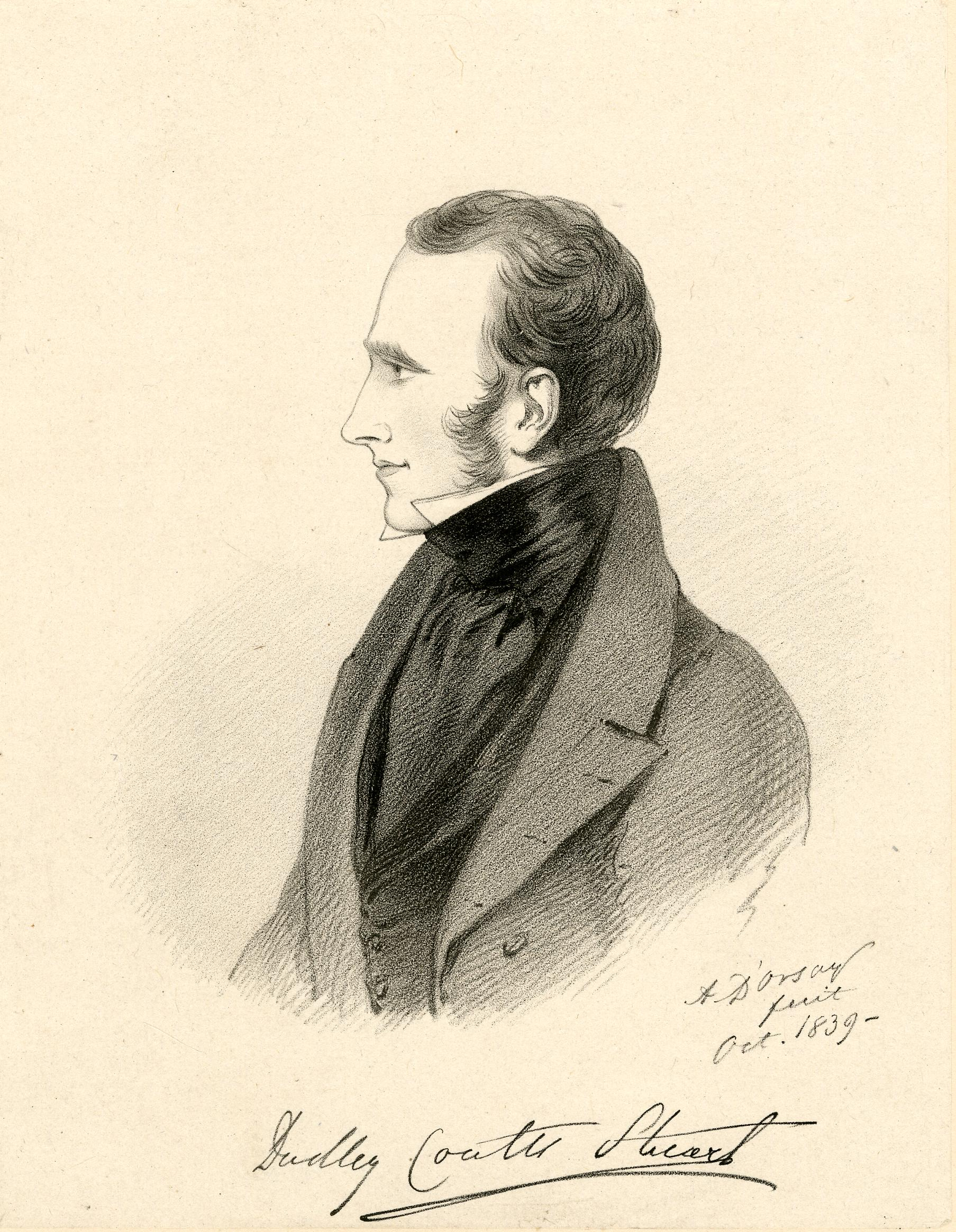
Lord Dudley Stuart

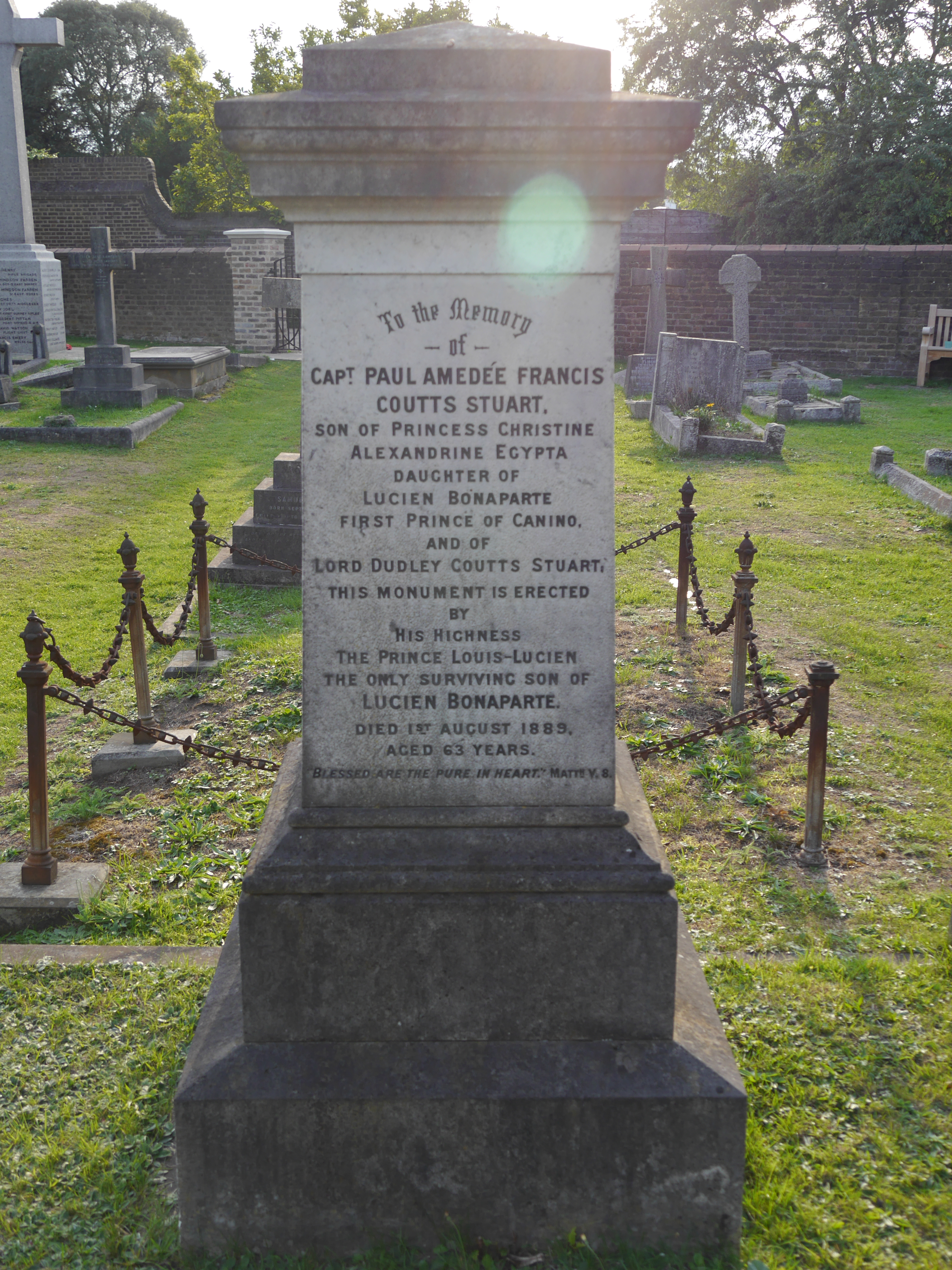
His son's funerary monument, St Peter's Church, Petersham

Lord Dudley Coutts Stuart (11 January 1803 in London – 17 November 1854 in Stockholm) was a British politician. He was the youngest son of John Stuart, 1st Marquess of Bute, and his second wife, Frances Coutts, daughter of the banker Thomas Coutts.

In 1820, he was admitted to Christ Church, Oxford.

On 20 July 1824, he married Princess Christine Bonaparte (1798–1847), daughter of Lucien Bonaparte by his first wife, Christine Boyer, and sister of the Princess Gabrielli. They had one son, Paul Amadeus Francis Coutts Stuart, who died unmarried in 1889.

He was a member of the Whittington Club and the vice-president (and later the president) of the Literary Association of the Friends of Poland.

A Whig and subsequently Liberal, he was a passionate advocate of Polish independence, and sympathetic in general to the cause of the Eastern European peoples against Russia. He received Lajos Kossuth in England after his exile from Hungary. In the election of 1857, Richard Cobden told an anecdote referring to this event:

I will tell you what happened with my knowledge -- it is no breach of confidence to say it. When that illustrious Hungarian was expected in England, after his imprisonment in Turkey, my lamented friend Lord Dudley Stuart -- whose devotion to the cause of these foreign refugees was as unbounded as it was sincere – went down to Southampton to meet Kossuth, and receive him on his arrival. Having to wait a day or two there, and being in the neighbourhood of Broadlands, where Lord Palmerston lives, he went there and saw the noble lord, and received from him a request to bring Kossuth over to Broadlands, to see him. I remember receiveing a letter from Lord Dudley Stuart, announcing to me this piece of intelligence with the greatest glee. He was delighted at the opportunity of taking Kossuth over to the Lord Palmerston; and as soon as he arrived he announced to him the pleasing information. To his astonishment he found Kossuth would not accept it. He would not go near Lord Palmerston -- (cheers); and I have got a letter from Lord Dudley Stuart, asking me to use all my influence with Kossuth to induce him to go and call upon Lord Palmerston. He would not do it; and my answer was this, "You may depend upon it, Kossuth knows a great deal more about Lord Palmerston than you do." (Laughter).

A critic of the Metropolitan Police, he suggested a reduction of the strength of the force in 1853.

Parliament of the United Kingdom
| Preceded by Edward Lombe; John Atkins | Member of Parliament for Arundel; 1830–1837; With: John Atkins 1830–1832 | Succeeded by The Earl of Arundel (representation reduced to one member 1832) |
| Preceded by Sir Benjamin Hall; Sir Charles Napier | Member of Parliament for Marylebone; 1847–1854; With: Sir Benjamin Hall | Succeeded by Sir Benjamin Hall; Viscount Ebrington |
