= William Ward (cricketer, born 1787) =

English financier and cricketer

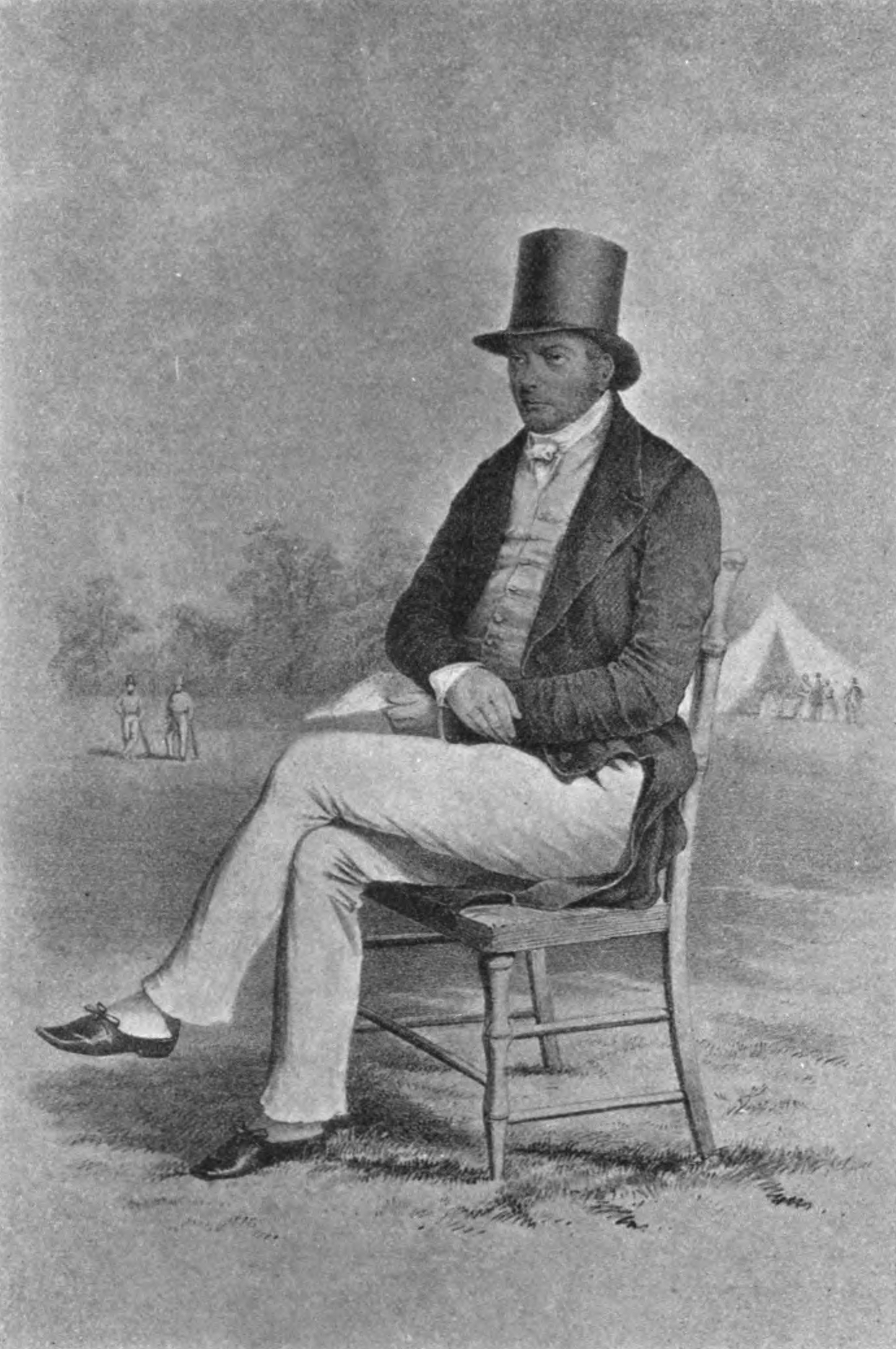
William Ward

William Ward (24 July 1787 – 30 June 1849) was an English financier, and noted cricketer.

== Life ==
Born at Highbury Place, Islington, 24 July 1787, he was the second son of George Ward (died 1829), of Northwood Park, Cowes, a London merchant and large landowner in the Isle of Wight and Hampshire, by his wife Mary (died 1813), daughter of Henry Sampson Woodfall. Robert Plumer Ward was his uncle. He was educated at Winchester College.

Ward was destined for commerce and spent some time at Antwerp in a banking-house. On his return, his father took him into partnership in 1810. In 1817 he was elected a director of the Bank of England, known as an expert on foreign exchanges. In 1819 he gave evidence before the parliamentary committees on the restrictions on payments in cash by the Bank of England.

On 9 June 1826, he became Member of Parliament in the Tory interest for the City of London, and in 1830 at the request of the Duke of Wellington, he acted as chairman of the committee appointed to investigate the affairs of the East India Company, before the opening of the China trade. In 1831, discontented with the spirit of reform, he declined to stand for parliament. In 1835 he presented himself as a candidate, was defeated by the Whigs, and retired from public life.

Ward died on 30 June 1849 in London at Wyndham Place.

== Cricketing career ==
William Ward was a prominent right-handed batsman and an occasional slow lob bowler. His career began in the 1810 English cricket season but it was interrupted by the Napoleonic War until 1816. Ward played until 1845.

His score of 278 for the Marylebone Cricket Club (MCC) v Norfolk at Lord's in 1820 was the highest individual innings in important matches until W. G. Grace scored the first triple-century in August 1876, more than 27 years after Ward's death. The ball used is thought to be the oldest in existence and is kept in the MCC Museum.

In 1825 Thomas Lord was negotiating the sale of his cricket ground as a building estate when Ward stepped in and saved Lord's for cricket. The price was £5,000. He was celebrated in the following anonymous poem.

And of all who frequent the ground named after Lord,
On the list first and foremost should stand Mr Ward.
No man will deny, I am sure, when I say
That he's without rival first bat of the day,
And although he has grown a little too stout,
Even Matthews is bothered at bowling him out.
He's our life blood and soul in this noblest of games,
And yet on our praises he's many more claims;
No pride, although rich, condescending and free,
And a well informed man and a city M.P.

John Nyren dedicated his famous book The Young Cricketer's Tutor to Ward when it appeared in 1833. He described Ward as "the most worthy man of the day to reflect credit upon my choice as a patron".

More recently, Ward was mentioned in The Duckworth Lewis Method's song, "Gentlemen and Players".

A bored young William Ward MP.
Bought Lord's from Thomas Lord
In eighteen twenty five.

The lyric is slightly inaccurate since Ward did not become an MP until 1826.

== Works ==
In 1847 Ward published Remarks on the Monetary Legislation of Great Britain (London), in which he condemned the Coinage Act 1816, which established an exclusive gold standard, and called for a bi-metallic currency.

== Family ==
On 26 April 1811, he married Emily, fifth daughter of Harvey Christian Combe, a London alderman. She died on 24 September 1848, leaving four sons – William George Ward, Henry Ward, Matthew Ward, and Arthur Ward – and two daughters.

Parliament of the United Kingdom
Preceded by Thomas Wilson; Sir William Curtis, Bt; George Bridges; Sir Matthew Wood, Bt	Member of Parliament for the City of London; 1826 – 1831; With: William Thompson; Robert Waithman; Sir Matthew Wood, Bt	Succeeded by William Venables; William Thompson; Robert Waithman; Sir Matthew Wood, Bt
