= City of London (UK Parliament constituency) =

Parliamentary constituency in the United Kingdom, 1885–1950

- Former borough constituency for the House of Commons
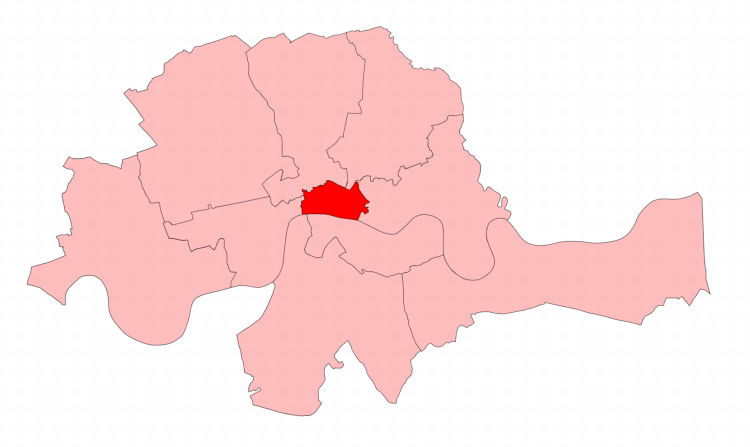
- City of London in the Metropolis 1868–1885
- Borough: City of London

1298–1885
- Seats: 4

1885–1950
- Seats: 2
- Replaced by: Cities of London and Westminster (to form north-eastern part of)

The City of London was a United Kingdom parliamentary constituency. It was a constituency of the House of Commons of the Parliament of England then of the Parliament of Great Britain from 1707 to 1800 and of the Parliament of the United Kingdom from 1801 to 1950.

== Boundaries and boundary changes ==
This borough constituency (or 'parliamentary borough/burgh') consisted of the City of London, which is at the very centre of Greater London. The only change by the Parliamentary Boundaries Act 1832 was to include The Temple.

Bounded south by the Thames, the City adjoins Westminster westward, enfranchised in 1545. In other directions a web of tiny liberties and parishes of diverse size adjoined from medieval times until the 20th century. Most of the population of Middlesex was beyond the city's boundaries. From the 17th century three of four new 'divisions' of Ossulstone Hundred adjoined the city reflecting their relative density – Holborn division and Finsbury division to the north and Tower division to the north-east and the east, all enfranchised in 1832.

London is first known to have been enfranchised and represented in Parliament in 1298. Because it was the most important city in England it received four seats in Parliament instead of the normal two for a constituency. Previous to 1298 from the middle of that century, the intermittent first parliaments, the area's households, officially, could turn to their Middlesex "two knights of the shire" – two members of the Commons – as to their interests in Parliament as the City formed part of the geographic county yet from early times wielded independent administration, its corporation.

The city was represented by four MPs until 1885. From 1868 to 1885, its MPs were elected using limited voting with each voter having only three votes at most. The district was cut to two seats in 1885, and from then its two MPs were elected using plurality block voting. In 1950 the constituency was abolished.

The City of London was originally a densely populated area. Before the Reform Act 1832 the composition of the City electorate was not as democratic as that of some other borough constituencies, such as neighbouring Westminster. The right of election was held by members of the Livery Companies. However the size and wealth of the community meant that it had more voters than most other borough constituencies. Namier and Brooke estimated the size of the City electorate, in the latter part of the 18th century, at about 7,000. Only Westminster had a larger size of electorate.

During the 19th and 20th centuries the metropolitan area of London expanded greatly. The resident population of the City fell. People moved to the new definitively urban expansion and suburbs; businesses moved in. However the City authorities did not want to extend their jurisdiction beyond the traditional "square mile" so the constituency was left unchanged as its resident population fell. By 1900 almost all electors in the City qualified through Livery Company membership and lived outside of the city. The business voters were a type of plural voter which when abolished by the Representation of the People Act 1948 meant the City became immediately under-sized in electorate, akin to the least-worst examples of pre-1832 "rotten and pocket boroughs".

In 1950 the area was merged for parliamentary purposes with the eldest parts of the neighbouring City of Westminster, to form the seat Cities of London and Westminster. The pre-1900 heavily subdivided city became simplified for the 1907-1965 period into one civil parish, before in that year this level of local government complication was taken away. Statutory protection applied between 1986 and 2011 to prevent division of the City between seats:

There shall continue to be a constituency which shall include the whole of the City of London and the name of which shall refer to the City of London"

— Parliamentary Constituencies Act 1986 Sch.2 Rule 3 (repealed, 2011)

== Members of Parliament 1707–1950 ==
See City of London (elections to the Parliament of England) for citizens known to have represented the City in Parliament before 1707

=== Parliaments of Great Britain 1707–1800 ===
From	To	Name	Born	Died
1707	1715	Sir William Withers (T)	c. 1654	31 January 1721
1708	1710	John Ward (W)	c. 1650	12 March 1726
1710	1715	Sir Richard Hoare (T)	8 September 1649	6 January 1719
1710	1714	Sir George Newland (T)	c. 1646	26 March 1714
1710	1715	Sir John Cass (T)	28 February 1661	5 July 1718
1715	1722	Robert Heysham (W)	16 August 1663	25 February 1723
1715	1722	Sir John Ward (W)	c. 1650	12 March 1726
1715	1724	Peter Godfrey (T)	1665	10 November 1724
1715	1722	Sir Thomas Scawen (W)	c. 1650	22 September 1730
1722	1727	Richard Lockwood (T)	1676	30 August 1756
1722	1761	Sir John Barnard (W)	c. 1685	29 August 1764
1722	1727	Francis Child (T)	c. 1684	20 April 1740
1724	1727	Sir Richard Hopkins	...	2 January 1746
1727	1734	Sir John Eyles, Bt (W)	1683	11 March 1745
1727	1741	Micajah Perry (W)	...	22 January 1753
1727	1741	Humphry Parsons (T)	c. 1676	21 March 1741
1734	1741	Robert Willimot (T)	...	19 December 1746
1741	1747	George Heathcote (T)	7 December 1700	7 June 1768
1741	1747	Sir Daniel Lambert (T)	7 September 1685	13 May 1750
1741	1742	Sir Robert Godschall (T)	c. 1692	26 June 1742
1742	1754	Sir William Calvert (W)	c. 1703	3 May 1761
1747	1758	Slingsby Bethell (W)	16 March 1695	1 November 1758
1747	1754	Stephen Janssen (W)	...	1777
1754	1773	Sir Robert Ladbroke (T)	c. 1713	31 October 1773
1754	1770	William Beckford (T)	19 December 1709	21 June 1770
1758	1768	Sir Richard Glyn (T)	13 June 1711	1 January 1773
1761	1774	Hon. Thomas Harley (T)	24 August 1730	1 December 1804
1768	1774	Barlow Trecothick (RW)	c. 1718	28 May 1775
1770	1780	Richard Oliver	7 January 1735	16 April 1784
1773	1784	Frederick Bull (R)	c. 1714	10 January 1784
1774	1780	John Sawbridge (R)	1732	21 February 1795
1774	1781	George Hayley (R)	...	30 August 1781
1780	1780	John Kirkman	1741	19 September 1780
1780	1790	Nathaniel Newnham	c. 1741	26 December 1809
1780	1795	John Sawbridge	1732	21 February 1795
1781	1796	Sir Watkin Lewes	c. 1740	13 July 1821
1784	1793	Brook Watson	11 February 1735	2 October 1807
1790	1800	Sir William Curtis	25 January 1752	18 January 1829
1793	1800	Sir John Anderson, Bt	c. 1735	21 May 1813
1795	1800	William Lushington	18 January 1747	11 September 1823
1796	1800	Harvey Christian Combe	1752	4 July 1818

Note:-

- (a) Expelled

=== Parliament of the United Kingdom from 1801 ===
==== MPs 1801–1885 ====
Election	Member	Party	Member	Party	Member	Party	Member	Party
1801	Sir William Curtis, Bt	Tory	Sir John Anderson, Bt	Tory	William Lushington	Non-partisan	Harvey Christian Combe	Whig
1802	Sir William Curtis, Bt	Tory	Sir John Anderson, Bt	Tory	Sir Charles Price	Tory	Harvey Christian Combe	Whig
1806	Sir William Curtis, Bt	Tory	Sir James Shaw, Bt	Tory	Sir Charles Price	Tory	Harvey Christian Combe	Whig
1812	Sir William Curtis, Bt	Tory	Sir James Shaw, Bt	Tory	John Atkins	Tory	Harvey Christian Combe	Whig
1817 by-election	Sir William Curtis, Bt	Tory	Sir James Shaw, Bt	Tory	John Atkins	Tory	Sir Matthew Wood, Bt	Whig
1818	Thomas Wilson	Tory	Robert Waithman	Whig	John Thomas Thorp	Whig	Sir Matthew Wood, Bt	Whig
1820	Thomas Wilson	Tory	Sir William Curtis, Bt	Tory	George Bridges	Tory	Sir Matthew Wood, Bt	Whig
1826	William Thompson	Tory	Robert Waithman	Whig, Liberal	William Ward	Tory	Sir Matthew Wood, Bt	Whig
1831	William Thompson	Tory	Robert Waithman	Whig, Liberal	William Venables	Whig	Sir Matthew Wood, Bt	Whig
1832	George Grote	Radical	Robert Waithman	Whig, Liberal	Sir John Key, Bt	Whig	Sir Matthew Wood, Bt	Whig
March 1833 by-election	George Grote	Radical	George Lyall	Conservative	Sir John Key, Bt	Whig	Sir Matthew Wood, Bt	Whig
August 1833 by-election	George Grote	Radical	George Lyall	Conservative	William Crawford	Whig	Sir Matthew Wood, Bt	Whig
1835	George Grote	Radical	James Pattison	Whig	William Crawford	Whig	Sir Matthew Wood, Bt	Whig
1841	John Masterman	Conservative	George Lyall	Conservative	Lord John Russell	Whig	Sir Matthew Wood, Bt	Whig
1843 by-election	John Masterman	Conservative	George Lyall	Conservative	Lord John Russell	Whig	James Pattison	Whig
1847	John Masterman	Conservative	Baron Lionel de Rothschild	Whig	Lord John Russell	Whig	James Pattison	Whig
1849 by-election	John Masterman	Conservative	Baron Lionel de Rothschild	Whig	Lord John Russell	Whig	Sir James Duke, Bt	Whig
1857	Robert Wigram Crawford	Whig	Baron Lionel de Rothschild	Whig	Lord John Russell	Whig	Sir James Duke, Bt	Whig
1859	Robert Wigram Crawford	Liberal	Baron Lionel de Rothschild	Liberal	Lord John Russell	Liberal	Sir James Duke, Bt	Liberal
1861 by-election	Robert Wigram Crawford	Liberal	Baron Lionel de Rothschild	Liberal	Western Wood	Liberal	Sir James Duke, Bt	Liberal
1863 by-election	Robert Wigram Crawford	Liberal	Baron Lionel de Rothschild	Liberal	George Goschen	Liberal	Sir James Duke, Bt	Liberal
1865	Robert Wigram Crawford	Liberal	Baron Lionel de Rothschild	Liberal	George Goschen	Liberal	William Lawrence	Liberal
1868	Robert Wigram Crawford	Liberal	Charles Bell	Conservative	George Goschen	Liberal	William Lawrence	Liberal
1869 by-election	Robert Wigram Crawford	Liberal	Baron Lionel de Rothschild	Liberal	George Goschen	Liberal	William Lawrence	Liberal
1874	William Cotton	Conservative	Philip Twells	Conservative	George Goschen	Liberal	John Hubbard	Conservative
1880	William Cotton	Conservative	Sir Robert Fowler, Bt	Conservative	William Lawrence	Liberal	John Hubbard	Conservative
1885	reduced to two seats							

==== MPs 1885–1950 ====
Election	Member	Party	Member	Party
1885	John Hubbard	Conservative	Sir Robert Fowler, Bt	Conservative
1887 by-election	Thomas Charles Baring	Conservative	Sir Robert Fowler, Bt	Conservative
Apr 1891 by-election	Hucks Gibbs	Conservative	Sir Robert Fowler, Bt	Conservative
Jun 1891 by-election	Hucks Gibbs	Conservative	Sir Reginald Hanson, Bt	Conservative
1892	Alban Gibbs	Conservative	Sir Reginald Hanson, Bt	Conservative
1900	Alban Gibbs	Conservative	Sir Joseph Dimsdale (C)	Conservative
1906	Alban Gibbs	Conservative	Sir Edward Clarke	Conservative
Feb 1906 by-election	Arthur Balfour	Conservative	Sir Edward Clarke	Conservative
Jun 1906 by-election	Arthur Balfour	Conservative	Sir Frederick Banbury, Bt	Conservative
1918	Arthur Balfour	Coalition Conservative	Sir Frederick Banbury, Bt	Coalition Conservative
1922 by-election	Edward Grenfell	Conservative	Sir Frederick Banbury, Bt	Coalition Conservative
1922	Edward Grenfell	Conservative	Sir Frederick Banbury, Bt	Conservative
1924 by-election	Edward Grenfell	Conservative	Sir Vansittart Bowater, Bt	Conservative
1935 by-election	Sir Alan Anderson	Conservative	Sir Vansittart Bowater, Bt	Conservative
1938 by-election	Sir Alan Anderson	Conservative	Sir George Broadbridge, Bt	Conservative
1940 by-election	Sir Andrew Duncan	National	Sir George Broadbridge, Bt	Conservative
1945 by-election	Sir Andrew Duncan	National	Ralph Assheton	Conservative
1950	Constituency abolished			

== Elections ==
In multi-member elections the bloc voting system was used. Voters could cast a vote for one to four (or up to two in two-member elections 1885–1950) candidates, as they chose. The leading candidates with the largest number of votes were elected. In 1868 the limited vote was introduced, which restricted an individual elector to using one, two or three votes, in elections to fill four seats.

In by-elections, to fill a single-seat, the first past the post system applied.

After 1832, when registration of voters was introduced, a turnout figure is given for contested elections. In multi-member elections, when the exact number of participating voters is unknown, this is calculated by dividing the number of votes by four (to 1868), three (1868–1885) and two thereafter. To the extent that electors did not use all their votes this will be an underestimate of turnout.

Where a party had more than one candidate in one or both of a pair of successive elections change is calculated for each individual candidate, otherwise change is based on the party vote.

Candidates for whom no party has been identified are classified as non-partisan. The candidate might have been associated with a party or faction in Parliament or consider himself to belong to a particular political tradition. Political parties before the 19th century were not as cohesive or organised as they later became. Contemporary commentators (even the reputed leaders of parties or factions) in the 18th century did not necessarily agree who the party supporters were. The traditional parties, which had arisen in the late 17th century, became increasingly irrelevant to politics in the 18th century (particularly after 1760), although for some contests in some constituencies party labels were still used. It was only towards the end of the century that party labels began to acquire some meaning again, although this process was by no means complete for several more generations.

Sources: The results are based on the History of Parliament Trust's volumes on the House of Commons in various periods from 1715 to 1820, Stooks Smith from 1820 until 1832 and Craig from 1832. Where Stooks Smith gives additional information this is indicated in a note. See references below for further details of these sources.

Dates of general and by-elections from 1660 to 1715 (excluding general elections at which no new MP was returned)

- 27 Mar 1660
- 19 Mar 1661
- 10 Feb 1663
- 17 Feb 1679
- 15 May 1685
- 9 Jan 1689
- 14 May 1689
- 11 Mar 1690
- 2 Mar 1693
- 25 Oct 1695
- 30 Jul 1698
- 1 Feb 1701
- 20 Mar 1701
- 24 Nov 1701
- 18 Aug 1702
- 17 May 1705
- 16 Dec 1707
- 14 May 1708
- 16 Nov 1710

== Parliament of Great Britain election results 1713–1800 ==
1710s –

1720s – 1730s – 1740s – 1750s – 1760s – 1770s – 1780s – 1790s

=== Elections in the 1710s ===
General election 1713: City of London (4 seats)
Party	Candidate	Votes	%
Tory	Richard Hoare	3,842	12.84
Tory	George Newland	3,826	12.78
Tory	John Cass	3,802	12.70
Tory	William Withers	3,763	12.57
Whig	John Ward	3,730	12.46
Whig	Robert Heysham	3,688	12.32
Whig	Peter Godfrey	3,657	12.22
Whig	Thomas Scawen	3,625	12.11

- 6,787 voted. The losing candidates demanded a scrutiny, which did not change the result. (Source: Copy of the pollbook)

General election 29 January 1715: City of London (4 seats)
Party	Candidate	Votes	%	±%
Whig	Robert Heysham	3,499	13.86	N/A
Whig	John Ward	3,475	13.76	N/A
Tory	Peter Godfrey	3,471	13.75	N/A
Whig	Thomas Scawen	3,439	13.62	N/A
Tory	John Cass	2,884	11.42	N/A
Tory	William Withers	2,879	11.40	N/A
Tory	William Stewart	2,828	11.20	N/A
Tory	George Mertinns	2,774	10.99	N/A

=== Elections in the 1720s ===
General election 9 May 1722: City of London (4 seats)
Party	Candidate	Votes	%	±%
Tory	Richard Lockwood	4,235	18.40	+18.40
Whig	John Barnard	3,980	17.29	+17.29
Tory	Peter Godfrey	3,852	16.74	+2.99
Tory	Francis Child	3,784	16.44	+16.44
Tory	Humphrey Parsons	3,593	15.61	+15.61
Whig	Robert Heysham	3,573	15.52	+1.66

- After a scrutiny the members returned were unchanged and vote totals were amended to Lockwood 4,025; Barnard 3,840; Godfrey 3,723; Child 3,575; Heysham 3,441; Parsons 3,393.
- Death of Godfrey 10 November 1724

By-Election 11 December 1724: City of London
Party	Candidate	Votes	%	±%
Nonpartisan	Richard Hopkins	3,332	53.37	+53.37
Nonpartisan	Charles Goodfellow	2,911	46.63	+46.63
Majority		421	6.74	N/A
Nonpartisan gain from Tory		Swing	N/A	

General election 24 November 1727: City of London (4 seats)
Party	Candidate	Votes	%	±%
Whig	John Eyles	3,643	13.71	+13.71
Whig	John Barnard	3,620	13.62	−3.67
Whig	Micajah Perry	3,494	13.15	+13.15
Tory	Humphry Parsons	3,370	12.68	−2.93
Nonpartisan	John Thompson	3,340	12.57	+12.57
Tory	Richard Lockwood	3,086	11.61	−6.79
Nonpartisan	John Williams	3,017	11.35	+11.35
Nonpartisan	Richard Hopkins	3,010	11.32	+11.32

- After a scrutiny the members returned were unchanged and vote totals were amended to Eyles 3,539; Barnard 3,514; Perry 3,396; Parsons 3,255; Thompson 3,244; Lockwood 2,977; Hopkins 2,921; Williams 2,914.

=== Elections in the 1730s ===
General election 10 May 1734: City of London (4 seats)
Party	Candidate	Votes	%	±%
Tory	Humphrey Parsons	3,932	21.92	+9.24
Whig	John Barnard	3,841	21.41	+7.79
Whig	Micajah Perry	3,725	20.76	+7.61
Tory	Robert Willimot	2,984	16.63	+16.63
Tory	John Barber	2,381	13.27	+13.27
Tory	Robert Godschall	1,078	6.01	+6.01

- Note (1734): Poll 7 days (Source: Stooks Smith)

=== Elections in the 1740s ===
General election 13 May 1741: City of London (4 seats)
Party	Candidate	Votes	%	±%
Whig	John Barnard	3,769	21.35	−0.06
Tory	George Heathcote	3,322	18.82	+18.82
Tory	Daniel Lambert	3,217	18.23	+18.23
Tory	Robert Godschall	3,143	17.81	+11.80
Whig	Micajah Perry	1,713	9.71	−11.05
Nonpartisan	Edward Bellamy	1,312	7.43	+7.43
Nonpartisan	Edward Vernon	1,175	6.66	+6.66

- Note (1741): Poll 7 days (Source: Stooks Smith)
- Death of Godschall 26 June 1742

By-Election 13 July 1742: City of London
Party	Candidate	Votes	%	±%
Whig	William Calvert	Unopposed	N/A	N/A
Whig gain from Tory		Swing	N/A	

General election 10 July 1747: City of London (4 seats)
Party	Candidate	Votes	%	±%
Whig	William Calvert	3,806	20.85	+20.85
Whig	John Barnard	3,781	20.71	−0.64
Whig	Slingsby Bethell	3,146	17.23	+17.23
Whig	Stephen Janssen	3,008	16.48	+16.48
Tory	Daniel Lambert	2,530	13.86	−4.37
Tory	Robert Ladbroke	1,986	10.88	+10.88

=== Elections in the 1750s ===
General election 7 May 1754: City of London (4 seats)
Party	Candidate	Votes	%	±%
Whig	John Barnard	3,553	18.96	−1.75
Whig	Slingsby Bethell	3,547	18.93	+1.70
Tory	Robert Ladbroke	3,390	18.09	+7.21
Tory	William Beckford	2,941	15.70	+15.70
Tory	Richard Glyn	2,655	14.17	+14.17
Whig	William Calvert	2,650	14.14	−6.71

- Note (1754): Poll 7 days, 5,931 voted (Source: Stooks Smith)
- Death of Bethell 1 November 1758

By-Election 30 November 1758: City of London
Party	Candidate	Votes	%	±%
Tory	Richard Glyn	Unopposed	N/A	N/A
Tory gain from Whig		Swing	N/A	

=== Elections in the 1760s ===
General election 4 April 1761: City of London (4 seats)
Party	Candidate	Votes	%	±%
Tory	Robert Ladbroke	4,306	23.36	+5.27
Tory	Thomas Harley	3,983	21.61	+21.61
Tory	William Beckford	3,663	19.87	+4.17
Tory	Richard Glyn	3,285	17.83	+3.66
Whig	Samuel Fludyer	3,193	17.32	+17.32

- Note (1761): Poll 7 days (Source: Stooks Smith)

General election 25 March 1768: City of London (4 seats)
Party	Candidate	Votes	%	±%
Pro-Government	Thomas Harley	3,729	19.02	−2.59
Independent Opposition	Robert Ladbroke	3,678	18.76	−4.60
Nonpartisan	William Beckford	3,402	17.35	−2.52
Rockingham Whigs	Barlow Trecothick	2,957	15.08	+15.08
Nonpartisan	Richard Glyn	2,823	14.40	−3.43
Nonpartisan	John Paterson	1,769	9.02	+9.02
Radical	John Wilkes	1,247	6.36	+6.36

=== Elections in the 1770s ===
- Death of Beckford 21 June 1770

By-Election 11 July 1770: City of London
Party	Candidate	Votes	%	±%
Radical	Richard Oliver	Unopposed	N/A	N/A
Nonpartisan hold		Swing	N/A	

- Death of Ladbroke 31 October 1773

By-Election 23 December 1773: City of London
Party	Candidate	Votes	%	±%
Radical	Frederick Bull	2,695	52.07	N/A
Nonpartisan	John Roberts	2,481	47.93	N/A
Majority		214	4.14	N/A
Nonpartisan hold		Swing	N/A	

General election 18 October 1774: City of London (4 seats)
Party	Candidate	Votes	%	±%
Radical	John Sawbridge	3,456	17.8	N/A
Radical	George Hayley	3,390	17.5	N/A
Independent Radical/Opposition	Richard Oliver	3,354	17.3	New
Radical	Frederick Bull	3,096	15.9	N/A
Nonpartisan	William Baker	2,802	14.4	N/A
Nonpartisan	Brass Crosby	1,913	9.9	N/A
Nonpartisan	John Roberts	1,398	7.2	N/A

=== Elections in the 1780s ===
General election 19 September 1780: City of London (4 seats)
Party	Candidate	Votes	%	±%
Nonpartisan	George Hayley	4,062	21.63	+4.16
Nonpartisan	John Kirkman	3,804	20.26	N/A
Nonpartisan	Frederick Bull	3,150	16.77	+0.83
Nonpartisan	Nathaniel Newnham	3,036	16.17	N/A
Nonpartisan	John Sawbridge	2,957	15.75	−2.06
Nonpartisan	Richard Clarke	1,771	9.43	N/A

- Death of Kirkman 19 September 1780

By-Election 28 November 1780: City of London
Party	Candidate	Votes	%	±%
Nonpartisan	John Sawbridge	Unopposed	N/A	N/A
Nonpartisan hold		Swing	N/A	

- Death of Hayley 30 August 1781

By-Election 2 October 1781: City of London
Party	Candidate	Votes	%	±%
Nonpartisan	Watkin Lewes	2,685	53.05	N/A
Nonpartisan	Richard Clarke	2,387	46.95	+37.50
Majority		309	6.10	N/A
Nonpartisan hold		Swing	N/A	

- Death of Bull 10 January 1784

By-Election 26 January 1784: City of London
Party	Candidate	Votes	%	±%
Nonpartisan	Brook Watson	2,097	66.78	N/A
Nonpartisan	Brass Crosby	1,043	33.22	N/A
Majority		1,054	33.56	N/A
Nonpartisan hold		Swing	N/A	

- Note (1784 be): Poll 3 days (Source: Stooks Smith)

General election 7 May 1784: City of London (4 seats)
Party	Candidate	Votes	%	±%
Nonpartisan	Brook Watson	4,776	24.19	N/A
Nonpartisan	Watkin Lewes	4,541	23.00	N/A
Nonpartisan	Nathaniel Newnham	4,467	22.56	+6.49
Nonpartisan	John Sawbridge	2,812	14.24	−1.51
Nonpartisan	Richard Atkinson	2,803	14.20	N/A
Nonpartisan	Samuel Smith	286	1.50	N/A
Nonpartisan	William Pitt	56	0.31	N/A

- Note (1784): Poll 7 days. Mr Pitt was returned on the show of hands, but retired before the poll. (Source: Stooks Smith)

=== Elections in the 1790s ===
General election 26 June 1790: City of London (4 seats)
Party	Candidate	Votes	%	±%
Nonpartisan	William Curtis	4,346	22.16	+22.16
Nonpartisan	Brook Watson	4,101	20.91	−3.28
Nonpartisan	Watkin Lewes	3,747	19.10	−3.90
Nonpartisan	John Sawbridge	3,686	18.79	+4.55
Nonpartisan	Nathaniel Newnham	2,670	13.61	−9.02
Nonpartisan	William Pickett	1,064	5.42	+5.42

- Note (1790): Poll 7 days (Source: Stooks Smith)
- Appointment of Watson as Commissary General

By-Election 6 March 1793: City of London
Party	Candidate	Votes	%	±%
Nonpartisan	John Anderson	Unopposed	N/A	N/A
Nonpartisan hold		Swing	N/A	

- Note (1793): Mr Newnham was a candidate, but declined to go to the poll. (Source: Stooks Smith)
- Death of Sawbridge 21 February 1795

By-Election 12 March 1795: City of London
Party	Candidate	Votes	%	±%
Nonpartisan	William Lushington	2,334	59.94	+59.94
Nonpartisan	Harvey Christian Combe	1,560	40.06	+40.06
Majority		774	19.88	N/A
Nonpartisan hold		Swing	N/A	

- Note (1795): Poll 3 days (Source: Stooks Smith)

General election 2 June 1796: City of London (4 seats)
Party	Candidate	Votes	%	±%
Nonpartisan	William Lushington	4,379	20.97	+20.97
Nonpartisan	William Curtis	4,313	20.66	−1.50
Nonpartisan	Harvey Christian Combe	3,865	18.51	+18.51
Nonpartisan	John Anderson	3,170	15.18	+15.18
Nonpartisan	William Pickett	2,795	13.39	+7.97
Nonpartisan	Watkin Lewes	2,356	11.28	−7.82

- Note (1796): Poll 7 days (Source: Stooks Smith)

== Parliament of the United Kingdom election results (4 seats) 1801–1885 ==
1800s –

1810s – 1820s – 1830s – 1840s – 1850s – 1860s – 1870s – 1880s

=== Elections in the 1800s ===
General election 6 July 1802: City of London (4 seats)
Party	Candidate	Votes	%	±%
Whig	Harvey Christian Combe	3,377	23.91	+5.40
Tory	Charles Price	3,236	22.91	+22.91
Tory	William Curtis	2,989	21.16	+0.50
Tory	John Anderson	2,387	16.90	+1.72
Whig	Benjamin Travers	1,371	9.71	+9.71
Nonpartisan	Watkin Lewes	652	4.62	−6.66
Nonpartisan	William Lushington	113	0.80	−20.17

- Note (1802): Poll 7 days (Source: Stooks Smith)

General election 31 October 1806: City of London (4 seats)
Party	Candidate	Votes	%	±%
Whig	Harvey Christian Combe	2,294	24.11	+0.20
Tory	James Shaw	2,275	23.91	+23.91
Tory	Charles Price	2,254	23.69	+0.78
Tory	William Curtis	2,213	23.26	+2.10
Tory	John Atkins	314	3.30	+3.30
Whig	John Hankey	164	1.72	+1.72

- Note (1806): Poll 3 days (Source: Stooks Smith)

General election 1807: City of London (4 seats)
Party	Candidate	Votes	%	±%
Tory	Charles Price	3,117	26.30	+2.61
Tory	William Curtis	3,059	25.81	+2.55
Tory	James Shaw	2,863	24.15	+0.24
Whig	Harvey Christian Combe	2,588	21.83	−2.28
Whig	John Hankey	226	1.91	+0.19

- Note (1807): Mr Hankey died on the afternoon of the first day's polling. All the candidates voted for him. (Source: Stooks Smith)

=== Elections in the 1810s ===
General election 5 October 1812: City of London (4 seats)
Party	Candidate	Votes	%	±%
Whig	Harvey Christian Combe	5,125	22.85	+1.02
Tory	William Curtis	4,577	20.40	−5.41
Tory	James Shaw	4,082	18.20	−5.95
Tory	John Atkins	3,645	16.25	+16.25
Whig	Robert Waithman	2,622	11.69	+11.69
Whig	Matthew Wood	2,373	10.58	+10.58
Nonpartisan	Claudius Hunter	8	0.04	+0.04

- Note (1812): Mr Hunter, the Lord Mayor of the City of London, retired before the poll. (Source: Stooks Smith)
- Resignation of Combe

By-Election 10 June 1817: City of London
Party	Candidate	Votes	%	±%
Whig	Matthew Wood	Unopposed	N/A	N/A
Whig hold				

General election 16 June 1818: City of London (4 seats)
Party	Candidate	Votes	%	±%
Whig	Matthew Wood	5,700	22.38	+11.80
Tory	Thomas Wilson	4,829	18.96	+18.96
Whig	Robert Waithman	4,693	18.43	+6.74
Whig	John Thorp	4,335	17.02	+17.02
Tory	William Curtis	4,224	16.58	−3.82
Tory	John Atkins	1,688	6.63	−9.62

- Note (1818): Poll 7 days, 7,978 voted. (Source: Stooks Smith)

=== Elections in the 1820s ===
General election 7 March 1820: City of London (4 seats)
Party	Candidate	Votes	%	±%
Whig	Matthew Wood	5,370	19.22	−3.16
Tory	Thomas Wilson	5,358	19.18	+0.22
Tory	William Curtis	4,908	17.57	+0.99
Tory	George Bridges	4,259	15.25	+15.25
Whig	Robert Waithman	4,119	14.74	−3.69
Whig	John Thorp	3,921	14.04	−2.98

- Note (1820): Poll 7 days (Source: Stooks Smith)

General election 9 June 1826: City of London (4 seats)
Party	Candidate	Votes	%	±%
Tory	William Thompson	6,483	24.71	+24.71
Whig	Robert Waithman	5,042	19.21	+4.47
Tory	William Ward	4,991	19.02	+19.02
Whig	Matthew Wood	4,880	18.60	−0.62
Whig	William Venables	4,514	17.20	+17.20
Whig	Alderman Garrett	330	1.26	+1.26

- Note (1826): Poll 7 days. 8,639 voted. Alderman Garrett was proposed without his consent. (Source: Stooks Smith)

=== Elections in the 1830s ===
General election 1830: City of London (4 seats)
Party	Candidate	Votes	%	±%
Tory	William Thompson	Unopposed		
Whig	Robert Waithman	Unopposed		
Tory	William Ward	Unopposed		
Whig	Matthew Wood	Unopposed		
Tory hold				
Whig hold				
Tory hold				
Whig hold				

General election 29 April 1831: City of London (4 seats)
Party	Candidate	Votes	%	±%
Tory	William Thompson	Unopposed		
Whig	Robert Waithman	Unopposed		
Whig	Matthew Wood	Unopposed		
Whig	William Venables	Unopposed		
Tory hold				
Whig hold				
Whig hold				
Whig gain from Tory				

General election 12 December 1832: City of London (4 seats)
Party	Candidate	Votes	%	±%
Radical	George Grote	8,412	23.9	N/A
Whig	Matthew Wood	7,488	21.3	N/A
Whig	Robert Waithman	7,452	21.2	N/A
Whig	John Key	6,136	17.4	N/A
Tory	George Lyall	5,112	14.5	N/A
Radical	Michael Scales (politician)	569	1.6	N/A
Turnout		11,500	61.9	N/A
Registered electors		18,584		
Majority		3,300	9.4	N/A
Radical gain from Tory		Swing	N/A	
Majority		1,024	2.9	N/A
Whig hold		Swing	N/A	
Whig hold		Swing	N/A	
Whig hold		Swing	N/A	

- Death of Waithman 6 February 1833

By-election, 27 February 1833: City of London
Party	Candidate	Votes	%	±%
Tory	George Lyall	5,569	55.2	+40.7
Whig	William Venables	4,527	44.8	−15.1
Majority		1,042	10.4	N/A
Turnout		10,096	54.3	−7.6
Registered electors		18,584		
Tory gain from Whig		Swing	+27.9	

- Resignation of Key by accepting the office of Steward of the Chiltern Hundreds

By-election, 12 August 1833: City of London
Party	Candidate	Votes	%	±%
Whig	William Crawford	4,041	66.8	+6.9
Tory	Francis Kemble	2,004	33.2	+18.7
Majority		2,037	33.6	+30.7
Turnout		6,045	32.5	−29.4
Registered electors		18,584		
Whig hold		Swing	−5.9	

General election 5 January 1835: City of London (4 seats)
Party	Candidate	Votes	%	±%
Whig	Matthew Wood	6,418	16.9	−4.4
Whig	James Pattison	6,050	15.9	−5.3
Whig	William Crawford	5,961	15.7	−1.7
Radical	George Grote	5,955	15.6	−8.3
Conservative	George Lyall	4,599	12.1	+7.3
Conservative	William Ward	4,560	12.0	+7.2
Conservative	Thomas Wilson	4,514	11.9	+7.1
Turnout		11,456	62.6	−0.7
Registered electors		18,288		
Majority		6	0.1	−2.8
Whig hold		Swing	−4.9	
Whig hold		Swing	−5.4	
Whig hold		Swing	−3.6	
Majority		1,356	3.5	−5.9
Radical hold		Swing	−6.9	

General election 1837: City of London (4 seats)
Party	Candidate	Votes	%	±%
Whig	Matthew Wood	6,517	21.4	+4.5
Whig	William Crawford	6,071	20.0	+4.3
Whig	James Pattison	6,070	20.0	+4.1
Radical	George Grote	5,879	19.3	+3.7
Conservative	John Hinde Palmer	5,873	19.3	−16.7
Turnout		11,932	60.6	−2.0
Registered electors		19,678		
Majority		191	0.7	+0.6
Whig hold		Swing	+4.3	
Whig hold		Swing	+4.2	
Whig hold		Swing	+4.1	
Majority		6	0.0	−3.5
Radical hold		Swing	+3.9	

=== Elections in the 1840s ===
General election 28 June 1841: City of London (4 seats)
Party	Candidate	Votes	%	±%
Conservative	John Masterman	6,339	12.8	+8.0
Whig	Matthew Wood	6,315	12.8	−8.6
Conservative	George Lyall	6,290	12.7	+7.9
Whig	John Russell	6,221	12.6	N/A
Conservative	Matthias Wolverley Attwood	6,212	12.5	+7.7
Whig	James Pattison	6,070	12.3	−7.7
Whig	William Crawford	6,065	12.2	−7.8
Conservative	John Pirie	6,017	12.1	+7.3
Turnout		12,383 (est)	64.9 (est)	+4.3
Registered electors		19,068		
Majority		269	0.5	N/A
Conservative gain from Radical		Swing	N/A	
Majority		25	0.0	−0.7
Whig hold		Swing	−8.2	
Majority		225	0.5	N/A
Conservative gain from Whig		Swing	+8.0	
Majority		9	0.1	−0.6
Whig hold		Swing	N/A	

- Death of Wood 25 September 1843

By-election, 20 October 1843: City of London
Party	Candidate	Votes	%	±%
Whig	James Pattison	6,532	50.6	+0.7
Conservative	Thomas Charles Baring	6,367	49.4	−0.7
Majority		165	1.2	+1.2
Turnout		12,899	64.4	−0.5
Registered electors		20,030		
Whig hold		Swing	+0.7	

- Appointment of Russell as Prime Minister and First Lord of the Treasury

By-election, 8 July 1846: City of London
Party	Candidate	Votes	%	±%
Whig	John Russell	Unopposed		
Whig hold				

General election 28 July 1847: City of London (4 seats)
Party	Candidate	Votes	%	±%
Whig	John Russell	7,137	14.3	+1.7
Whig	James Pattison	7,030	14.1	+1.8
Whig	Lionel de Rothschild	6,792	13.6	+0.8
Conservative	John Masterman	6,722	13.5	+0.7
Whig	George Larpent	6,719	13.5	+1.3
Conservative	Robert Cooper Lee Bevan	5,268	10.5	−2.2
Conservative	John Johnson (London candidate)	5,069	10.1	−2.4
Conservative	James William Freshfield	4,704	9.4	−2.7
Radical	William Payne	513	1.0	New
Turnout		13,437	67.0	+2.1
Registered electors		20,057		
Majority		70	0.1	+0.1
Whig hold		Swing	+1.7	
Whig hold		Swing	+1.7	
Whig gain from Conservative		Swing	+1.2	
Majority		3	0.0	—
Conservative hold		Swing	−0.4	

- Note (1847): De Rothschild and Payne were classified as Reformer candidates. (Source: Stooks Smith)
- Resignation of de Rothschild to seek re-election after rejection of the Jewish Disabilities Bill

By-election, 4 July 1849: City of London
Party	Candidate	Votes	%	±%
Whig	Lionel de Rothschild	6,017	68.1	+12.6
Conservative	John Manners	2,814	31.9	−11.6
Majority		3,203	36.2	+36.1
Turnout		8,831	41.5	−25.5
Registered electors		21,270		
Whig hold		Swing	+12.1	

- Note (1849): De Rothschild was classified as a Reformer candidate. (Source: Stooks Smith)
- Death of Pattison June 1849

By-election, 27 July 1849: City of London
Party	Candidate	Votes	%	±%
Whig	James Duke	Unopposed		
Whig hold				

=== Elections in the 1850s ===
General election 1852: City of London (4 seats)
Party	Candidate	Votes	%	±%
Conservative	John Masterman	6,195	24.3	−19.2
Whig	John Russell	5,537	21.7	+7.4
Whig	James Duke	5,270	20.7	+6.6
Whig	Lionel de Rothschild	4,748	18.6	+5.0
Whig	Robert Wigram Crawford	3,765	14.8	+1.3
Majority		658	2.6	+2.6
Turnout		11,025 (est)	53.2 (est)	−13.8
Registered electors		20,728		
Conservative hold		Swing	−19.8	
Whig hold		Swing	+6.1	
Whig hold		Swing	+5.7	
Whig hold		Swing	+4.9	

- Appointment of Russell as Secretary of State for Foreign Affairs

By-Election 3 January 1853: City of London
Party	Candidate	Votes	%	±%
Whig	John Russell	Unopposed		
Whig hold				

- Appointment of Russell as Lord President of the Council

By-Election 14 June 1854: City of London
Party	Candidate	Votes	%	±%
Whig	John Russell	Unopposed		
Whig hold				

- Appointment of Russell as Secretary of State for the Colonies

By-Election 3 March 1855: City of London
Party	Candidate	Votes	%	±%
Whig	John Russell	Unopposed		
Whig hold				

General election 27 March 1857: City of London (4 seats)
Party	Candidate	Votes	%	±%
Whig	James Duke	6,664	22.4	+1.7
Whig	Lionel de Rothschild	6,398	21.5	+2.9
Whig	John Russell	6,308	21.2	−0.5
Whig	Robert Wigram Crawford	5,808	19.6	+4.8
Whig	Raikes Currie	4,519	15.2	N/A
Majority		1,289	4.4	N/A
Turnout		7,424 (est)	38.8 (est)	−14.4
Registered electors		19,115		
Whig hold		Swing	N/A	
Whig hold		Swing	N/A	
Whig hold		Swing	N/A	
Whig gain from Conservative		Swing	N/A	

- Resignation of de Rothschild to seek re-election after rejection of the Jewish Disabilities Bill

By-Election 28 July 1857: City of London
Party	Candidate	Votes	%	±%
Whig	Lionel de Rothschild	Unopposed		
Whig hold				

General election 1859: City of London (4 seats)
Party	Candidate	Votes	%	±%
Liberal	James Duke	Unopposed		
Liberal	Lionel de Rothschild	Unopposed		
Liberal	John Russell	Unopposed		
Liberal	Robert Wigram Crawford	Unopposed		
Registered electors		19,026		
Liberal hold				
Liberal hold				
Liberal hold				
Liberal hold				

- Appointment of Russell as Secretary of State for Foreign Affairs

By-Election 27 June 1859: City of London
Party	Candidate	Votes	%	±%
Liberal	John Russell	Unopposed		
Liberal hold				

=== Elections in the 1860s ===
- Creation of Russell as the 1st Earl Russell

By-election, 29 July 1861: City of London
Party	Candidate	Votes	%	±%
Liberal	Western Wood	5,747	52.3	N/A
Conservative	William Cubitt	5,241	47.7	New
Majority		506	4.6	N/A
Turnout		10,988	59.2	N/A
Registered electors		18,562		
Liberal hold		Swing	N/A	

- Death of Wood 17 May 1863

By-election, 2 June 1863: City of London
Party	Candidate	Votes	%	±%
Liberal	George Goschen	Unopposed		
Liberal hold				

General election 10 July 1865: City of London (4 seats)
Party	Candidate	Votes	%	±%
Liberal	George Goschen	7,102	19.9	N/A
Liberal	Robert Wigram Crawford	7,086	19.9	N/A
Liberal	William Lawrence	6,637	18.6	N/A
Liberal	Lionel de Rothschild	6,525	18.3	N/A
Conservative	George Lyall	4,197	11.8	N/A
Conservative	Robert Fowler	4,086	11.5	N/A
Majority		2,328	6.5	N/A
Turnout		10,529 (est)	67.8 (est)	N/A
Registered electors		15,534		
Liberal hold		Swing	N/A	
Liberal hold		Swing	N/A	
Liberal hold		Swing	N/A	
Liberal hold		Swing	N/A	

- Appointment of Goschen as Chancellor of the Duchy of Lancaster

By-election, 26 February 1866: City of London
Party	Candidate	Votes	%	±%
Liberal	George Goschen	Unopposed		
Liberal hold				

In 1868 the limited vote was introduced, which restricted an individual elector to using one, two or three votes, in elections of the City of London's four MPs.

General election 16 November 1868: City of London (4 seats)
Party	Candidate	Votes	%	±%
Liberal	George Goschen	6,520	15.1	−4.8
Liberal	Robert Wigram Crawford	6,258	14.5	−5.4
Liberal	William Lawrence	6,215	14.4	−4.2
Conservative	Charles Bell	6,130	14.2	+2.4
Conservative	Philip Twells	6,099	14.1	+2.6
Conservative	Sills John Gibbons	6,013	13.9	N/A
Liberal	Lionel de Rothschild	5,995	13.9	−4.4
Turnout		12,328 (est)	61.1 (est)	−6.7
Registered electors		20,185		
Majority		85	0.2	−6.3
Liberal hold		Swing	−3.7	
Liberal hold		Swing	−4.0	
Liberal hold		Swing	−4.6	
Majority		135	0.3	N/A
Conservative gain from Liberal		Swing	+2.5	

- Note (1868): Craig refers to R.N. de Rothschild, but Stenton confirms the candidate was L.N. de Rothschild
- Appointment of Goschen as President of the Poor Law Board

By-election, 21 December 1868: City of London
Party	Candidate	Votes	%	±%
Liberal	George Goschen	Unopposed		
Liberal hold				

- Death of Bell 9 February 1869

By-election, 22 February 1869: City of London
Party	Candidate	Votes	%	±%
Liberal	Lionel de Rothschild	Unopposed		
Liberal gain from Conservative				

=== Elections in the 1870s ===
The limited vote was in use, which restricted an individual elector to using one, two or three votes, in elections of the City of London's four MPs.

General election 10 February 1874: City of London (4 seats)
Party	Candidate	Votes	%	±%
Conservative	William Cotton	8,397	18.7	+4.5
Conservative	Philip Twells	8,330	18.6	+4.5
Conservative	John Hubbard	8,210	18.3	+4.4
Liberal	George Goschen	6,787	15.1	0.0
Liberal	William Lawrence	6,654	14.8	+0.4
Liberal	Lionel de Rothschild	6,490	14.5	+0.6
Majority		1,423	3.2	+2.9
Turnout		14,956 (est)	66.1 (est)	+5.0
Registered electors		22,626		
Conservative hold		Swing	+2.1	
Conservative gain from Liberal		Swing	+2.1	
Conservative gain from Liberal		Swing	+2.0	
Liberal hold		Swing	−2.2	

- Note (1874): Craig refers to R.N. de Rothschild, but Stenton confirms the candidate was L.N. de Rothschild

=== Elections in the 1880s ===
General election 3 April 1880: City of London (4 seats)
Party	Candidate	Votes	%	±%
Conservative	William Cotton	10,326	21.3	+2.6
Conservative	Robert Fowler	10,274	21.2	+2.6
Conservative	John Hubbard	10,256	21.2	+2.9
Liberal	William Lawrence	5,950	12.3	−2.5
Liberal	Richard Martin	5,837	12.1	−3.0
Liberal	Walter Morrison	5,743	11.9	−2.6
Majority		4,306	8.9	+5.7
Turnout		16,129 (est)	67.1 (est)	+1.0
Registered electors		24,042		
Conservative hold		Swing	+2.6	
Conservative hold		Swing	+2.8	
Conservative hold		Swing	+2.8	
Liberal hold		Swing	−2.6	

- Reduction of constituency to two seats, in the 1885 redistribution

== Parliament of the United Kingdom election results (2 seats) 1885–1950 ==
1880s –

1890s – 1900s – 1910s – 1920s – 1930s – 1940s

=== Elections in the 1880s ===
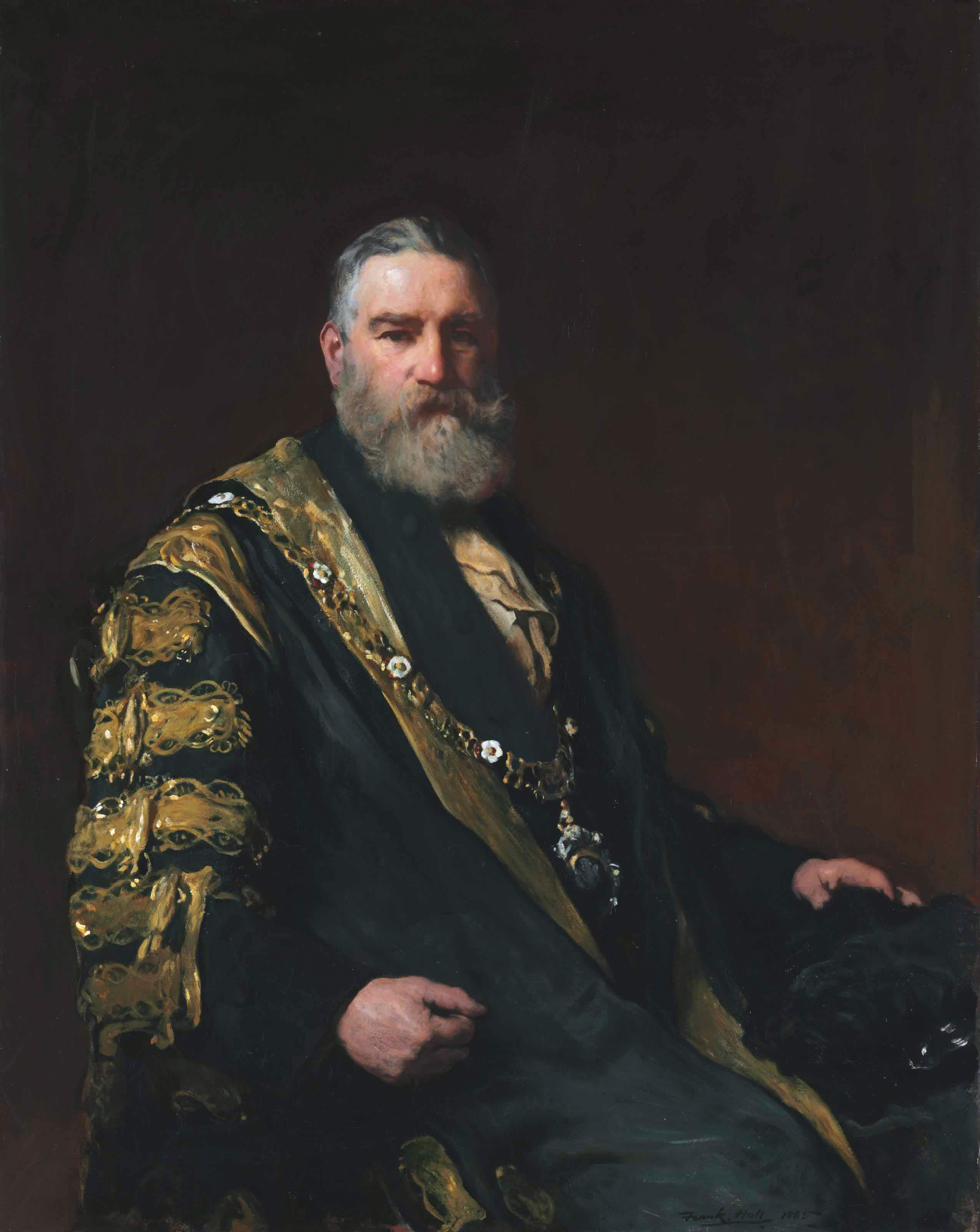
Fowler

General election 1885: City of London (2 seats)
Party	Candidate	Votes	%	±%
Conservative	Robert Fowler	12,827	38.8	+17.6
Conservative	John Hubbard	8,802	26.7	+5.5
Liberal	Stephen Low	5,817	17.6	+5.3
Ind. Conservative	William Cotton	5,563	16.9	−4.4
Turnout		33,009	68.6	+1.5 (est)
Majority		2,985	9.1	+0.2
Registered electors		29,152		
Conservative hold		Swing	+7.5	
Conservative hold		Swing	+1.4	

General election 1886: City of London (2 seats)
Party	Candidate	Votes	%	±%
Conservative	Robert Fowler	Unopposed		
Conservative	John Hubbard	Unopposed		
Conservative hold				

Fowler was elevated to the peerage, becoming Lord Addington, requiring a by-election.

By-Election 27 July 1887: City of London
Party	Candidate	Votes	%	±%
Conservative	Thomas Charles Baring	Unopposed		
Conservative hold				

=== Elections in the 1890s ===
Baring's death caused a by-election.

By-Election 18 April 1891: City of London
Party	Candidate	Votes	%	±%
Conservative	Hucks Gibbs	Unopposed		
Conservative hold				

Fowler's death caused a by-election.

By-Election 3 June 1891: City of London
Party	Candidate	Votes	%	±%
Conservative	Reginald Hanson	Unopposed		
Conservative hold				

General election 1892: City of London (2 seats)
Party	Candidate	Votes	%	±%
Conservative	Reginald Hanson	10,556	44.0	N/A
Conservative	Alban Gibbs	9,258	38.5	N/A
Ind. Conservative	James Ritchie (Conservative politician)	4,207	17.5	New
Majority		5,051	21.0	N/A
Turnout		13,490 (est)	41.3	N/A
Registered electors		32,664		
Conservative hold				
Conservative hold				

General election 1895: City of London (2 seats)
Party	Candidate	Votes	%	±%
Conservative	Alban Gibbs	Unopposed		
Conservative	Reginald Hanson	Unopposed		
Conservative hold				
Conservative hold				

=== Elections in the 1900s ===
General election 1900: City of London (2 seats)
Party	Candidate	Votes	%	±%
Conservative	Alban Gibbs	Unopposed		
Conservative	Joseph Dimsdale	Unopposed		
Conservative hold				
Conservative hold				

1904 City of London by-election
Party	Candidate	Votes	%	±%
Conservative	Alban Gibbs	Unopposed		
Conservative hold				

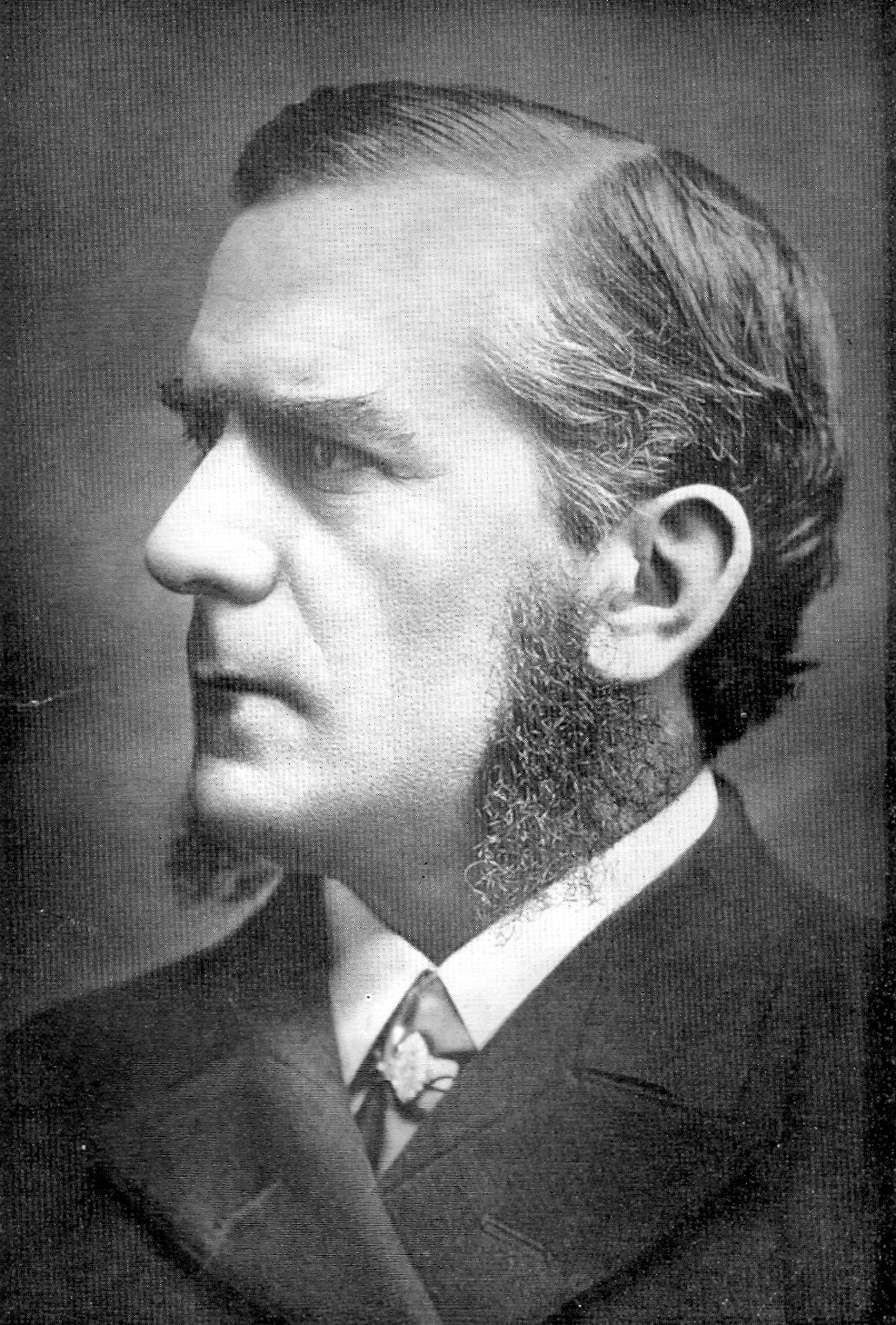
Clarke

Schuster

Ridgeway

General election 1906: City of London (2 seats)
Party	Candidate	Votes	%	±%
Conservative	Edward Clarke	16,019	38.0	N/A
Conservative	Alban Gibbs	15,619	37.2	N/A
Liberal	Felix Schuster	5,313	12.7	New
Liberal	Joseph West Ridgeway	5,064	12.1	New
Majority		10,306	24.5	N/A
Turnout		42,015	68.7	N/A
Registered electors		31,030		
Conservative hold		Swing	N/A	
Conservative hold		Swing	N/A	

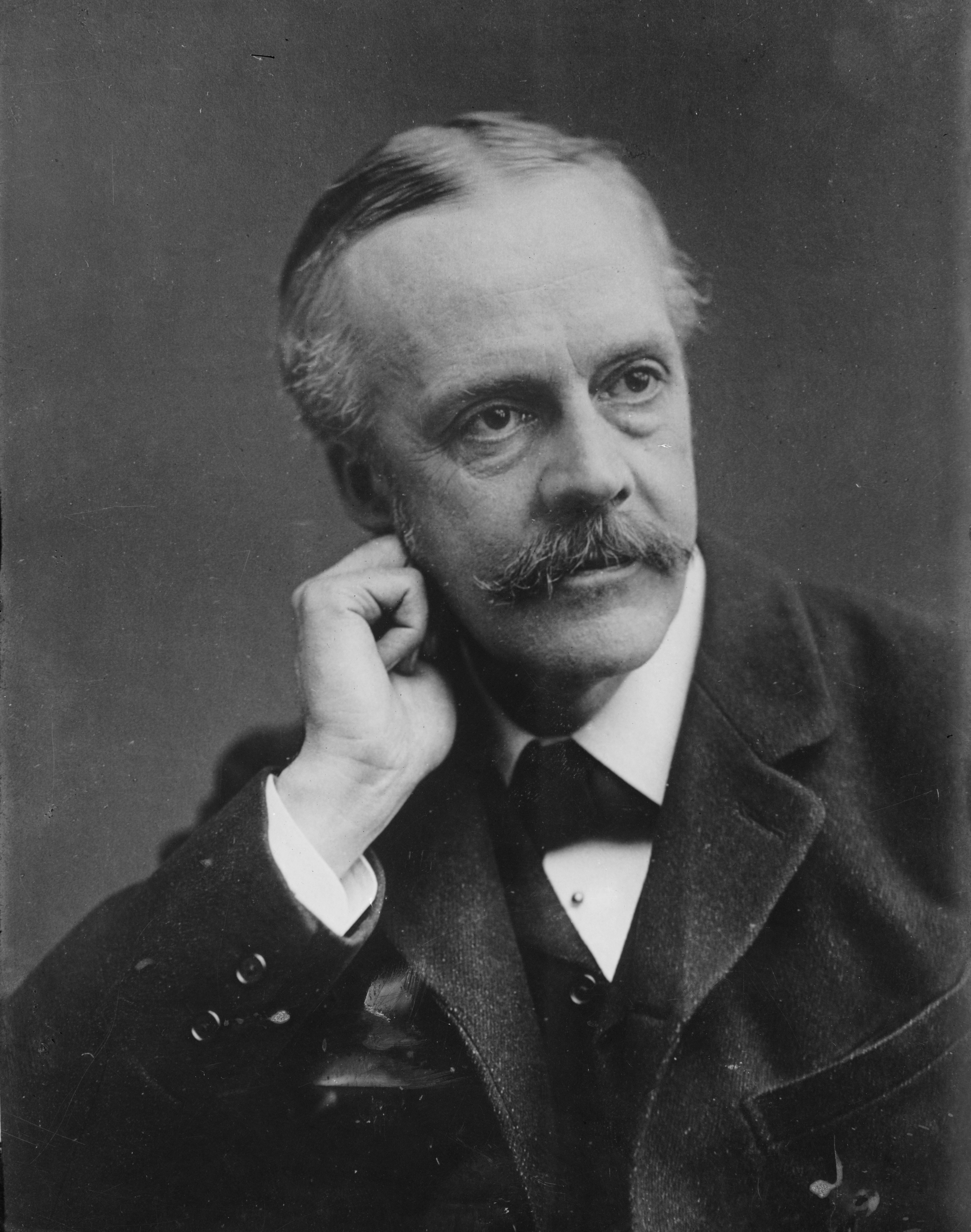
Balfour

February 1906 City of London by-election
Party	Candidate	Votes	%	±%
Conservative	Arthur Balfour	15,474	78.9	+3.7
Free Trader	Thomas Gibson Bowles	4,134	21.1	New
Majority		11,340	57.8	+33.3
Turnout		19,608	63.2	−5.5
Registered electors		31,030		
Conservative hold		Swing		

Banbury

June 1906 City of London by-election
Party	Candidate	Votes	%	±%
Conservative	Frederick Banbury	Unopposed		
Conservative hold				

=== Elections in the 1910s ===
General election January 1910: City of London (2 seats)
Party	Candidate	Votes	%	±%
Conservative	Arthur Balfour	17,907	45.0	+7.0
Conservative	Frederick Banbury	17,302	43.4	+6.2
Liberal	Hugh Bell	4,623	11.6	−13.2
Turnout		39,832	74.7	+6.0
Registered electors		30,010		
Majority		12,679	31.8	+7.3
Conservative hold				
Conservative hold				

General election December 1910: City of London (2 seats)
Party	Candidate	Votes	%	±%
Conservative	Arthur Balfour	Unopposed		
Conservative	Frederick Banbury	Unopposed		
Conservative hold				
Conservative hold				

General election 1918: City of London (2 seats)
Party		Candidate	Votes	%	±%
C	Unionist	Arthur Balfour	Unopposed		
C	Unionist	Frederick Banbury	Unopposed		
	Unionist hold				
	Unionist hold				
C indicates candidate endorsed by the coalition government.

=== Elections in the 1920s ===
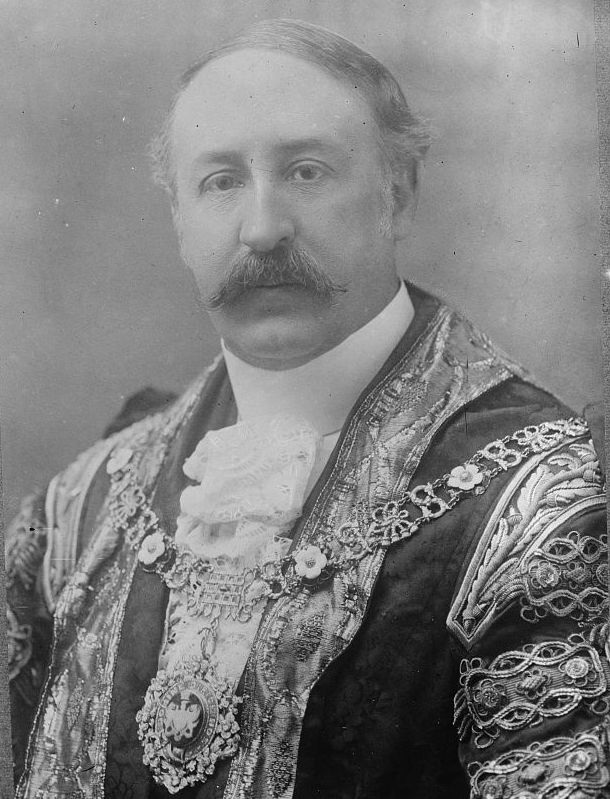
Bowater

1922 City of London by-election
Party	Candidate	Votes	%	±%
Unionist	Edward Grenfell	10,114	62.08	N/A
Ind. Unionist	Vansittart Bowater	6,178	37.92	New
Majority		3,936	24.16	N/A
Turnout		16,292	36.96	N/A
Unionist hold		Swing	N/A	

General election 1922: City of London (2 seats)
Party	Candidate	Votes	%	±%
Unionist	Frederick Banbury	Unopposed	N/A	N/A
Unionist	Edward Grenfell	Unopposed	N/A	N/A
Unionist hold				

General election 1923: City of London (2 seats)
Party	Candidate	Votes	%	±%
Unionist	Frederick Banbury	Unopposed	N/A	N/A
Unionist	Edward Grenfell	Unopposed	N/A	N/A
Unionist hold				

1924 City of London by-election
Party	Candidate	Votes	%	±%
Unionist	Vansittart Bowater	12,962	70.11	N/A
Liberal	Henry Bell	5,525	29.89	New
Majority		7,437	40.22	N/A
Turnout		18,487	41.89	N/A
Unionist hold		Swing	N/A	

General election 1924: City of London (2 seats)
Party	Candidate	Votes	%	±%
Unionist	Vansittart Bowater	Unopposed	N/A	N/A
Unionist	Edward Grenfell	Unopposed	N/A	N/A
Unionist hold				

Jacobsen

General election 1929: City of London (2 seats)
Party	Candidate	Votes	%	±%
Unionist	Vansittart Bowater	16,149	43.9	N/A
Unionist	Edward Grenfell	16,092	43.7	N/A
Liberal	Thomas Owen Jacobsen	4,579	12.4	New
Majority		11,513	31.3	N/A
Turnout		36,820	45.2	N/A
Unionist hold		Swing	N/A	

=== Elections in the 1930s ===
General election 1931: City of London (2 seats)
Party	Candidate	Votes	%	±%
Conservative	Vansittart Bowater	Unopposed	N/A	N/A
Conservative	Edward Grenfell	Unopposed	N/A	N/A
Conservative hold				

1935 City of London by-election
Party	Candidate	Votes	%	±%
Conservative	Alan Anderson	Unopposed	N/A	N/A
Conservative hold				

General election 1935: City of London (2 seats)
Party	Candidate	Votes	%	±%
Conservative	Alan Anderson	Unopposed	N/A	N/A
Conservative	Vansittart Bowater	Unopposed	N/A	N/A
Conservative hold				

1938 City of London by-election
Party	Candidate	Votes	%	±%
Conservative	George Broadbridge	Unopposed	N/A	N/A
Conservative hold				

=== Elections in the 1940s ===
1940 City of London by-election
Party	Candidate	Votes	%	±%
National	Andrew Duncan	Unopposed	N/A	N/A
National gain from Conservative				

General election 1945: City of London (2 seats)
Party	Candidate	Votes	%	±%
National	Andrew Duncan	5,332	39.48	N/A
Conservative	George Broadbridge	5,309	39.31	N/A
Liberal	Andrew McFadyean	1,487	11.01	New
Independent	S. W. Alexander	1,379	10.21	New
Majority		3,822	28.30	N/A
Turnout		13,507	63.9	N/A
Conservative hold		Swing		

1945 City of London by-election
Party	Candidate	Votes	%	±%
Conservative	Ralph Assheton	4,506	74.99	+35.68
Liberal	Arthur Comyns Carr	1,503	25.01	+14.00
Majority		3,003	49.98	N/A
Turnout		6,009	51.58	−12.3
Conservative hold		Swing		

== See also ==
- Duration of English, British and United Kingdom parliaments from 1660
- List of parliamentary constituencies in London
- Cities of London and Westminster (UK Parliament constituency)

== Bibliography ==
- Boundaries of Parliamentary Constituencies 1885-1972, compiled and edited by F.W.S. Craig (Political Reference Publications 1972)
- British Parliamentary Election Results 1832-1885, compiled and edited by F.W.S. Craig (The Macmillan Press 1977)
- British Parliamentary Election Results 1885-1918, compiled and edited by F.W.S. Craig (The Macmillan Press 1974)
- British Parliamentary Election Results 1918-1949, compiled and edited by F.W.S. Craig (The Macmillan Press 1977)
- The House of Commons 1715-1754, by Romney Sedgwick (HMSO 1970)
- The House of Commons 1754-1790, by Sir Lewis Namier and John Brooke (HMSO 1964)
- The Parliaments of England by Henry Stooks Smith (1st edition published in three volumes 1844–50), second edition edited (in one volume) by F.W.S. Craig (Political Reference Publications 1973)
- Who's Who of British Members of Parliament: Volume I 1832-1885, edited by M. Stenton (The Harvester Press 1976)
- The Times, various editions, was used to obtain dates of elections or unopposed returns and first names of candidates not available in the above books (from 1885 to 1910). The dates of declarations are used before 1885 and the dates of the General Election polling day from 1918.
- Leigh Rayment's Historical List of MPs – Constituencies beginning with "L" (part 3)

Parliament of the United Kingdom
Preceded by Tamworth	Constituency represented by the prime minister 1846–1852	Vacant until 1855 Title next held by Tiverton
