= Edward Lombe (MP) =

English politician

Edward Lombe (born about 1799/1800 – died 1 March 1852) was a landowner and a Member of Parliament for Arundel from 1826 to 1830.

Lombe (formerly surnamed Beevor) was born about 1799/1800, oldest son of Edward Beevor (who took name of Lombe for himself and issue by Act of Parliament 7 July 1817), attorney, of Norwich (d. February 1847) and his wife Sylvia.

The 1826 election was contentious. Arundel borough constituency was effectively a rotten borough (also known as a pocket or nomination borough) in the Parliament of 1826 because its electorate was small enough that its representation in Parliament was effectively controlled by a single wealthy patron, Bernard Howard, 12th Duke of Norfolk. Norfolk was an advocate for some of 'The Green' reforms, including Catholic emancipation. In other instances he was aligned with 'The Castle' faction who were associated with powerful landholders.

The parliamentary borough was coextensive with the parish of Arundel, which at the time was a small prosperous market town surrounded by agricultural land. Local power in Arundel was exercised by the corporation, which consisted of a mayor, the returning officer for parliamentary elections, and 12 other capital burgesses (vacancies were often left unfilled), who held their offices for life. Norfolk did not interfere in the corporation’s affairs, and the corporation took no ‘active part as a body’ in parliamentary elections, although some of its members were hostile to the 'Castle' or 'Green' interests.

In his final year as an MP, 1830, Lombe resided at 22 Fludyer Street, Blackheath, London, a historic location near Parliament, known for its association with the Foreign Office. Lombe may have been too independent from Norfolk, especially during an unstable parliament, with both principal parties fractured, and four consecutive prime ministers. He served in just one parliament and his successor in the seat, Lord Dudley Coutts Stuart, became a two-term holder. It is also possible that Lombe had some sort of legal difficulties that required his departure from England, as alluded to in his obituary in the Norfolk News of 13 March 1852.

He lived abroad from 1830 and travelled frequently in Italy. Lombe married on 21 November 1831 in Berne, Switzerland, to Marie Rozer de St. Julien, of St. Julien, Meuse, France.

Edward Lombe underwrote Harriet Martineau's translation of Comte, providing her 500 British pounds (equivalent to £69,000 in 2023) and in further correspondence entreated her to request additional funds from him. The Webbs claim that Matineau tells us that her father had amputated Lombe's diseased leg when he was a young man, but this is unlikely since her uncle Philip Meadows Martineau (1752–1829) was known as a surgeon whereas Martineau's father was known as a businessman; Lombe appears to have first been motivated by correspondence with the publisher John Chapman. But Lombe died on 1 March 1852 in Florence, before the first edition of Martineau's book, "The Positive Philosophy of Auguste Comte, Freely Translated and Condensed, 2 Volumes", was first published by John Chapman in 1853.

Since Lombe had no offspring, his Great Melton Hall and Bylaugh Hall estates devolved to his father's younger brother Charles Lombe (formerly Beevor).

== See also ==
- 1826 United Kingdom general election
- List of acts of the Parliament of the United Kingdom from 1826

Parliament of the United Kingdom
Preceded by Viscount Bury; Thomas Read Kemp	Member of Parliament for Arundel; 1826–1830; With: John Atkins	Succeeded by John Atkins; Lord Dudley Stuart
