= Daniel Lambert (MP) =

British politician

Sir Daniel Lambert (7 September 1685 – 13 May 1750) was a British politician. He sat as MP for London from 1741 till 1747 and as Lord Mayor of London from March till October 1741.

He also served as common councillor of London from 1732 till 1737, vintner from 1737 till 1750, master of the Vintners' Co. in 1741, sheriff of London from 1733 till 1734, alderman of London from 1737 till 1750, auditor of Irish Society from 1735 till 1737 and governor of Irish Society from 1741 till 1744.

He was the third son of Daniel Lambert and Elizabeth, the daughter of Reverend Thomas Emmes, rector of East Tisted, Hertfordshire. His marriage to Mary, the daughter and coheiress of John Wilmot, a London merchant was licensed on 9 May 1709. They had no children.

He was knighted on 18 February 1744.
