= Halstead Place =

Historic house in Mississippi, United States

Halstead Place was a historic residence located at East Brach Drive in Ocean Springs, Mississippi, constructed in 1910. It was on the National Register of Historic Places until 2008, and was destroyed by Hurricane Katrina in 2005.
