= Robert Godschall =

English politician

Sir Robert Godschall (c. 1692 – 26 June 1742) was an English politician and ironmonger. He sat as MP for London from 1741 till his death on 26 June 1742 and served as Lord Mayor of London from 1741 till his death. He was noted to be a "subscriber" to Swedish king Gustavus Vasa.

He also served as Director of the R. Exchange Assurance from 1729 till his death, Sheriff from 1735 till 1736 and president of St. Bartholomew's Hospital from 1741 till his death. He was appointed master in the Ironmongers' Co. in 1733 and alderman of London in 1732. In 1729, Godschall purchased Weston Manor in Surrey.

He was the son of John Godschall, a merchant and his wife, Bathia Charleton. He married Catherine, the daughter of William Tryon and had no children. He was knighted on 31 October 1735.
