= Robert Ladbroke =

English politician (1713–1773)

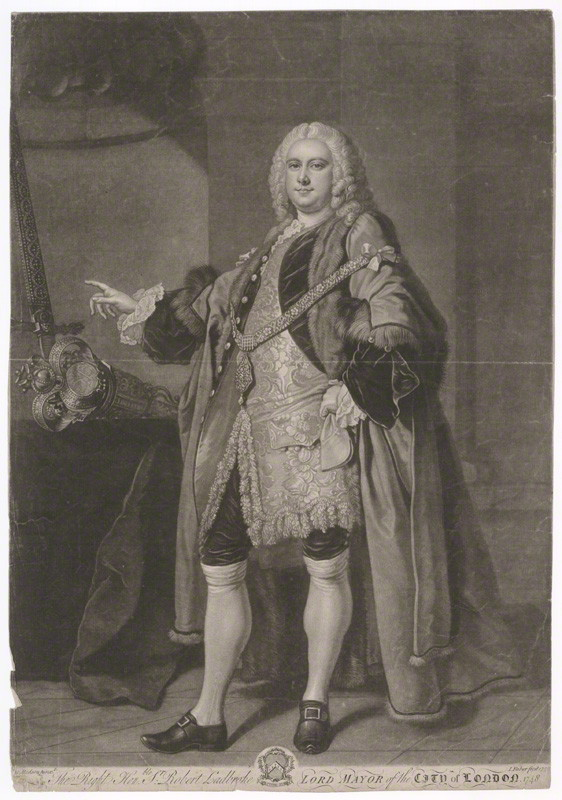
1750 portrait of Ladbroke by John Faber the Younger after Thomas Hudson

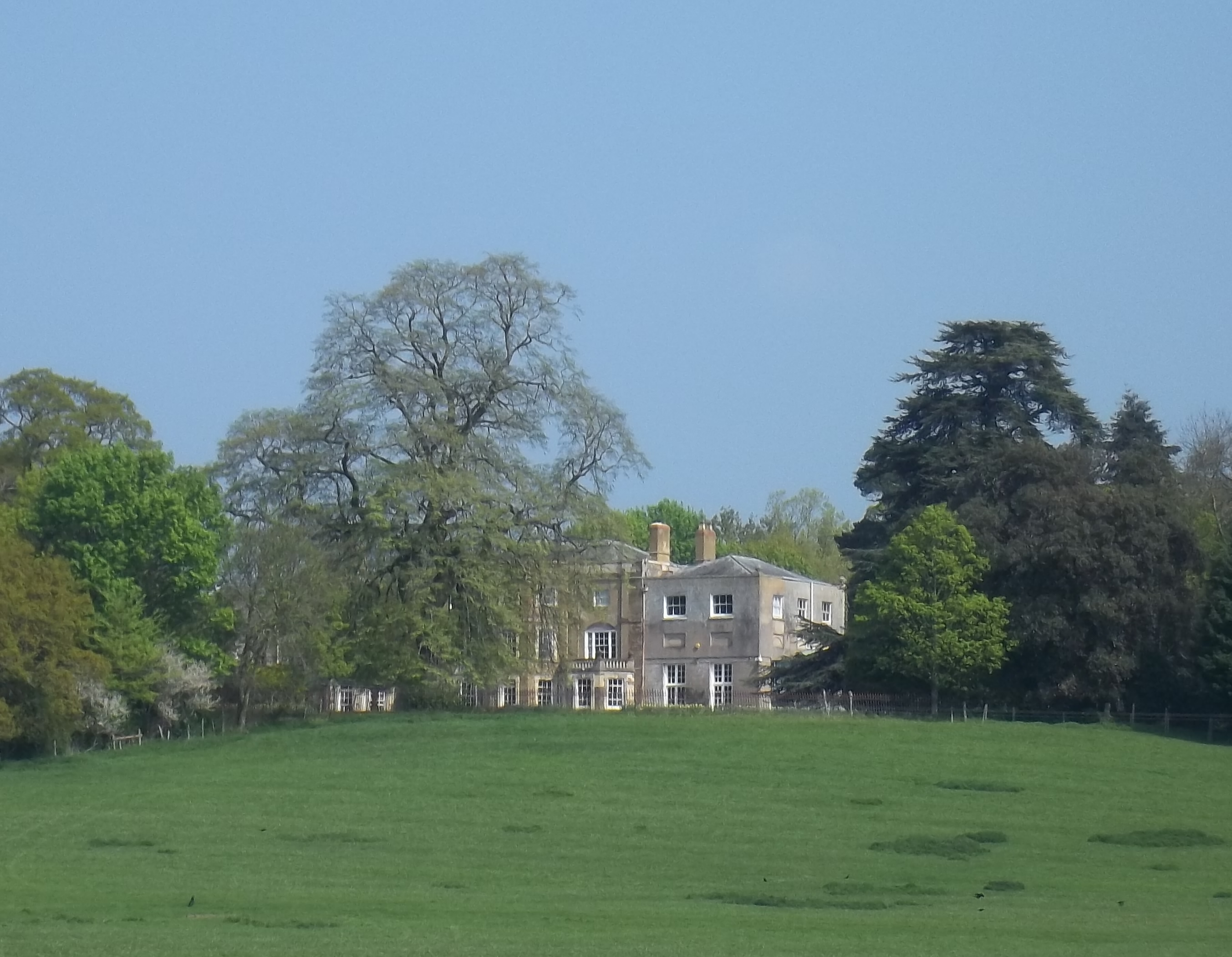
Idlicote House

Sir Robert Ladbroke (1713 – 31 October 1773) was an English merchant and politician who sat in the British House of Commons from 1754 to 1770. He also served as Lord Mayor of London in 1747.

Ladbroke was a member of a Warwickshire family who set up in business in London, becoming an Alderman of London in 1741 and Sheriff of London in 1743. He was knighted in 1744. He was elected Lord Mayor of London in 1747 and a Member of Parliament for London from 1754 to 1770. In 1771 he became partner, with his son and son-in-law Walter Rawlinson, in the London bank of Ladbroke, Rawlinson and Porker.

He purchased Idlicote House in Idlicote, Warwickshire in 1759. He married Elizabeth, the daughter of John Brown of St. Botolph, Bishopsgate. Their only son Robert, also both banker and politician, would later sell Idlicote and move to Surrey. Robert junior married Elizabeth Hannah Kingscote (b. 22 Mar 1751) on 19 September 1769 in the Municipal Borough of Walthamstow, Essex. Their son was banker and cricketer Felix Ladbroke.

His grave in Christ Church in Spitalfields has a monument designed by John Flaxman RA.

== See also ==
- List of Lord Mayors of London
- List of Sheriffs of London

Civic offices
Preceded by William Benn	Lord Mayor of London; 1747-1748	Succeeded by Sir William Calvert
