= Thomas Wilson (c.1767–1852) =

Thomas Wilson (c.1767–1852) was an English West India merchant and politician.

== Life ==
He was the son of Robert Wilson of Wood House, East Ham, in Essex. By 1794 he was in partnership with the Agassiz family of Fenchurch Street, London. With a background in commerce on Grenada, he stood successfully for parliament for the City of London in 1818. He was re-elected in the 1820 general election, a consistent advocate of mercantile interests.

In 1824 Wilson's firm became Wilson and Blanshard, a company that endured through most of the 19th century in various locations. He did not stand for re-election in 1826.

Thomas was the first chairman of the National Institution for the Preservation of Life from Shipwreck (now known as the Royal National Lifeboat Institution, RNLI), from 1824 to 1849. He supported Sir William Hillary's appeal for a national institution and lobbied his political friends for further support. Thomas Wilson was elected chairman at the first meeting, held in the London Tavern in Bishopsgate.
