= Slingsby Bethell =

English Member of Parliament and Lord Mayor of London

Slingsby Bethell (1695–1758) of Tower Hill, London was an English Member of Parliament and Lord Mayor of London.

He was the third son of William Bethell of Swinden, Yorkshire and the younger brother of Hugh Bethell. In his early life he bought a plantation in Antigua and returned to work in London as a well-to-do merchant involved in the Africa trade.

He was a member of the Fishmongers’ Company from 1749 to his death, an alderman of London in 1749, Sheriff of the City of London for 1751–52, and Lord Mayor of London for 1755–56. He was Member of Parliament for the City of London from 1747 to November 1758.

He died unmarried in 1758.

Civic offices
Preceded by Sir Stephen Janssen, Bt	Lord Mayor of London; 1755–1756	Succeeded by Marshe Dickinson
