= Shaw baronets =

Set index for Shaw baronets

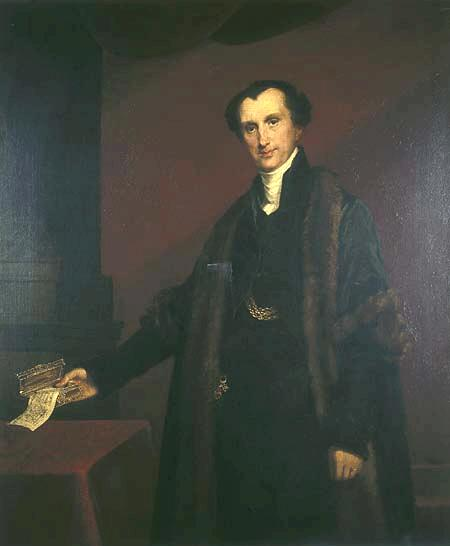
Sir James Shaw, 1st Baronet

There have been six baronetcies created for persons with the surname Shaw, one in the Baronetage of England, one in the Baronetage of Nova Scotia and four in the Baronetage of the United Kingdom. Two of the creations are extant as of 2026.

- Shaw baronets of Eltham (1665): see Best-Shaw baronets
- Shaw baronets of Greenock (1687)
- Shaw baronets of Kilmarnock (first creation, 1809): see Sir James Shaw, 1st Baronet (1764–1843)
- Shaw baronets of Kilmarnock (second creation, 1813)
- Shaw baronets of Bushy Park (1821)
- Shaw baronets of Wolverhampton (1908): see Sir Charles Shaw, 1st Baronet (1859–1942)

== See also ==
- Shaw-Stewart baronets
