= Sir John Anderson, 1st Baronet, of Mill Hill =

British politician

Anderson baronets
- Escutcheon of the Anderson baronets of Mill Hill
- Creation date: 1798
- Status: extinct
- Extinction date: 1813

Sir John William Anderson, 1st Baronet (ca. 1736 – 21 May 1813) was a British politician.

Born in Danzig, he was the son of William Anderson and Lucy Sheldon who had settled in that town. Anderson was an alderman of Aldersgate between 1789 and 1813 and Sheriff of London between 1791 and 1792. He was Master of the Worshipful Company of Glovers in 1794. He was a Member of Parliament (MP) for London from 1793 to 1806. Between 1797 and 1798, Anderson was Lord Mayor of London. On 14 May 1798, he was made a baronet, of Mill Hill, Hendon, in the County of Middlesex.

In 1762, he married Dorothy Simkins, daughter of Charles Simkins. Their marriage was childless. Anderson died in May 1813 and the baronetcy became extinct.

== Involvement in slave trade ==
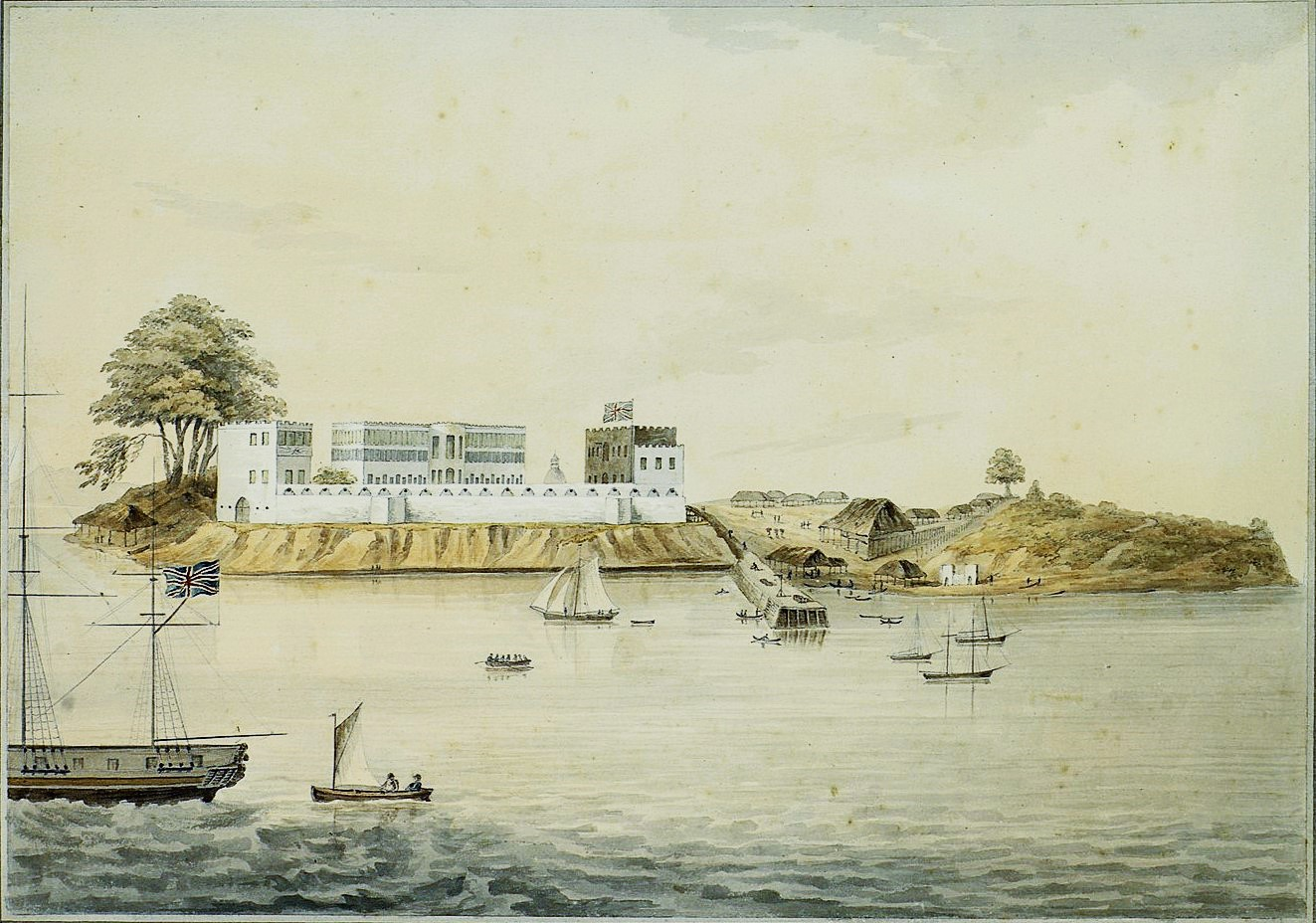
Bunce Island, 1805, during the period the slave factory was run by John & Alexander Anderson

John, with his brother Alexander, owned a slave factory on Bance Island. Their business was based in Philpot Lane, Eastcheap. John was active politically to prevent any restrictions in the running of the slave trade, for example working with his brother to organise a petition to the House of Lords in 1799. John was also an investor in the West India Dock Company. He was a director of the company from 1803 until his death.

Parliament of Great Britain
Preceded by Brook Watson; Sir Watkin Lewes; John Sawbridge; Sir William Curtis	Member of Parliament for London; 1793–1800; With: John Sawbridge 1793–1795; Sir Watkin Lewes 1793–1796; Sir William Curtis from 1793; William Lushington from 1795; Harvey Christian Combe from 1796	Succeeded by Parliament of the United Kingdom
Parliament of the United Kingdom
Preceded by Parliament of Great Britain	Member of Parliament for London; 1801–1806; With: Sir William Curtis to 1806; William Lushington to 1802; Harvey Christian Combe to 1806; Sir Charles Price 1802–1806	Succeeded by Sir Charles Price; Harvey Christian Combe; Sir James Shaw; Sir William Curtis
Civic offices
Preceded by Brook Watson	Lord Mayor of London; 1797–1798	Succeeded by Sir Richard Glyn
Baronetage of Great Britain
New creation	Baronet (); 1798–1813	Extinct
Preceded by Hay baronets	Anderson baronets of Mill Hill; 14 May 1798	Succeeded by Anstruther baronets
