= 2025 Kilmarnock fire =

Fire in Kilmarnock, East Ayrshire, Scotland

2025 King Street fire
- Victoria Buildings from the Sandbed Lane side on fire on the evening of 14 July
- Date: July 14–16, 2025
- Time: Between 21:00PM and 21:30PM (GMT)
- Duration: Burned for over 40 hours between 14–16 July 2025
- Location: Victoria Buildings, King Street, Kilmarnock, East Ayrshire, Scotland; 55.60871°N 4.49721°W
- Type: Deliberate fire; arson attack
- Outcome: Investigation by Police Scotland; CID investigation; Demolition of Victoria Buildings
- Property damage: Partial collapse of a Category C listed building (Victoria Buildings)
- Inquiries: Police Scotland inquiry
- Arrests: 2; both 12 year old boys
- Suspects: 2; both 11 year old boys

Between 9:00pm and 9:30pm on Monday 14 July 2025, the Scottish Fire and Rescue Service was alerted to a fire on King Street, the main shopping street in the town of Kilmarnock, East Ayrshire which was initially started on the adjacent Sandbed Street. By the time the Scottish Fire and Rescue service arrived at the scene of the fire, it was already well established and had begun spreading to adjacent buildings. Fire crews remained on the scene until 16 July 2025, two days following the outbreak of the fire, confirming that they were confident the fire was fully extinguished by 16 July but crews would continue to monitor the site to eliminate any potential for fire to reignite.

Victoria Buildings, a Category C listed building located at 61-63 King Street, suffered serious damage as a result of the fire, and collapsed both internally and at the front facade of the building which faced onto King Street. Despite the severity of the fire and subsequent collapse of Victoria Buildings, there were no reported injuries. A subsequent criminal investigation was launched by the Criminal Investigation Department (CID) of Police Scotland.

Two 12-year-old boys were arrested and charged on the 17 and 18 July and will appear at Kilmarnock Sheriff Court later in the month. Two 11-year-old boys were spoken to by Police Scotland in connection to the fire, and a report will be submitted to relevant authorities.

== The building ==
The building in which the fire originally originated was Victoria Buildings, located between 61 and 63 King Street. A Category C listed building, it was built for Robert Rogerson for his grocery business, and was considered by the contemporary press as an example "of a 'self-possessed restful facade". Designed by Thomas Smellie, it was influenced by the architecture of Glasgow, particularly the Athenaeum Theatre situated on Buchanan Street. The buildings were noted for its "distinctive corner tower and ogee–hatted lead roof".

A 3–storey building, it was designated by Historic Environment Scotland as a "5-bay Flemish Renaissance residential and commercial property" consisting of a "near-symmetrical upper section, corbelled polygonal tower, moulded string course" which was constructed in a "Red Ballochmyle stone to main elevation and red brick to side elevation". Victoria Buildings were designated a Category C listed building by Historic Environment Scotland on 1 August 2002.

== Events ==
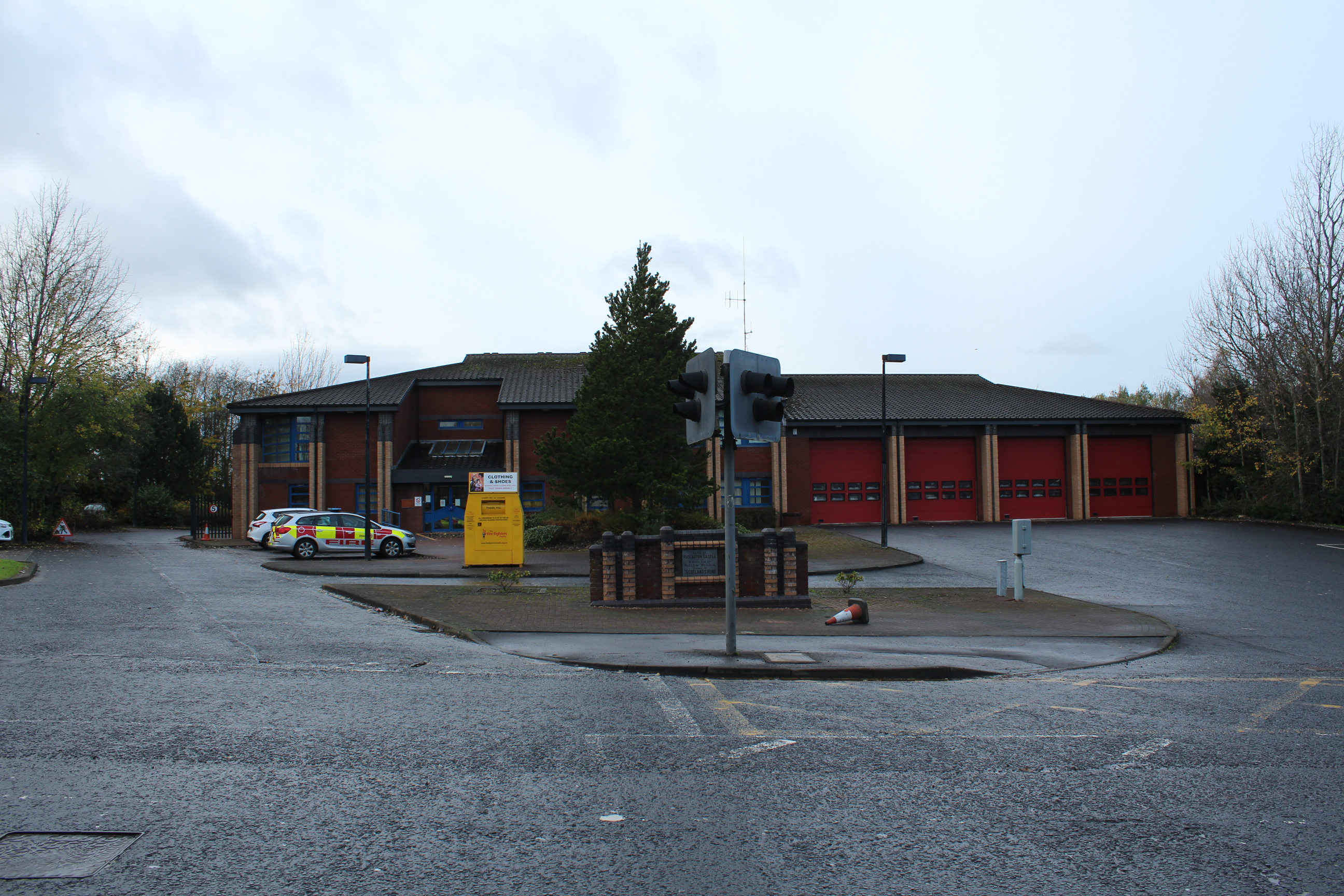
Appliances and firefighters from the Kilmarnock Scottish Fire and Rescue Service station were first to respond

Between the hours of 21:00PM and 21:30PM GMT on Monday 14 July 2025, the Scottish Fire and Rescue Service were alerted to a fire which began in the King Street area of Kilmarnock. Only a matter of weeks prior to the fire, the Scottish Fire and Rescue Service across the Ayrshire region had expressed concerns over the number of fires they were dealing with which were being set deliberately primarily at derelict buildings. Upon arriving at the scene, the fire was described by firefighters as already being well developed and spreading to nearby buildings. Initially, the Scottish Fire and Rescue Service deployed two fire engines and a height vehicle to the fire, however, the fire soon became uncountable and began spreading to nearby buildings. At the peak of the fire, the Scottish Fire and Rescue Service said that a total of 45 firefighters and six appliances were in attendance to attempt to tackle the fire. Shortly after the outbreak of the fire, Victoria Buildings collapsed both internally along with the front facing facade which faced King Street. Scottish Water issued a statement to highlight potential impacts on water supply in the area as a result of the efforts to extinguish the fire, whilst Scottish Gas had cut off supply to King Street in order to minimise any risk and impact to emergency services. Nearby residents to the area were advised to keep windows and doors closed due to associated risks of breathing in smoke being produced by the fire.

Drone footage showing the extent of the damage at Victoria Buildings and its collapse

On 15 July 2025, a statement from the leader of East Ayrshire Council, Councillor Douglas Reid, confirmed that the damage to the building was "worse than we had first imagined" and "our teams are working under the direction of Police Scotland and Scottish Fire and Rescue Service". East Ayrshire Council had deployed Building Standards officers to the site to assess the structural damage to Victoria Buildings as a result of its collapse, and was later confirmed that the building required to be demolished in the interest of public safety having previously been deemed unsafe by Building Standards. The majority of businesses which trade in King Street, the main shopping street in the town of Kilmarnock, were unable to open as a result of a police cordon spanning the majority of King Street. Reid said that East Ayrshire Council were not in a position to "know the full extent of the damage until business owners can regain access to their properties" and recognised that "this could result in a critical loss of income and jeopardise their ability to continue to trade". In response, a Kilmarnock Town Centre Recovery Fund was established by East Ayrshire Council in order to support local small businesses with direct financial assistance. A separate support scheme was established in order to focus on strategic engagement with Bonmarche, a female clothing retailer which traded within Victoria Buildings which was completely destroyed by the fire.

King Street from the St Marnock Street and Sanbed Lane junctions remained closed on 15 July 2025, with retailers including JD Sports unable to trade. Police Scotland advised members of the public to avoid the area entirely. Roads which lead to King Street and Sandbed Lane which were initially closed were reopened on the morning of 15 July 2025.

== Aftermath and consequences ==
=== Affected businesses ===
In his statement issued on 15 July 2025, the leader of East Ayrshire Council expressed his concern at the loss of a national retailer, Bonmarche, as a result of the fire, saying "the loss of a national retailer Bonmarche in the town centre also raises concerns about job losses, reduced footfall and the longer-term impact of town centre recovery". Other affected businesses include a tattoo shop, SixtyOne Cafe, and Pop Up Scotland. Niky Brown, the owner of Hard Luck Tatoo which traded within the building, established a Go Fund page which quickly reached over £13,000 in donations.

East Ayrshire Council established a £10,000 grant assistance package for the three businesses which were located within Victoria Buildings at the time of the fire. Other affected businesses on King Street which were not permitted to open in the days following the fire are eligible to apply for a £3,000 support package.

=== King Street closure ===
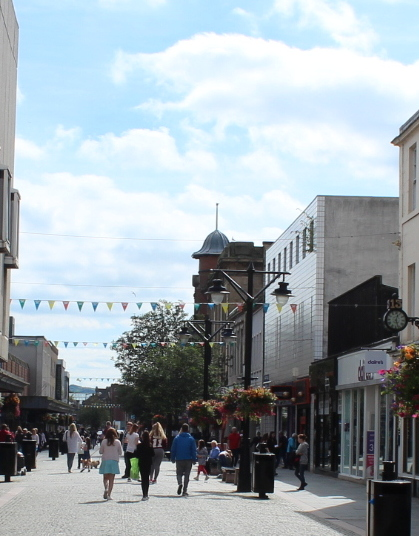
King Street remained closed in the days following the fire. The dome tower of Victoria Buildings is visible in the centre

The exclusion zone which had been erected since the outbreak of the fie on 14 July is expected to be reduced following the conclusion of phase one of the demolition works. Owners of nearby businesses will be permitted to gain access to their properties once demolition work has been successfully completed. The restoration of power and water supplies is expected to "take some time". Before any public access can be permitted to King Street, Ayrshire Roads Alliance, the department of East Ayrshire Council responsible for roads and public pathways, will be required to conduct a "thorough street safety check" which will involve the repair of street lamps and road surfaces which were damaged as a result of both the fire and the subsequent collapse of Victoria Buildings.

On 18 July, Ayrshire Roads Alliance conducted an assessment of King Street and found no obvious signs of damage to the road or public footpaths around the scene of the collapse. As a result, businesses at the top of King Street closest to the Kilmarnock Cross were permitted to resume trading from 19 July, including JD Sports, CeX, Three mobile, New Look and Stewart Travel. Further businesses were permitted to open by 22 July, including Marks & Spencer. Other businesses which were still within the active exclusion zone remained closed. The Bank of Scotland, whilst laying outside the exclusion zone, were not ready to open on 22 July as a result of debris from the fire, but opened to the public on 23 July.

East Ayrshire Council confirmed that following demolition, a "complete a further assessment will be made to work out how much further demolition is needed". King Street fully re–opened to the public on 4 August following demolition of Victoria Buildings. Scottish Gas were required to install new gas mains on King Street which were damaged as a result of the fire, however, this had no affect on the re–opening of the street.

=== Demolition of Victoria Buildings ===
By 16 July 2025, East Ayrshire Council had appointed both a Structural Engineer a demolition contractor to begin the demolition process of Victoria Buildings. Demotion of the building began on Thursday 17 July 2025, three days following the fire. Demolition work is expected to be conducted in two phases, phase one will demolish the facade of Victoria Buildings which faces King Street, and was completed by the evening of 18 July. Demolition work at the front facade on King Street poised no issues, however, the eastern side elevation required more "intricate handling" as a result of its close proximity to other buildings.

Phase two of the demolition of Victoria Buildings began on 21 July under police escort.

=== Investigation and arrests ===
Police Scotland confirmed that they were treating the fire as being started deliberately and as a "wilful act", and were working on an active line of enquiry. They quickly issued a statement of caution to the public in regards to "speculating or using unsuitable language on social media while these enquiries are ongoing". Chief Inspector from Police Scotland, Scott McCurdy, issued a statement in which he was "appealing to anyone who was in the area around the time of the fire and who saw anything suspicious to contact Police Scotland", and issued a plea for "anyone who was in the area and who may have dashcam or private CCTV which could assist us to get in touch".

It was confirmed by Police Scotland on 17 July 2025 that they had arrested and charged a 12-year-old boy in connection with the fire. The boy was subsequently released by Police Scotland on an undertaking that he appears at Kilmarnock Sheriff Court later in July 2025 in connection with the charges. Despite an arrest being made, Police Scotland confirmed that enquiries and the investigation was "ongoing", but that the scene of the fire was no longer being treated as an "active crime scene". On 18 July, another 12-year-old boy was arrested and charged in connection with the fire, bringing the total of arrests to two, whilst two 11-year-old boys were questioned and spoken to by officers from Police Scotland, with a report being published for the relevant authorities.

== Reactions ==
Lillian Jones, the Member of Parliament (MP) for the Kilmarnock and Loudoun constituency said that her "thoughts are with everyone affected by the serious fire on King Street in Kilmarnock", adding that she was "incredibly grateful to the Scottish Fire and Rescue Service and Police Scotland for their swift response and dedication throughout the night". Councillor Douglas Reid, the leader of East Ayrshire Council, praised the community response following the fire.

== See also ==
- List of listed buildings in Kilmarnock, East Ayrshire
- 2025 in Scotland
