= Alexander Anderson (slave trader) =

British slave trader

Alexander Anderson was a British slave trader who was in business with his brother Sir John Anderson, together forming John and Alexander Anderson & Co.

They owned a slave factory on Bance Island, Sierra Leone Their business was based in Philpot Lane, Eastcheap. Alexander was active politically to prevent any attempt to abolish or limit the slave trade, for example working with his brother to organise a petition to the House of Lords in 1799.
