= Sir John Shaw, 1st Baronet =

English merchant and politician

Sir John Shaw, 1st Baronet (c. 1615 – 1680) of Eltham Lodge, Kent was an English merchant and politician who sat in the House of Commons from 1661 to 1679.

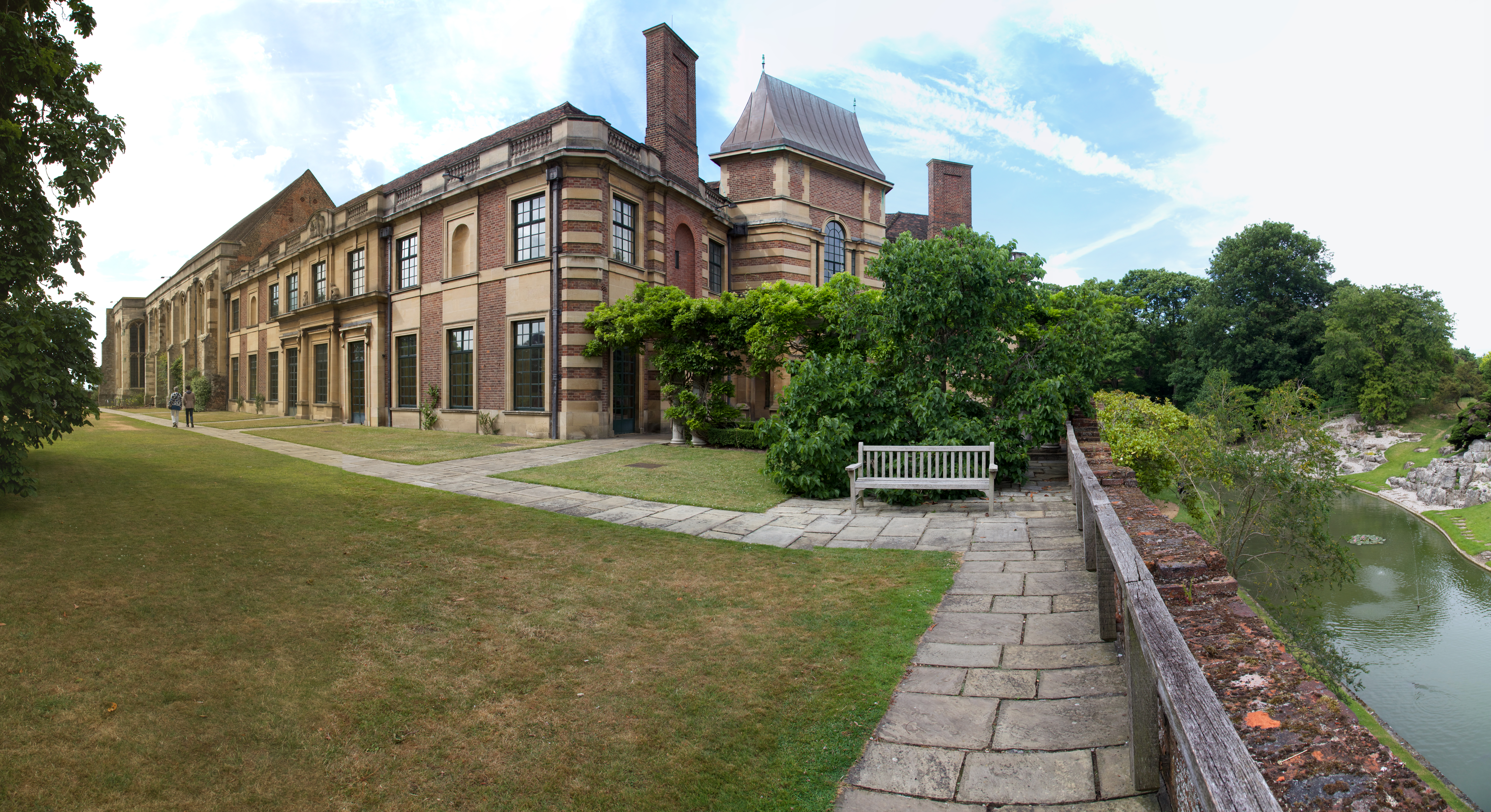
the rebuilt Eltham Palace

Shaw was the second son of London vintner Robert Shaw (d. 1678) and his wife Elizabeth Domilowe, daughter of John Domilowe of London. He made a considerable fortune in business and provided Charles II during exile with considerable sums of money. After the Restoration, he was made one of the Farmers of the Customs of London.

He was knighted on 28 July 1660. In 1661, he was elected Member of Parliament for Lyme Regis in the Cavalier Parliament. From 1663 he leased, from the Crown, the Manor of Eltham which included the then derelict "Kings House" or Eltham Palace and built a new manor house, Eltham Lodge, on the estate. He was created baronet of Eltham on 15 April 1665. In 1667, he rebuilt the north aisle of Eltham Church.

He was appointed a Gentleman of the privy chamber from June 1660 until his death. He was a commissioner of customs from September 1660 to 1662, customs farmer from 1662 to 1671 and a commissioner of trade from November 1660 to 1668. He was also joint paymaster of the Dunkirk garrison from December 1660 to 1662, surveyor of shipping from 1661 to his death, assistant Royal Adventurers into Africa by 1664 to 1671 and surveyor of woods and forests c.1667.

He was made Lieutenant-colonel of the White Regiment of foot militia of London from 1660 to c.1665 and a commissioner for assessment for London (1661–63), for Kent (1663–64) and (1667 to his death), and for London and Surrey (1664–69). He was appointed commissioner for loyal and indigent officers for London and Westminster (1662), collector of customs for London from 1669 to his death and commissioner for recusants for Kent in 1675.

He married twice. He had married on 28 October 1649, Sarah Ashe, daughter of Joseph Ashe, of Freshford, Somerset. She died in December 1662, and was buried at St Mildred's, Bread Street. They had a son John, who was to succeed his father as 2nd Baronet.

He married secondly at Eltham on 24 June 1663, Bridget, Dowager Viscountess Kilmorey, daughter of Sir William Drury, of Besthorpe, Norfolk, and his wife Mary Cokayne, daughter of William Cockayne, merchant, of London. They had two children, Charles and Elizabeth.

Shaw died at the age of 64 in Great Southampton (or Bloomsbury) Square, St Giles in the Fields, London and was buried at Eltham on 6 March 1680. His widow married as her third husband Sir John Baber, physician, on 15 February 1681, at St Bride's Church. She died in 1696 and was buried alongside Shaw at Eltham on 11 July 1696.

Parliament of England
| Preceded by Walter Yonge; Henry Hyde | Member of Parliament for Lyme Regis; 1661–1679; With: Henry Henley | Succeeded by Sir George Strode; Henry Henley |
Baronetage of England
| New creation | Baronet (of Eltham); 1665–1680 | Succeeded by John Shaw |
