= Rugge-Price baronets =

Baronetcy in the Baronetage of the United Kingdom

- Escutcheon of the Rugge-Price Baronets of Spring Grove
- Creation date: 1804
- Status: dormant
- Motto: Vive ut vivas, Live here so that you may live hereafter

The Price, later Rugge-Price Baronetcy, of Spring Grove in Richmond in the County of Surrey, is a title in the Baronetage of the United Kingdom. It was created on 2 February 1804 for Charles Price, Member of Parliament for the City of London from 1802 to 1812 and Lord Mayor of London from 1802 to 1803. The fifth Baronet assumed in 1874 by Royal licence the additional surname of Rugge. As of 28 February 2014 the present Baronet has not successfully proven his succession and is therefore not on the Official Roll of the Baronetage, with the baronetcy considered dormant since 2000.

Another member of the family to gain distinction was George Uvedale Price, grandson of the first Baronet. He was a General in the Army.

== Price, later Rugge-Price baronets, of Spring Grove (1804) ==
- Sir Charles Price, 1st Baronet (1748–1818)
- Sir Charles Price, 2nd Baronet (1776–1847)
- Sir Charles Rugge Price, 3rd Baronet (1801–1866)
- Sir Frederick Pott Price, 4th Baronet (1806–1873)
- Sir Arthur James Rugge-Price, 5th Baronet (1808–1892)
- Sir Charles Rugge-Price, 6th Baronet (1841–1927)
- Sir Charles Frederick Rugge-Price, 7th Baronet (1868–1953)
- Sir Charles James Napier Rugge-Price, 8th Baronet (1902–1966)
- Sir Charles Keith Napier Rugge-Price, 9th Baronet (1936–2000)
- Sir James Keith Peter Rugge-Price, 10th Baronet (born 1967)

The heir presumptive is the present holder's brother Andrew Philip Richard Rugge-Price (born 1970).

== See also ==
- Price baronets

== Notes ==
Baronetage of the United Kingdom
Preceded by Kay baronets	Rugge-Price baronets 2 February 1804	Succeeded by Fettes baronets
