= Best-Shaw baronets =

Title in the Baronetage of England

The Shaw, later Best-Shaw Baronetcy, of Eltham in the County of Kent, is a title in the Baronetage of England. It was created on 15 April 1665 for Sir John Shaw, Commissioner of the Customs 1660–62 and Member of Parliament for Lyme Regis 1661–79. Descended from the Shaws of Haslington Hall, Cheshire, he was a supporter of Charles I during the Civil War and provided financial support to the exiled Charles II, by whom he was knighted following the English Restoration in 1660. From 1663 he leased, from the Crown, the Manor of Eltham which included the then derelict Kings House or Eltham Palace and built a new manor house Eltham Lodge on the estate.

The fourth Baronet was High Sheriff of Kent in 1753. The eighth Baronet married Elizabeth Louisa, daughter of James Whatman Bosanquet and his wife Emily Dorothy, daughter of James Best. His son, the ninth Baronet, assumed in 1956 by Royal licence the additional surname of Best.

Charles Shaw (1785–1829), second son of the fifth Baronet and father of the seventh Baronet, was a captain in the Royal Navy

== Shaw, later Best-Shaw baronets, of Eltham (1665) ==
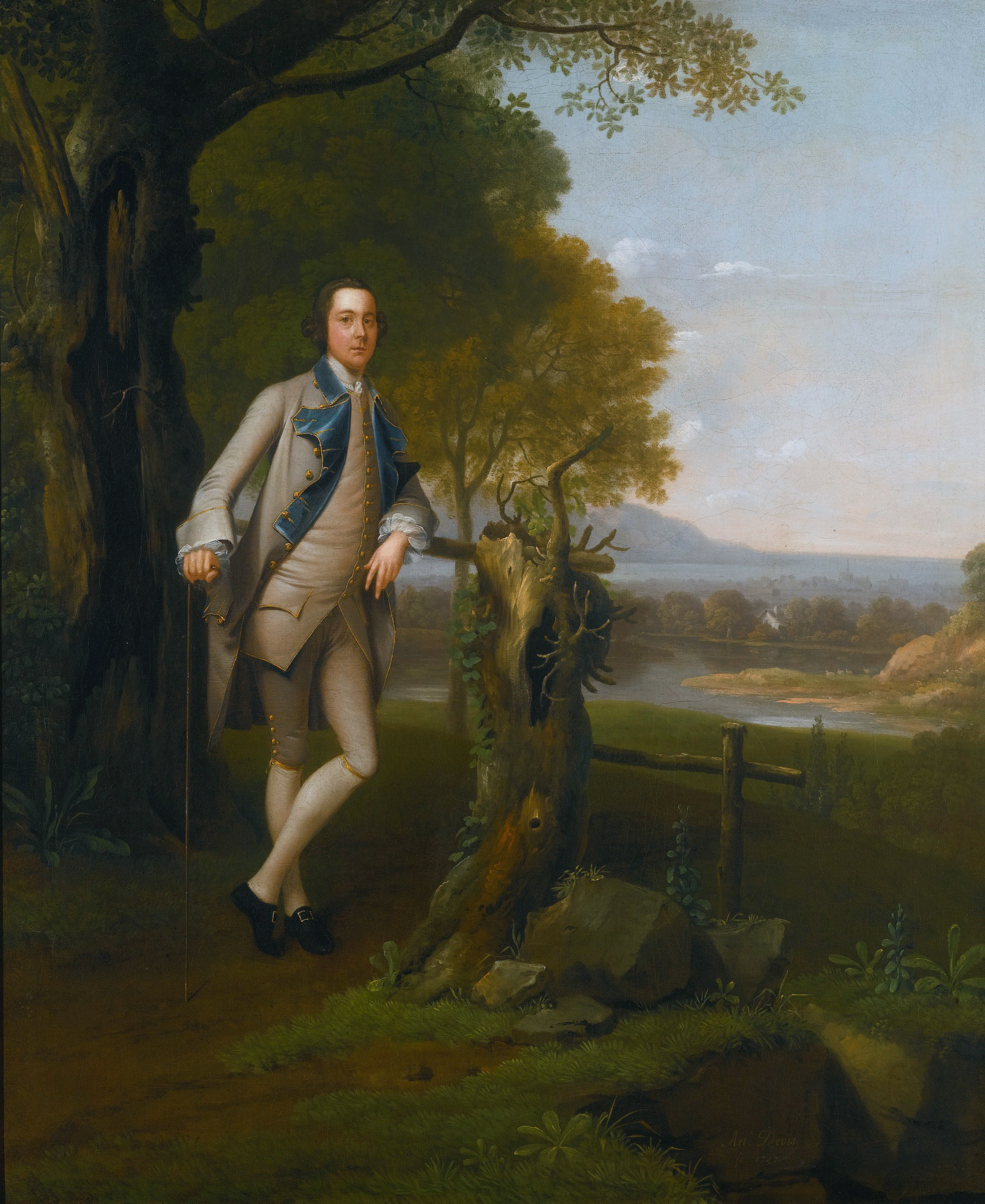
John Shaw, 4th Bt (1728–1799), of Eltham Lodge (Arthur Devis, 1757)

- Sir John Shaw, 1st Baronet (c. 1615–1680)
- Sir John Shaw, 2nd Baronet (c. 1660–1721)
- Sir John Shaw, 3rd Baronet (1687–1739)
- Sir John Shaw, 4th Baronet (1728–1779)
- Sir John Gregory Shaw, 5th Baronet (1756–1831)
- Sir John Kenward Shaw, 6th Baronet (1783–1857)
- Sir John Charles Kenward Shaw, 7th Baronet (1829–1909)
- Sir Charles John Monson Shaw, 8th Baronet (1860–1922)
- Sir John James Kenward Best-Shaw, 9th Baronet (1895–1984)
- Sir John Michael Robert Best-Shaw, 10th Baronet (1924–2014)
- Sir Thomas Joshua Best-Shaw, 11th Baronet (born 1965)

Escutcheon of the Best-Shaw baronets

The heir apparent is the present holder's eldest son Joshua John Kirkland Best-Shaw (born 1995).
