= William Lushington =

English politician (1747-1823)

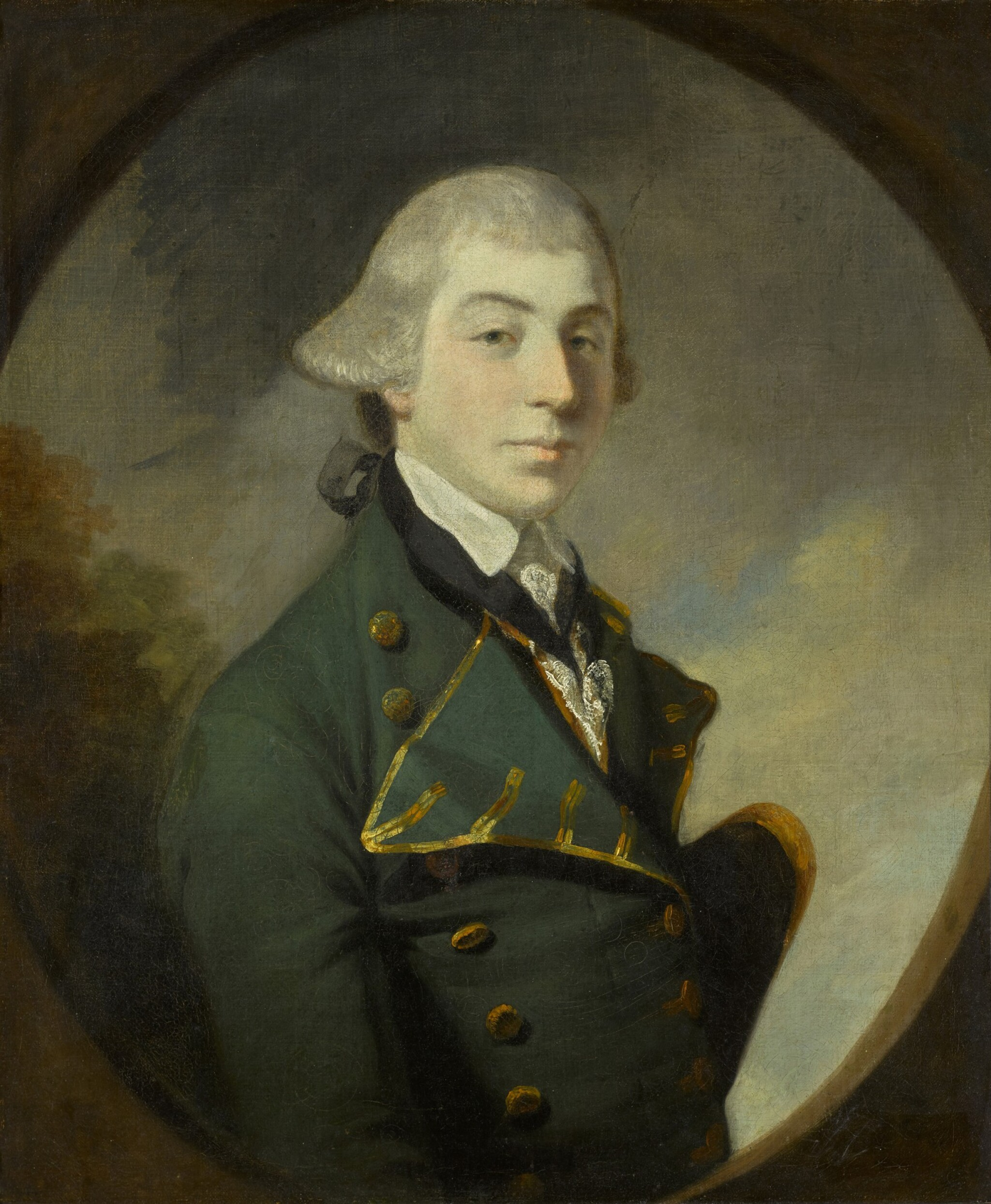
- Portrait of William Lushington (1747-1823)

Member of Parliament for the City of London
- In office 1795–1802 Serving with Watkin Lewes (1795-1796); Harvey Christian Combe (1796-1800); Sir William Curtis, 1st Baronet (1801-1802); Sir John Anderson (1801-1802)
- Preceded by: Sir John Anderson; Sir William Curtis, 1st Baronet
- Succeeded by: Sir Charles Price, 1st Baronet; Sir John Anderson; Sir William Curtis, 1st Baronet; Harvey Christian Combe

Personal details
- Born: 18 January 1747
- Died: 11 September 1823 (aged 76)

William Lushington (18 January 1747 – 11 September 1823) was a British politician and the Member of Parliament for the City of London from 1795 to 1802.

== See also ==
- List of MPs in the first United Kingdom Parliament
