= King Street, Kilmarnock =

Street in Kilmarnock, Scotland

King Street
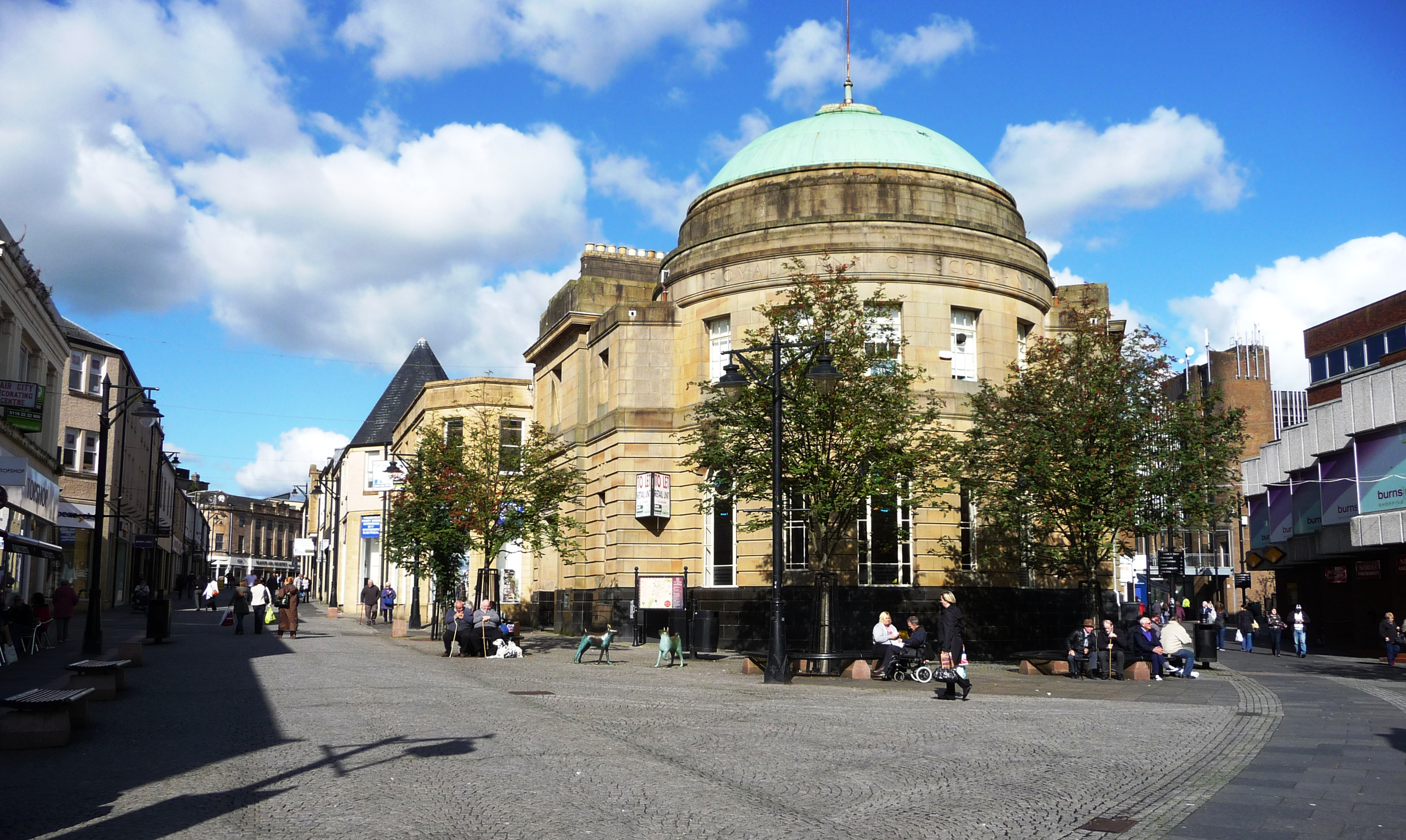
- The junction of King Street and Portland Street
- Interactive map of King Street
- Part of: Kilmarnock Cross
- Length: 0.2 mi (0.32 km)
- Location: Kilmarnock, Scotland
- Postal code: KA1
- north end: Portland Street; 55.6102°N 4.4966°W
- south end: Titchfield Street; 55.6075°N 4.4971°W

Construction
- Completion: 1804
- Demolished: 1970s (partly)

King Street is the principal business street in Kilmarnock, East Ayrshire, Scotland. King Street runs from the Kilmarnock Cross over the Kilmarnock Water and on to the junction with Titchfield Street. In recent years, proposals have surfaced to demolish some of the privately owned premises on King Street in order to open the street up to views of the Kilmarnock Water. Modern sculptures by Shona Kinloch currently line King Street.

== History ==
King Street was constructed from the Kilmarnock Cross southwards towards the area of Riccarton. King Street becomes known as Titchfield Street after the Fowlds Street junction. It first opened in 1804 at the same period New Bridge was constructed over the Kilmarnock Water. Kilmarnock Town Hall was constructed on King Street between 1804–1805. King Street Church once stood on the street, constructed on top of the Kilmarnock Water, before being demolished. Two bronze head sculptures wearing swimming goggles currently stand nearby the site, paying homage to the Kilmarnock Water being situated underneath.

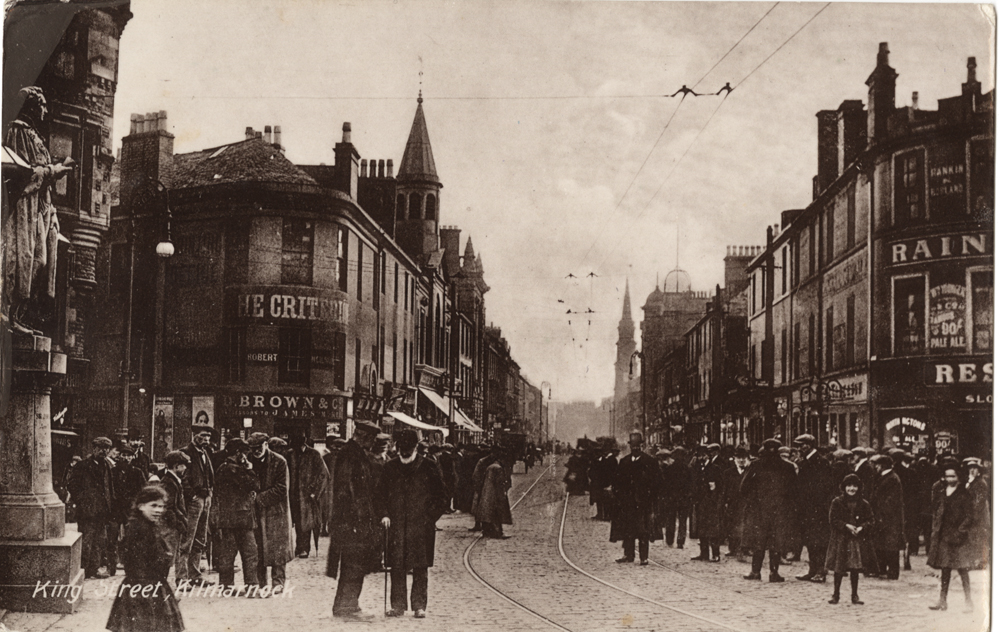
King Street in 1900

Many historic buildings in King Street (including the Town House and the King Street Church) were demolished during the redevelopments in the 1970's to 1980's. These buildings were replaced by modern architecture which stand in their place today. The demolition of the eastern side of King Street was criticised in a report commissioned by East Ayrshire Council for the effect it had on the historical and architectural heritage of the area.

At one point, King Street was home to notable businesses, including Lauders (later House of Fraser in 1972, before closing in 2002), Woolworths, Granton's, Cable's Menswear, Clarks, the Royal Bank of Scotland, Lamont & Co Ltd, Robertson & Davidson's, G. & W. Morton's and Lewis's.

Today, King Street remains the centre of Kilmarnock town centre, and is home to retailers such as Marks and Spencer, New Look, Semi Chem, Sports Direct and River Island. On 14 July 2025, a large scale fire destroyed a listed building on King Street which contained Bonmarche, a local tattoo shop and a cafe. The fire lasted for two days, and the building was confirmed for demolition due to its structural collapse making it unsafe.

== Streets from King Street ==
=== Portland Street ===
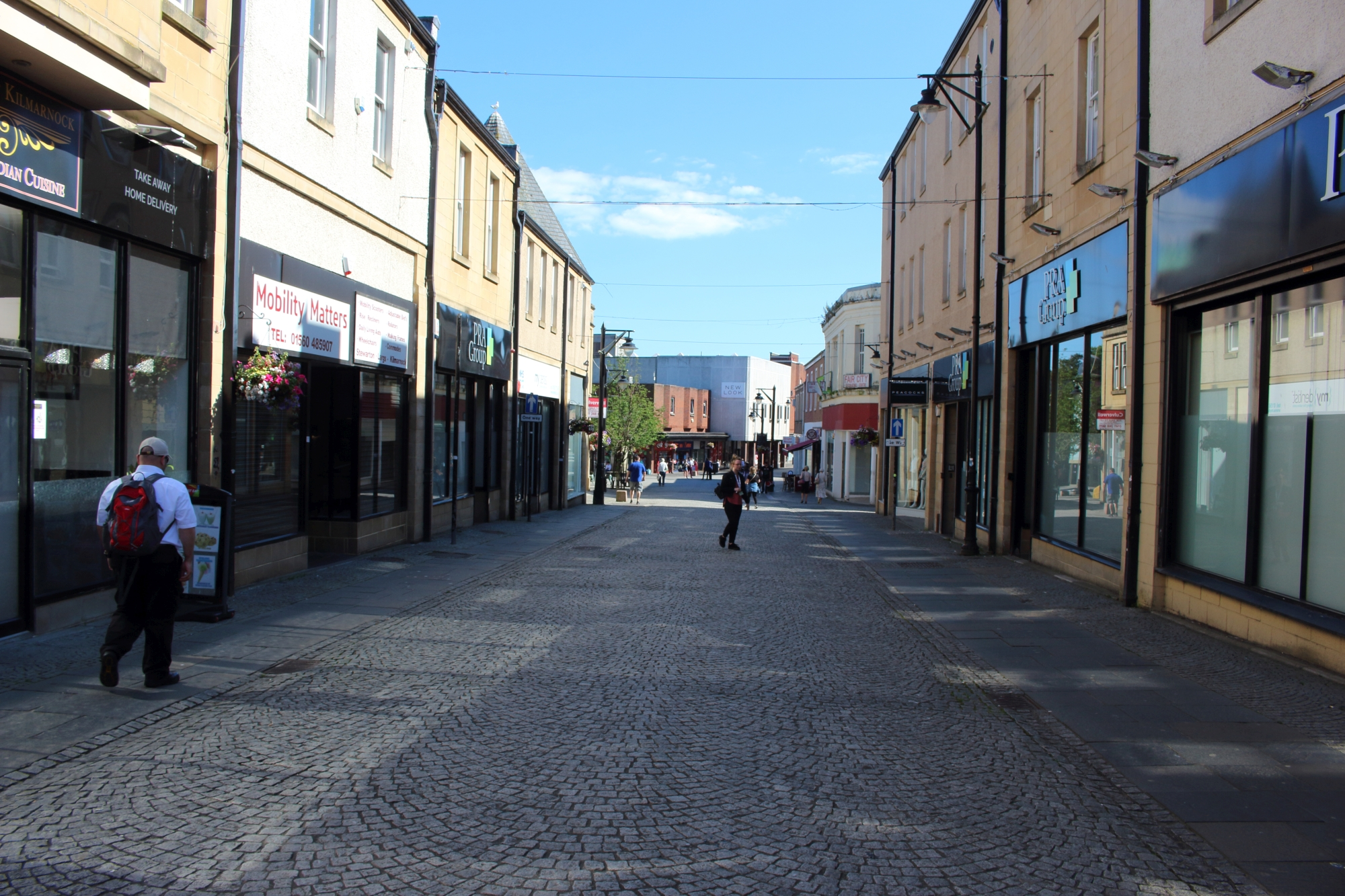
Portland Street in 2019

Portland Street, to the north of King Street, dates from roughly 1816 after sections being constructed in order to establish a new road into Kilmarnock from Glasgow and other places situated to the north of the town. The street was named in recognition of a local landowner, William Bentinck, 4th Duke of Portland. Developments on Portland Street were originally slow to develop, such as the George Hotel situated on Portland Street was originally offered for let in 1823, and the Western Scottish Omnibus depot opened on Portland Street in 1923. It closed in 1974 following the construction of a new bus station to serve the town at the Foregate. The Western Scottish Omnibus depot was demolished in 1979.

The red sandstone and highly ornamented building of John Craig & Sons furniture warehouse situated on Portland Street is described as "one of Kilmarnock's finest buildings" and was designed by architect firm Andrew & Newlands.

=== Duke Street ===
Prior to the 1970s redevelopment of much of King Street, Duke Street was considered one of Kilmarnock's most impressive thoroughfares, extending from Kilmarnock Cross towards the London Road area of the town. Prior to the street being cut through, the site was originally Nailer's Close and David's Lane. Prior, traffic entering Kilmarnock along London Road would require to travel down Green Street and along the narrow Waterloo Street in order to reach both Kilmarnock Cross and King Street. The Town Improvement Trust proposed for a new wider and direct access route to both streets, with the project being planned by Willian Railton, an architect from Kilmarnock. Duke Street was originally opened on 25 November 1859 by Provost Archibald Finnie.

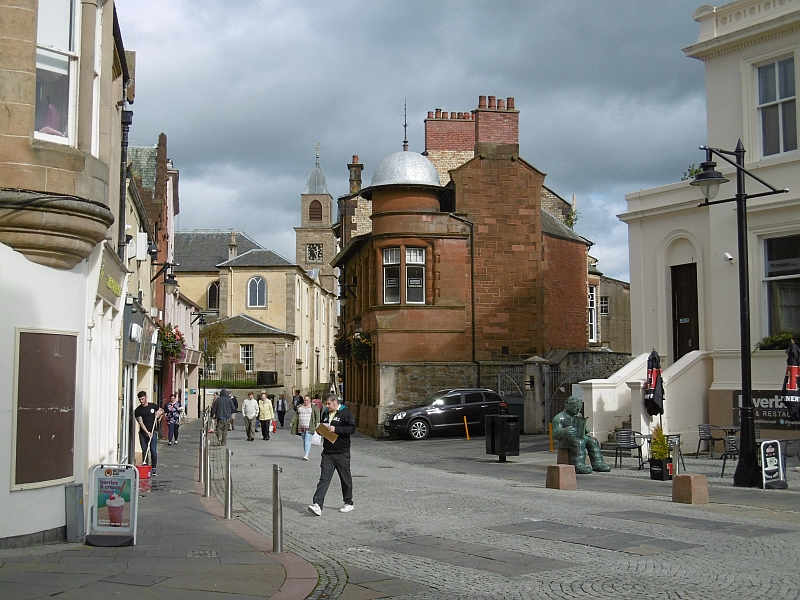
Bank Street in 2015

Originally, Duke Street was to be named Victoria Street, however, at the official opening of the street, Provost Finnie named the street after the Duke of Portland instead. During the 1970s redevelopment of the area which saw the introduction of a one way system traffic flow around Kilmarnock town centre, Duke Street was demolished in its entirety. The Burns Mall Shopping Centre was later constructed on the site of the former Duke Street, with the original line of Duke Street remaining through the shopping centre in order to link the pedestrian underpass situated at the Palace Theatre to the Kilmarnock Cross.

=== Strand Street ===
Strand Street is an foldaway roadway in the centre of Kilmarnock to the east of King Street. Strand Street is recognised as "one of the earliest streets of the town". It is noted as being the first street in Kilmarnock to be paved using rounded stones which were taken from the river in 1708 to be used for paving the road.

=== Bank Street ===
Bank Street is one of the oldest streets of Kilmarnock, originally linking Dundonald Road and the route southward towards Kilmarnock Cross, although the last short stretch of road is known as Cheapside Street.
