= Sir Charles Price, 1st Baronet =

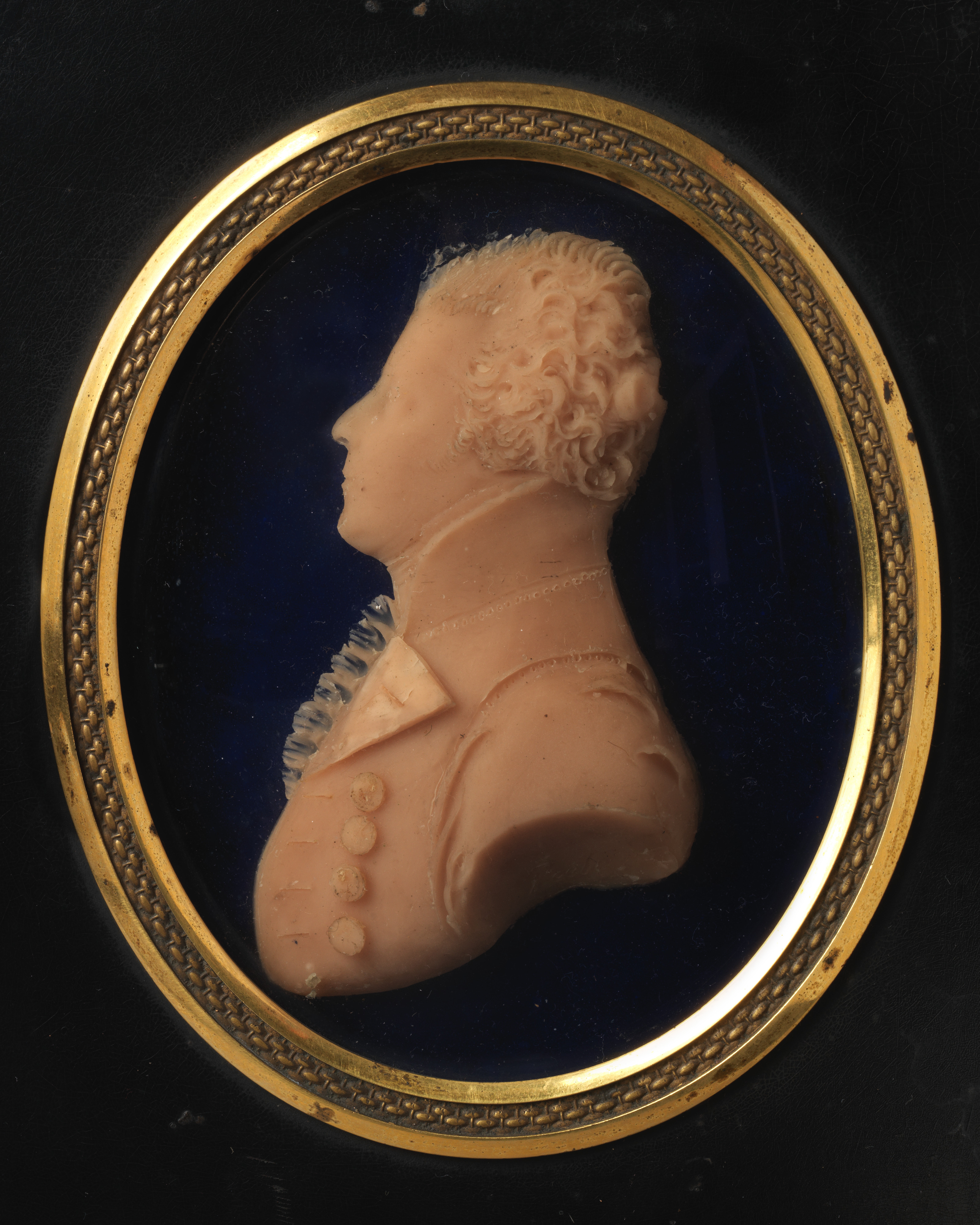

Sir Charles Price, 1st Baronet (25 January 1747 – 19 July 1818) was a merchant in the City of London, shipowner, Lord Mayor of London and politician.

== Life and career ==
Price was the son of the Rev. Ralph Price, incumbent of Farnborough, Berkshire, and his wife Sarah Richardson. He was sent to the city of London, at a young age under the care of an uncle, who lived on Snow Hill. Price was a rum and brandy merchant and shipowner with four vessels involved in South Sea whaling. He became a wealthy oil-man and banker.

On 16 December 1773, at St Michael's, Burleigh Street, Westminster, he married Mary Rugge, with whom he obtained a considerable fortune.

In 1797, he was chosen as alderman of the ward of Farringdon-Without and served as sheriff in 1799. In 1802, he was chosen one of the four Members of Parliament (MPs) for the city of London. In 1803 he became Lord Mayor of London and on 2 February 1804 he was created a baronet. He was reelected to parliament in 1806, and 1807, but in 1812, he declined to be placed on the list of candidates. As a legislator, he seldom or ever spoke in parliament, but, like his colleague, Sir William Curtis, was a strenuous admirer, and constant supporter of Pitt's administration. He was also a magistrate, Colonel of the Fifth Regiment of Volunteers, Governor of the tackle-house and ticket-porters and president of the Commercial Traveller's Society.

Price died at his house, Spring-Grove, Richmond, on 19 July 1818, after a long decline in health .

Parliament of the United Kingdom
Preceded by Sir John Anderson, Bt; William Lushington; Harvey Christian Combe; Sir William Curtis, Bt	Member of Parliament for City of London; 1802 – 1812; With: Sir John Anderson, Bt 1802–1806; Sir William Curtis, Bt 1802–1812; Harvey Christian Combe 1802–1812; Sir James Shaw 1806–1812	Succeeded by John Atkins; Harvey Christian Combe; Sir James Shaw, Bt; Sir William Curtis, Bt
Baronetage of the United Kingdom
New creation	Baronet (of Spring Grove); 1804–1818	Succeeded by Charles Price
