= George Hotel, Kilmarnock =

George Hotel
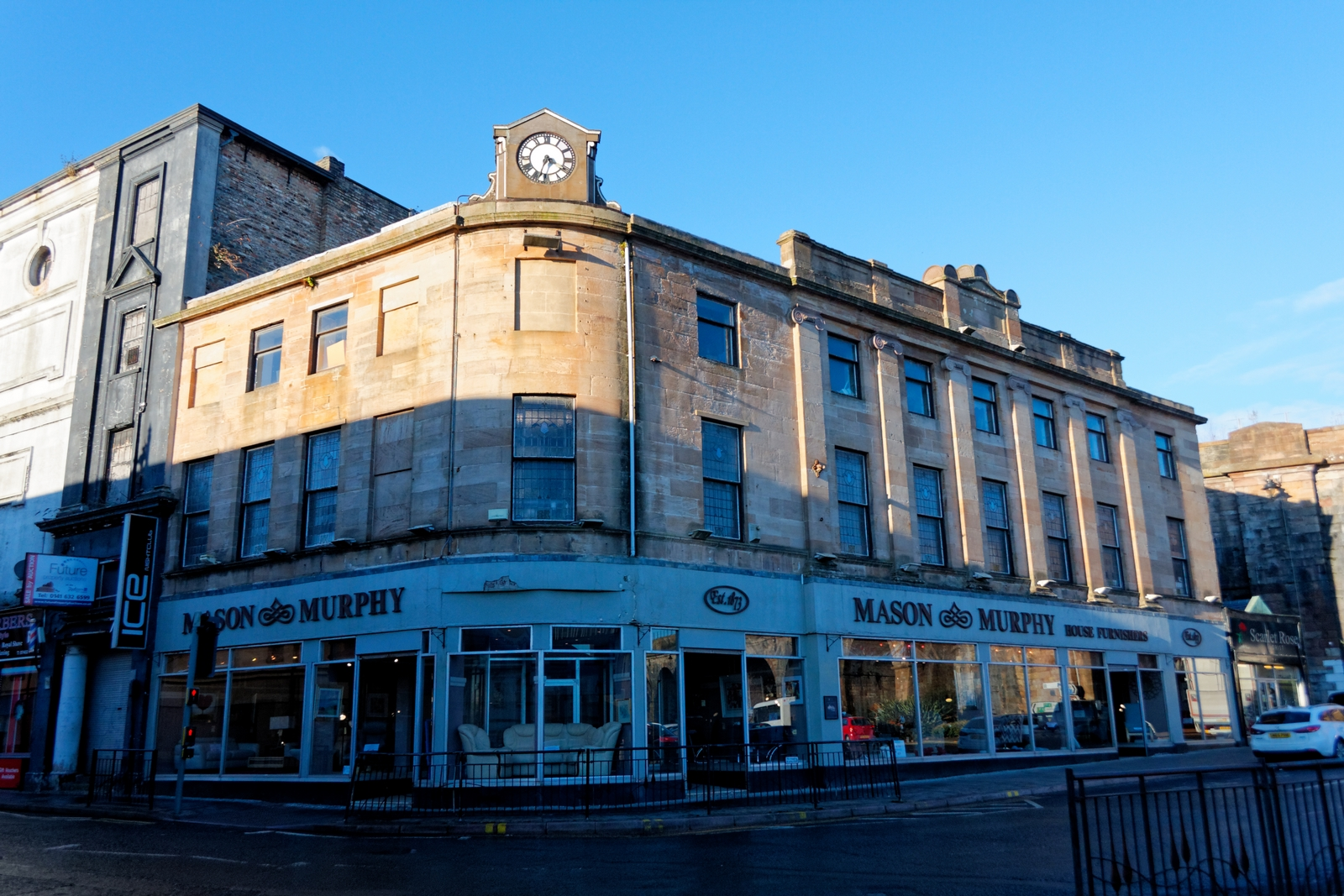
- The George Hotel building, now serving as Mason Murphy Home Furnishings
- Interactive map of the George Hotel area
- Hotel chain: Kilmarnock Burgh Council

General information
- Location: 78–80 Portland Street, Kilmarnock, KA1 1JG
- Coordinates: 55.61176°N 4.49708°W
- Year built: 1823
- Opened: 1824 (as the George Inn)
- Closed: 1922
- Owner: Merchants' Company of Kilmarnock (until 1849); Mason Murphy (1970s–present)

Technical details
- Material: Polished yellow Sandstone
- Floor count: 4

Other information
- Number of restaurants: 1
- Number of bars: 1

The George Hotel is a former 5–star hotel located in Kilmarnock, Scotland. The building, on the corner of Portland Street, was completed in 1823 and opened the following year as The George Inn. The building was designated a Category B Listed building by Historic Environment Scotland in 1980.

Following its opening, the hotel was one of the top in Ayrshire, and served as a hub for important functions hosted by the Kilmarnock Burgh Council. Following the closure of the hotel in 1920, there were plans for the hotel to be demolished when the Town Council purchased the property, but the plans were eventually shelved. The same year as the George Hotel closed, part of the building was adapted and used as the George Cinema.

== George Hotel ==
=== Origins ===
The George Hotel was erected at the corner of George Street and Portland Street in Kilmarnock in 1823. It is widely speculated that Glaswegian architect John Thomson designed the building due to its distinguishable six iconic pilasters and public clock over the curved facade of the building. It had previously been owned by William Wallace and Co who owned both the George Hotel and the building for a period of time in the 19th century.

The building was originally a coaching inn with posting facilities available, with the hotel serving as the towns premier location for accommodation. In June 1849, the hotel was sold by the Merchants' Company of Kilmarnock. The hotel had a large function room, and given its superiority to the town hall, was often used for hosting civic receptions.

=== Later years and closure ===
Kilmarnock Burgh Council held a special dinner and reception at the George Hotel in order to confer the Freedom of Kilmarnock to Andrew Fisher, the Prime Minister of Australia, who was born in Crosshouse. The hotel closed in 1920 and was subsequently converted into commercial premises.

== Post–George Hotel ==
The three-story building still remains today, looking similar to the way it did when it operated as the George Hotel. The former function hall and part of the building was reconstructed as the George Cinema which opened in 1923, whilst another part of the building was repurposed as Alex Lind & Co clothing and soft goods store. The building is largely occupied by Mason Murphy Furniture Retailers, which was founded in 1873. As part of a 1968 commissioned by Kilmarnock Town Council to regenerate the town centre, the George Hotel building was scheduled to be demolished in order to create a straight through road as part of a new one way system which was being erected through the town.

The building was not demolished as a result of this part of the plan being scrapped, despite the one way system around Kilmarnock town centre being implemented. As a result of the building not being demolished, a tight bend around the one way system at Portland Street was created, something the planners originally had not intended and would not have been created if the building were demolished. The building is used by Mason Murphy as a furniture shop, who took over the ownership of the building in the early 1970s after their original Regent Street shop was served with a Compulsory Purchase Order in order to be demolished as part of the Kilmarnock town centre regeneration to erect the Kilmarnock Centre Shopping Mall. The rest of the property not occupied by Mason Murphy had various degrees of use, most recently having been a disco until 2014.

Historic Environment Scotland has described the building as "one of the few remaining historic buildings in Portland Street" following a comprehensive redevelopment of the town centre during the 1960s.

== Notable residents ==
- Woodrow Wilson - stayed at the hotel on 5 July 1899.
- Andrew Carnegie, industrialist and philanthropist
- Andrew Fisher, Prime Minister of Australia
- Charles Ewart, soldier of the Royal Scots Greys

== See also ==
- Portland Street; the street in Kilmarnock in which the building is situated
