= Shaw baronets of Kilmarnock (second creation, 1813) =

The Shaw baronetcy, of Kilmarnock in the County of Ayr, was created in the Baronetage of the United Kingdom on 21 September 1809 for James Shaw, Lord Mayor of London in 1805 and Member of Parliament for the City of London, with normal remainder to the heirs male of his body. He obtained a second patent on 14 January 1813 with remainder to his nephew, John Shaw. On Shaw's death in 1843, he was succeeded in the 1813 creation according to the special remainder by his nephew, the 2nd Baronet. On the latter's death in 1868 this creation became extinct as well.

== Shaw baronets, of Kilmarnock (1813) ==
- Sir James Shaw, 1st Baronet (1764–1843)
- Sir John Shaw, 2nd Baronet (c. 1788–1868)
