= William Staines =

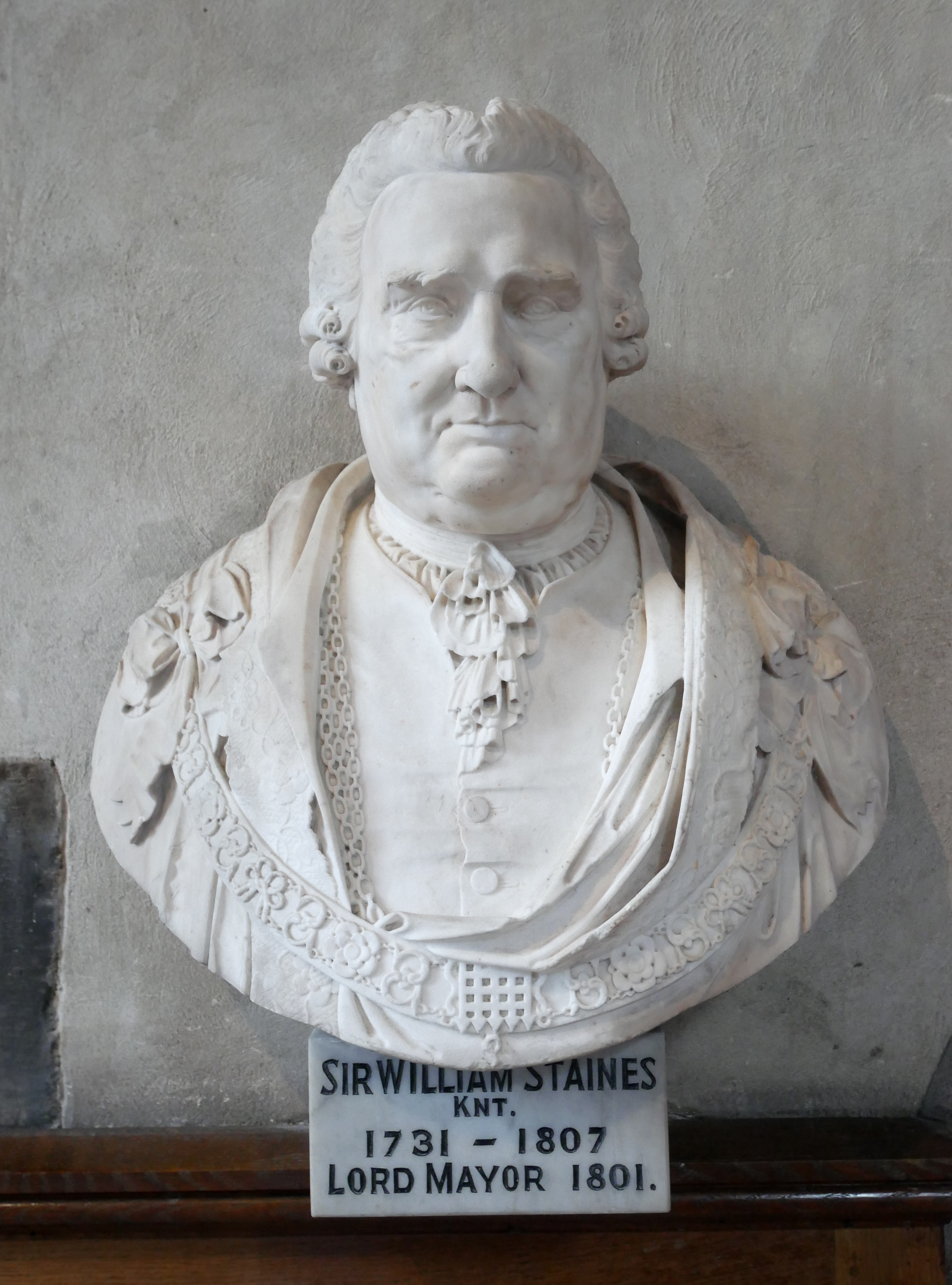
Bust in St Giles-without-Cripplegate, London

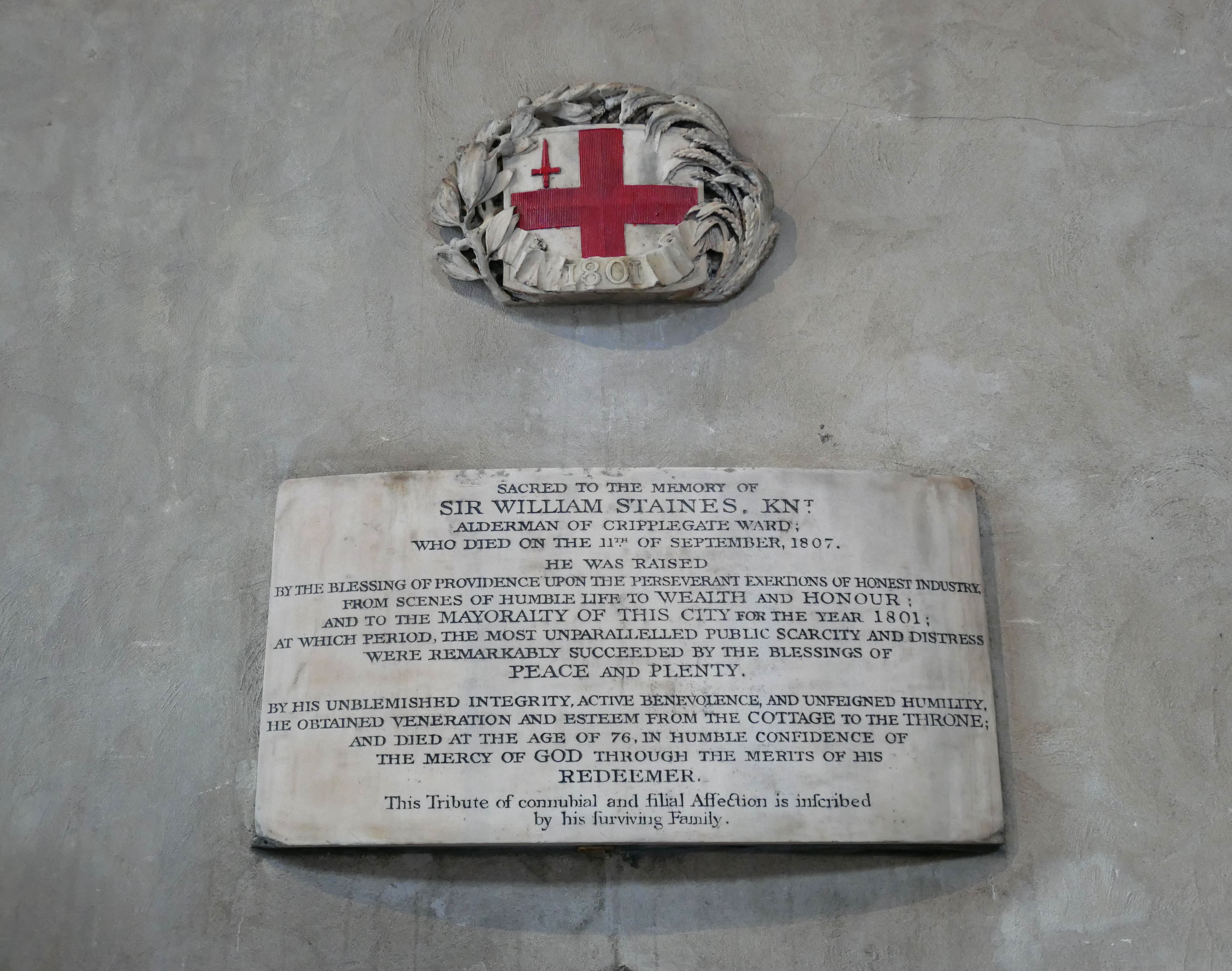
Plaque in St Giles-without-Cripplegate, London

Sir William Staines (1731 - 11 September 1807) was a builder and Lord Mayor of London for the year 1800 to 1801.

Staines began life as a bricklayer's labourer and in time accumulated a vast fortune. He became a Freeman of the Carpenter's Company. In 1783, he became a Common Councillor of Cripplegate ward of which he was Deputy from 1791 to 1793. He was elected Alderman of Cripplegate on 10 April 1793, and also became Master of the Carpenters Company from 1793 to 1794. In spite of being illiterate and a sort of butt amongst his fellow Aldermen, he was chosen as Sheriff of London for the year 1796 to 1797 and was knighted on 26 October 1796. He was Master of the Carpenters Company again for the year 1798 to 1799 and was Lord Mayor of London for the year 1800 to 1801.

In 1786, Staines built nine houses Jacob's Well Passage for his aged and indigent friends. He also built Barbican Chapel, and rebuilt the "Jacob's Well" public-house, noted for dramatic representations. An account of his early life was printed in the European Magazine for November, 1807. A painting of Staines by William Beechey hangs in the Guildhall Art Gallery.

Civic offices
Preceded by Harvey Christian Combe	Lord Mayor of London; 1800-1801	Succeeded by John Eamer
