= Sir William Curtis, 1st Baronet =

English merchant, banker, and politician (1752–1829)

Sir William Curtis Bt
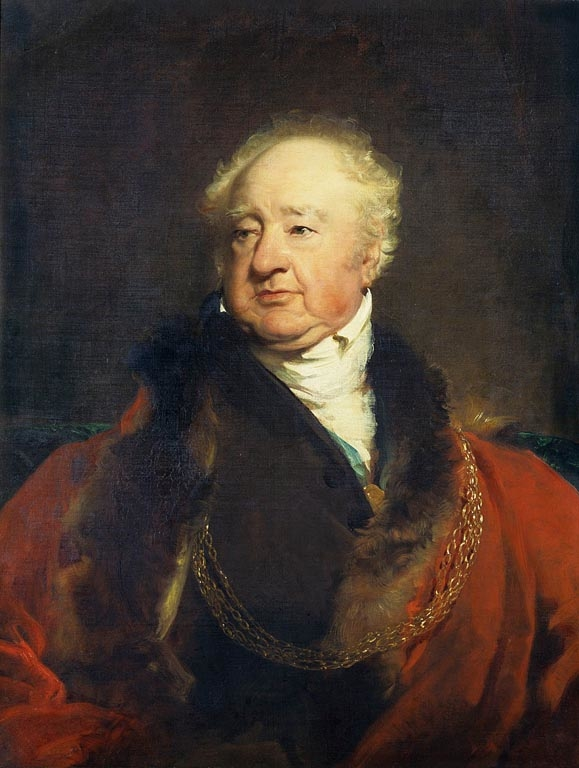
- portrait by Sir Thomas Lawrence, 1823-1824
- Born: 25 January 1752; Wapping, London, England, United Kingdom
- Died: 18 January 1829 (aged 76); England, United Kingdom
- Occupations: Businessman, banker, politician

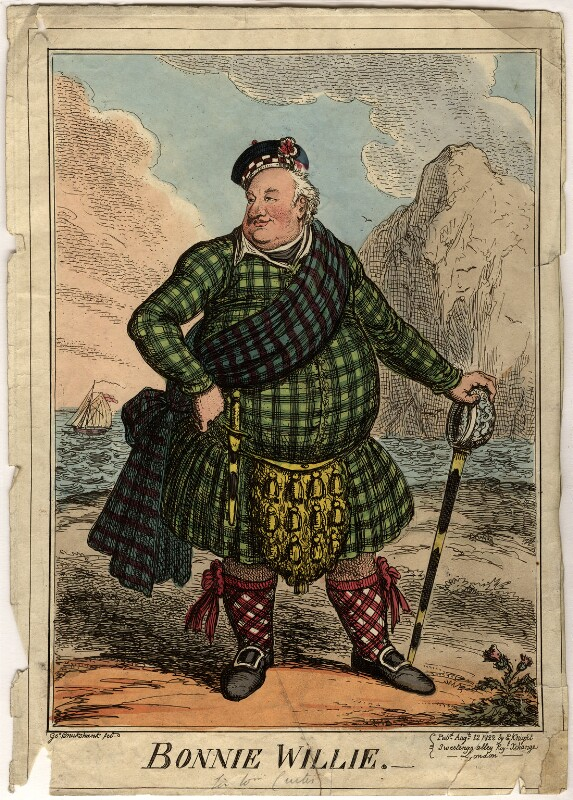
Sir William Curtis, 1st Baronet as Bonnie Willie. George Cruikshank, 1822.

Sir William Curtis, 1st Baronet (25 January 1752 – 18 January 1829) was an English merchant, banker, and politician. Although he had a long political and business career (the two significantly intertwined), he was probably best known for the banquets he hosted.

== Life ==
Born in Wapping, London, Curtis was the son of a sea biscuit manufacturer, Joseph Curtis, and his wife Mary Tennant. The family business was making ship's biscuit and other dry provisions for the Royal Navy. They were also shipowners whose vessels carried convicts to Australia and engaged in South Sea whaling.

A lifelong Tory, he was elected as a Member of Parliament for the City of London at the 1790 general election. He held the seat continuously for 28 years until his defeat at the 1818 general election. He was returned to the Commons in February 1819 at a by-election for Bletchingley, and at the 1820 general election he was returned again for the City of London. He did not contest London again at the 1826 election, when he was returned for Hastings. He resigned that seat later the same year.

Curtis was also Alderman of the city, becoming Sheriff of London in 1788 and Lord Mayor in 1795–96. He was known for the lavish banquets he gave at his estate, Cullands Grove. He was created a Baronet of Cullonds Grove in 1802.

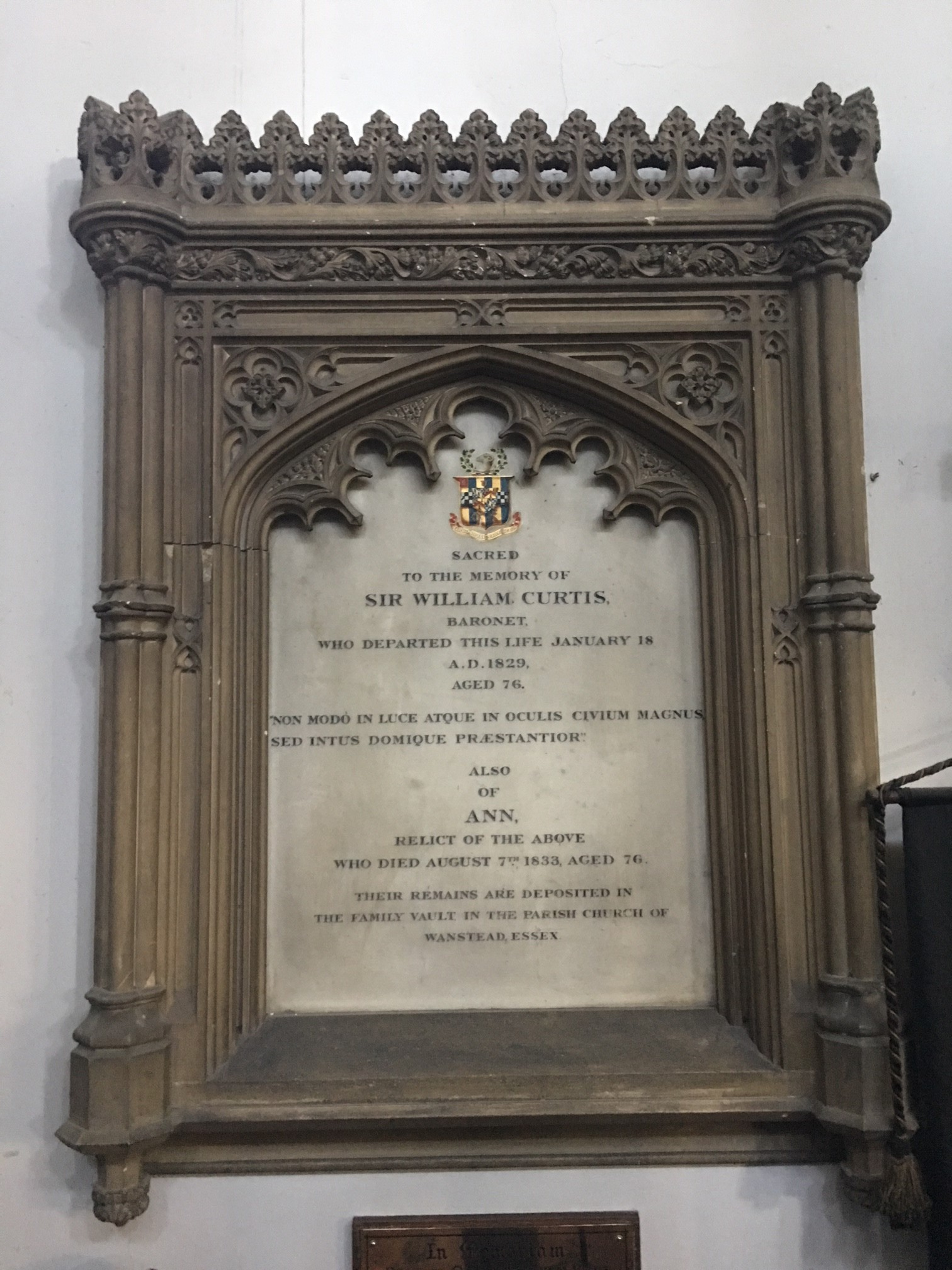
Memorial to Sir William Curtis in St George's Church, Ramsgate, Kent

Curtis died in 1829. His estate sale ran for a week, and included 370 dozen bottles of wine, port, claret, East India Madeira, sherry (Wild's), Malaga, Hock, and beer.

== See also ==
- Lady Penrhyn, a slave ship part-owned by Curtis that carried convicts in the First Fleet to New South Wales in 1788.
- Curtis Island, New Zealand, one of the Kermadec Islands named after Curtis by the Lady Penryn.
- Butterworth Squadron, a whaling and maritime fur trading expedition to the Pacific Ocean in 1792, of which Curtis was a principal investor.

Parliament of Great Britain
Preceded by Nathaniel Newnham; John Sawbridge; Sir Watkin Lewes; Brook Watson	Member of Parliament for the City of London; 1790 – 1800; With: John Sawbridge to 1795; Brook Watson to 1793; Sir Watkin Lewes to 1796; John Anderson from 1793; William Lushington from 1795; Harvey Christian Combe from 1796	Succeeded by Parliament of the United Kingdom
Parliament of the United Kingdom
Preceded by Parliament of Great Britain	Member of Parliament for the City of London; 1801 – 1818; With: William Lushington to 1802; John Anderson to 1806; Harvey Christian Combe to 1817; Sir Charles Price, Bt 1802–12; Sir James Shaw, Bt 1806–18; John Atkins 1812–18; Matthew Wood	Succeeded by Thomas Wilson; Robert Waithman; John Thomas Thorp; Matthew Wood
Preceded by Matthew Russell; George Tennyson	Member of Parliament for Bletchingley; Feb 1819 – 1820; With: George Tennyson; Marquess of Titchfield	Succeeded by Edward Henry Edwardes; Marquess of Titchfield
Preceded by Thomas Wilson; Robert Waithman; John Thomas Thorp; Matthew Wood	Member of Parliament for City of London; 1826 – 1826; With: George Bridges; Thomas Wilson; Matthew Wood	Succeeded by William Thompson; Robert Waithman; William Ward; Matthew Wood
Preceded by James Dawkins; William Scott	Member of Parliament for Hastings; Jun 1826 – Nov 1826; With: Sir Charles Wetherell	Succeeded by Evelyn Denison; James Lushington
Civic offices
Preceded by Thomas Skinner	Lord Mayor of London; 1795–1796	Succeeded by Brook Watson
Baronetage of the United Kingdom
New creation	Baronet (of Cullands Grove); 1802–1829	Succeeded by William Curtis
