= Harvey Christian Combe =

British politician (1752–1818)

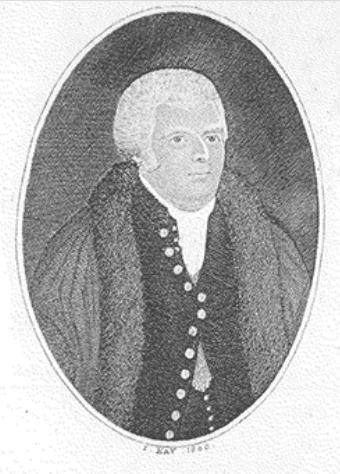
Harvey Christian Combe by John Kay

Harvey Christian Combe (1752 – 4 July 1818) was an English Whig politician. He was the eldest surviving son of Harvey Combe, attorney, of Andover, Hampshire. He served as Lord Mayor of London 1799/1800.

== Life ==
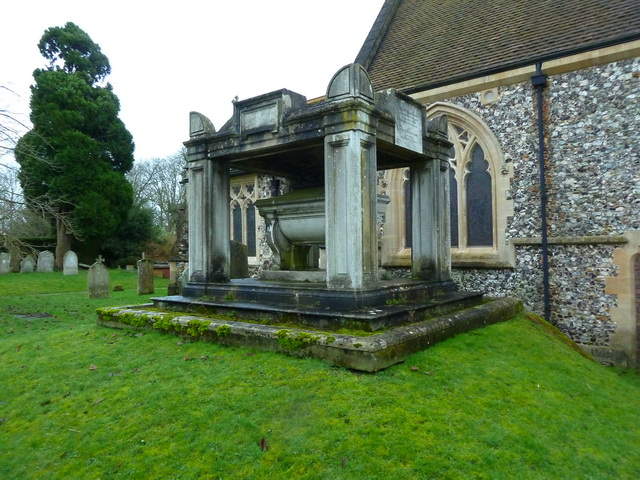
Combe's tomb at the Parish Church of St Andrew, Cobham

He was born in Andover, Hampshire the eldest son of Harvey Combe, a wealthy lawyer, and his wife Christiana Cornhill. Inheriting a large sum he moved to London and worked as a corn merchant, before going to work for a brewery, Gyfford & Co. Marrying Alice Christian Tree, his cousin, he inherited a large sum on the death of her father Boyce Tree, and set up a brewery with his brother-in-law Joseph Dellafield named "Combe Delafield and Co." on Castle Street in Long Acre, gaining a good reputation as a fine brewer.

He was elected an Alderman of London in 1790 and Lord Mayor of London in 1799. He was appointed Sheriff of London for 1791–92. At the 1796 general election he was elected as a Member of Parliament for the City of London.

In his role as Lord Mayor one of his most memorable duties was a dinner in honour of Horatio Nelson at which Combe presented Nelson with an ornate sword.

Combe was present in the House of Commons when the then Prime Minister, Spencer Perceval, was assassinated in the lobby on 11 May 1812. He chaired a makeshift court convened the same day composed of MPs who were, like himself, also magistrates in order to begin committal proceedings against the murderer, John Bellingham, take witness statements and order messengers to search Bellingham's lodgings. Bellingham was ultimately hanged.

He held the seat for 21 years, until he resigned from the House of Commons in June 1817 by taking the Chiltern Hundreds.

He fell ill in May 1817 and absented himself from parliament. He died at Cobham Park in Surrey on 4 July 1818, aged 66.

His son took over the brewery which later merged to become Watney Combe & Reid.

== Family ==
He had married his cousin Alice Christian Tree (d.1828), the daughter of Boyce Tree, corn factor, of London, with whom he had four sons and six daughters. By 1806 he was very rich, having made a fortune in the brewing industry. He was a partner in the Combe Delafield and Co. brewery. In 1806 he bought Cobham Park in Surrey where he lived until his death. He built Cobham Park into a substantial country house and estate which upon his death was left to his son Harvey Combe, junior. The house was sold in 1987 and is now apartments, but parts of the estate still belong to the Combe family.

== Other positions of note ==
- Lt Colonel of the West London Militia 1794–1796
- Captain of the Aldgate Volunteers 1798
- Master of the Worshipful Company of Brewers 1804–1805
- Director of the Globe Insurance Co 1805–1817
- Governor of the Irish Society of London 1806–1817
- Director of the West India Docks 1811–1817
- warden of the Worshipful Company of Fishmongers 1812–1814
- President of the Society for the Prosecution of Felons 1817

== Notes ==
- "COMBE, Harvey Christian (1752-1818), of Cross Street, London and Cobham Park, Surr". History of Parliament Online.

Parliament of Great Britain
Preceded by Sir Watkin Lewes; Sir John Anderson, Bt; William Lushington; Sir William Curtis, Bt	Member of Parliament for the City of London; 1796–1800; With: Sir John Anderson, Bt; William Lushington; Sir William Curtis, Bt	Succeeded by Parliament of the United Kingdom
Parliament of the United Kingdom
Preceded by Parliament of Great Britain	Member of Parliament for the City of London; 1801–1817; With: Sir William Curtis, Bt to 1818; Sir John Anderson, Bt to 1806; William Lushington to 1802; Sir Charles Price, Bt 1802–12; Sir James Shaw, Bt 1806–18; John Atkins 1812–18	Succeeded by Sir Matthew Wood; Sir William Curtis, Bt; Sir James Shaw, Bt; John Atkins
Civic offices
Preceded by Sir Richard Glyn	Lord Mayor of London; 1799–1800	Succeeded by Sir William Staines
