= Kilmarnock Cross =

Public square in Kilmarnock, East Ayrshire, Scotland

Coordinates: 55°36′36.2″N 4°29′47.4″W

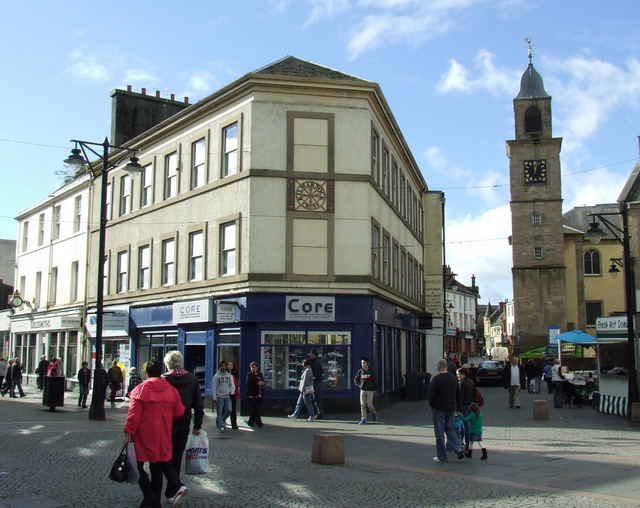
Kilmarnock Cross

Kilmarnock Cross is a public square in Kilmarnock, East Ayrshire, Scotland . In Rambles Around Kilmarnock (1875) Archibald R Adamson described it as "most spacious, although of a most peculiar form, having no less than seven streets branching off it. In the centre stands a marble statue of Sir James Shaw, who rose from a humble position to that of Lord Mayor of London", the square is part of the area nicknamed "the town" by locals.

The seven streets (in clockwise order starting from the north) were Portland Street, Fore Street, Regent Street, Duke Street, Waterloo Street, King Street and Bank Street, and just north of Bank Street, but opening more on to Portland Street than the Cross itself, Croft Street. The heavy traffic in the town led to redevelopments in the 1970s which saw all traffic through this area of the town being stopped completely.

== History ==
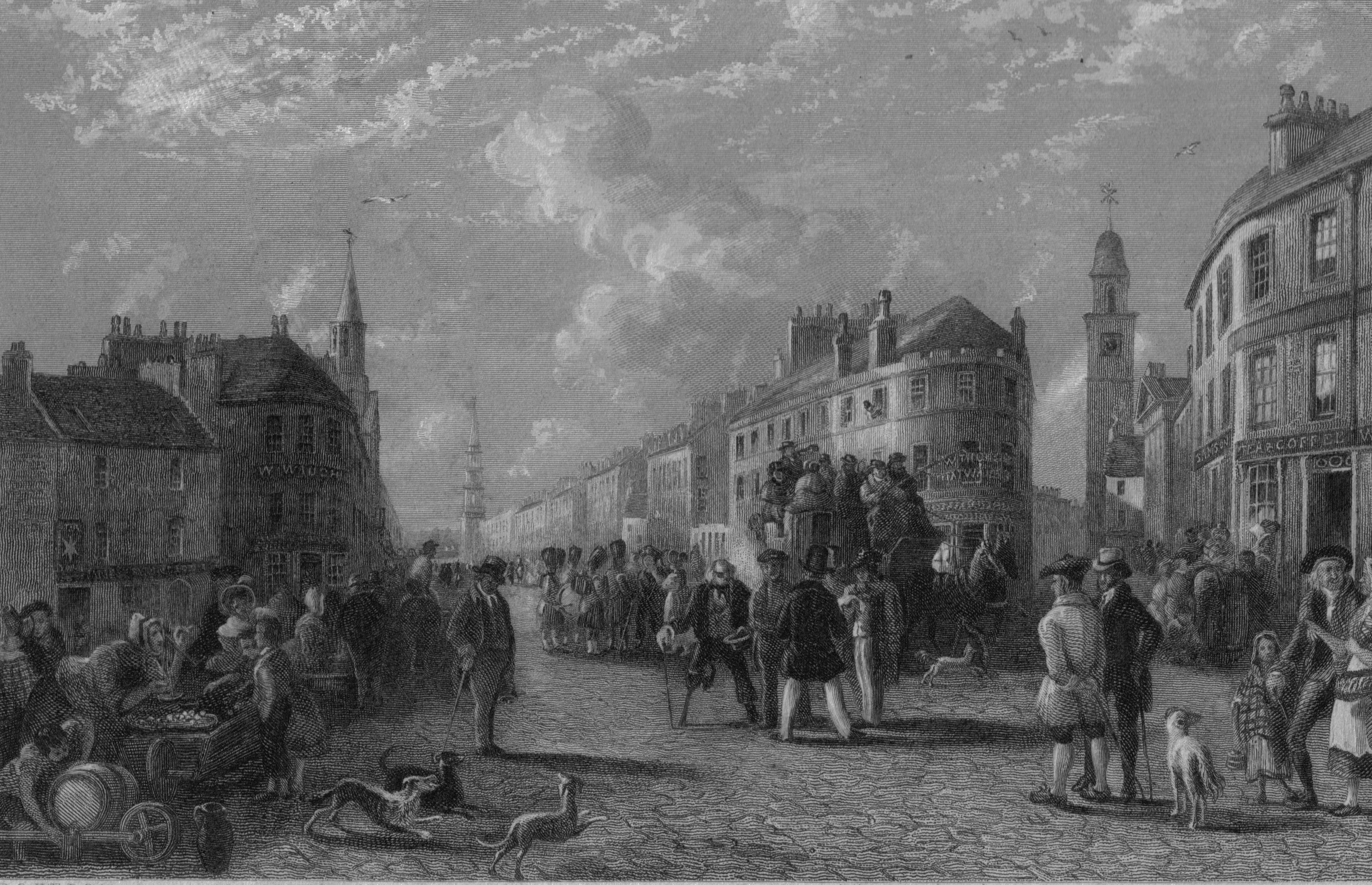
Kilmarnock Cross in 1849

Kilmarnock Cross is the recognised centre of the town of Kilmarnock and was the site to the original marketplace and the old gallows, however, it is speculated that it would only come into use once the Covenanters were executed. The town of Kilmarnock grew from the cross with six different streets departing from it in six directions which saw the cross become a busy junction. In order to try and control traffic flow around the area, several methods were used, including a roundabout at one point. In 1975, Kilmarnock Cross was permanently closed to all traffic and later became a pedestrianised area.

A complete redevelopment of the town in the 1970s saw some of the streets demolished, including Duke Street, Fore Street, Regent Street and Waterloo Street. Shops were built along the line of Fore Street's northern end becoming the Foregate, the Burns shopping mall covering the old Duke Street area, and the bus station and a multi-storey car park replaced the Regent Street area.

== Statues ==
The statue of Jimmy Shaw was at the Cross from 1848 - 1929, when it was removed and placed at London Road. In the town today there are statues placed on King Street to signify where the water runs under the streets. Another statue has been placed at the Cross now that it is free of traffic. The statue is of Robert Burns and John Wilson, the printer of Burns' First Edition.

== Associated streets ==
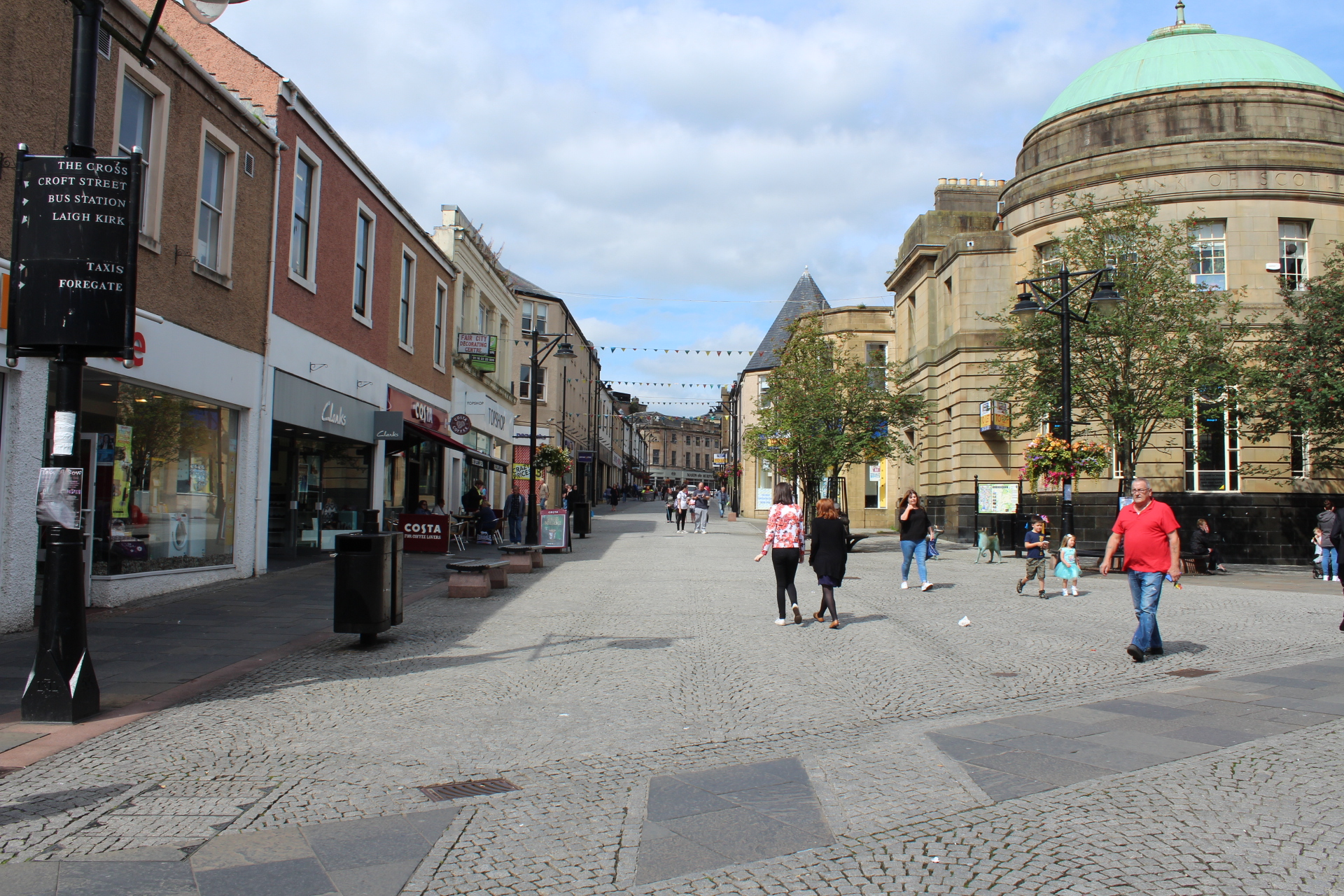
Portland Street, 2016

=== King Street ===
King Street opened in 1804. It runs from the Cross over the Kilmarnock Water and on to the junction with Titchfield Street. Many of the buildings on King Street, including the Town House and King Street Church, were demolished during redevelopments in the 1970s and were replaced by flat-roofed shops.

=== Portland Street ===
Portland Street opened about 1805, not long after the opening of King Street. In 1924 a bus service started operating in Kilmarnock, the tram service which had served the town closed in 1926, as it was no longer needed. In 1924 the bus station was established in Portland Street, this continued to serve the town until it was closed and later demolished in the 1970s. A market operated from within the old bus station, and after the demolition continued to operate from the site there. A new bus station was built during the redevelopment and this is where it remains. Portland Street has been completely demolished and rebuilt with new modern buildings which have become shops, a bingo hall and a super pub.

== See also ==
- Kilmarnock
- King Street, Kilmarnock
