= Shaw baronets of Greenock (1687) =

Escutcheon of the Shaw baronets of Greenock

The Shaw or Schaw baronetcy, of Greenock in the County of Renfrew, was created in the Baronetage of Nova Scotia on 28 June 1687 for John Shaw, Member for Renfrewshire. The third Baronet sat as Member of Parliament for Renfrewshire and Clackmannanshire.

The title became extinct on the 3rd Baronet's death in 1752. His sister Margaret married Sir John Houston, 3rd Baronet, and their daughter Helena married Sir Michael Stewart, 3rd Baronet. The Shaw estates went to Sir John Stewart, 4th Baronet, who adopted the additional surname Shaw. The succession continued as the Shaw Stewart baronets of Greenock and Blackhall.

== Shaw baronets, of Greenock (1687) ==
- Sir John Shaw, 1st Baronet (died 1693)
- Sir John Shaw, 2nd Baronet (died 1702)
- Sir John Shaw, 3rd Baronet (c. 1679–1752)
