= Philpot Lane =

Street in the City of London, England

Coordinates: 51°30′39.97″N 0°5′2.62″W

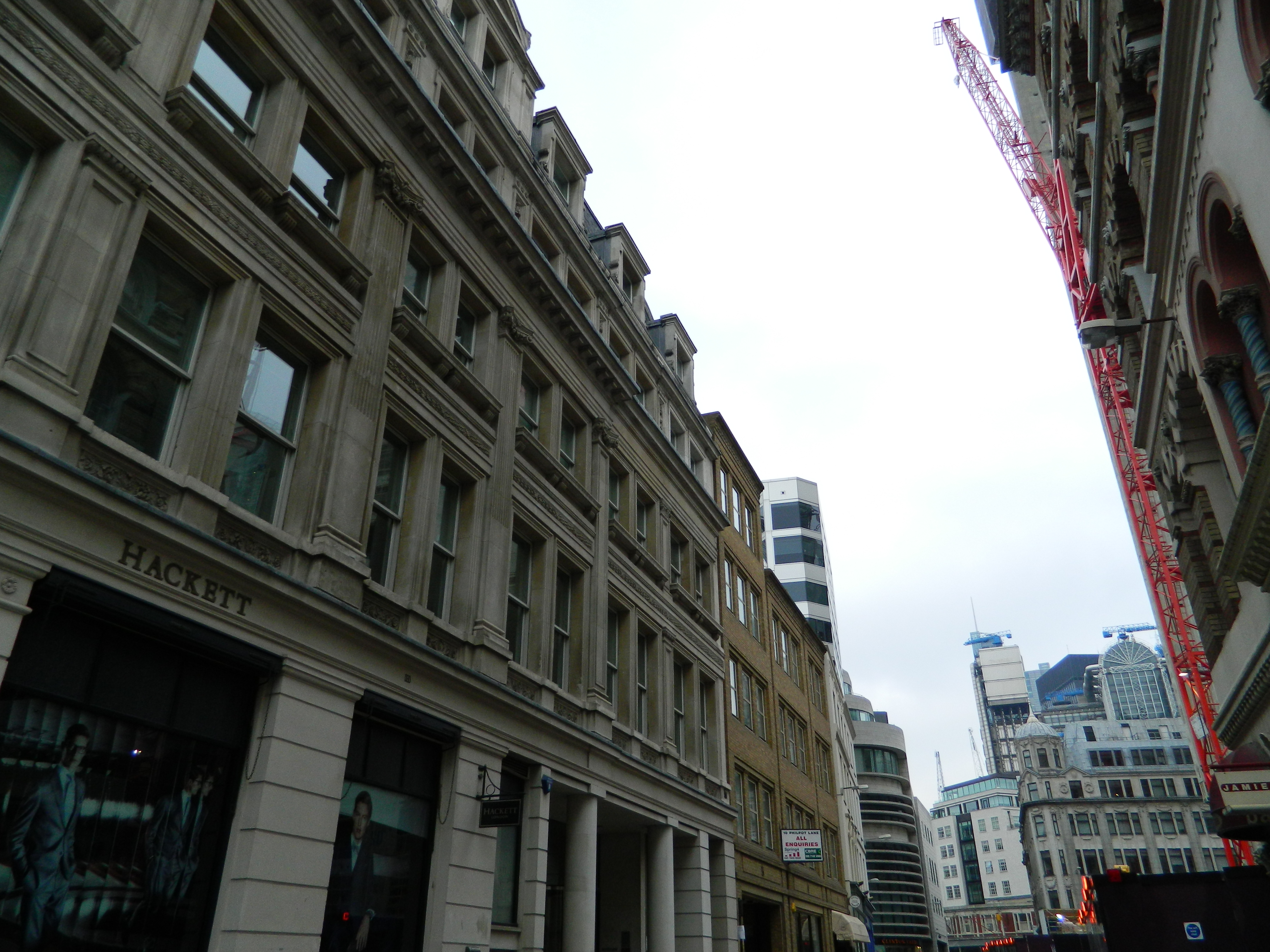
Philpot Lane

Philpot Lane is a short street in London, United Kingdom, running from Eastcheap in the south to Fenchurch Street in the north. It is named after Sir John Philpot, Lord Mayor of London from 1378 to 1379.

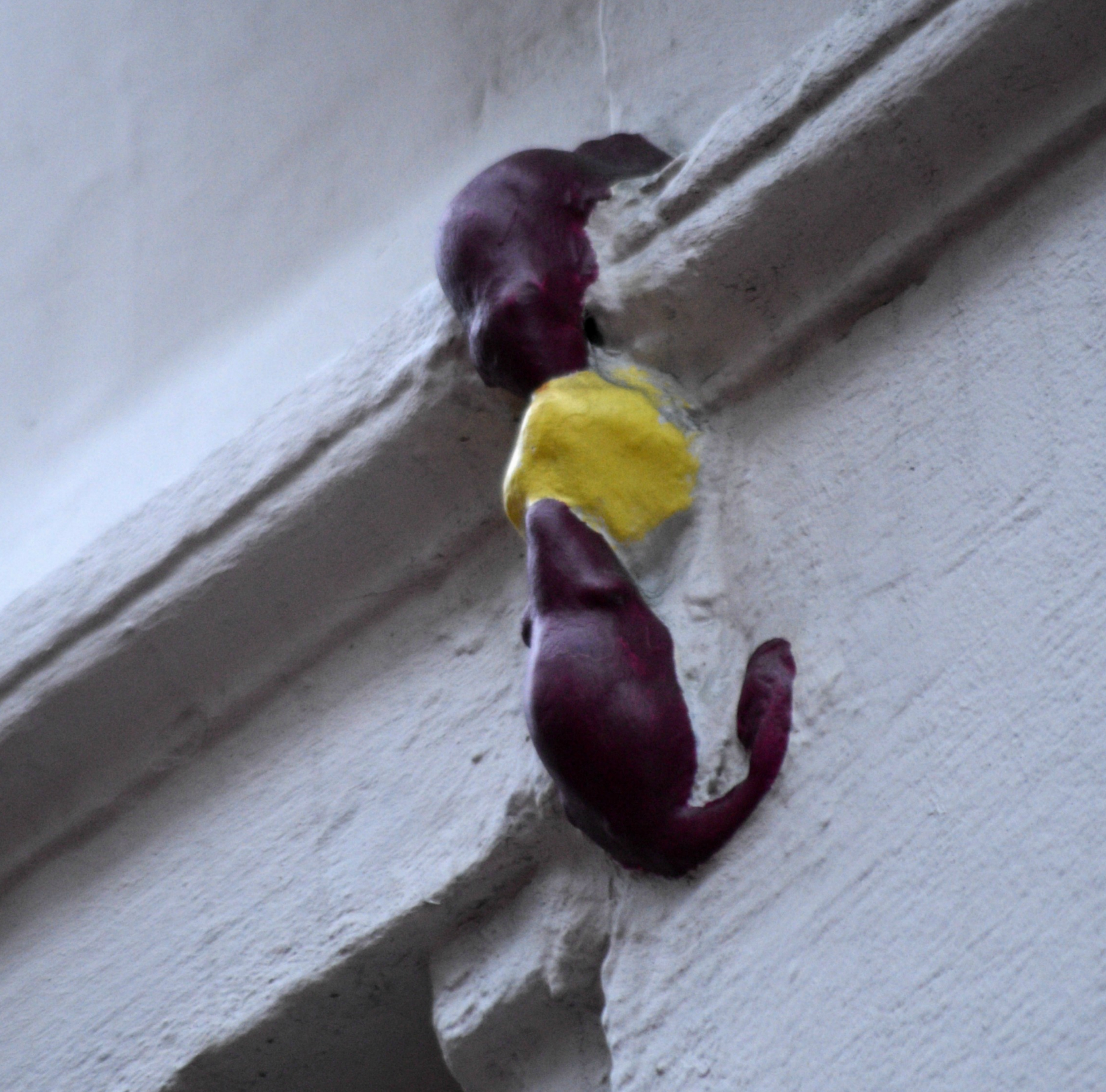
The Two Mice Eating Cheese

It is the site of London's smallest public statue, The Two Mice Eating Cheese, on a building near the junction with Eastcheap. The sculpture supposedly commemorates the death of two workmen, who are said to have fallen from scaffolding either during the construction of the building in 1862, or during the construction of the nearby Monument to the Great Fire of London in the 1670s. Some versions of the story have both of them dying, others say that one pushed the other from the roof. The story goes that the workmen were arguing over the theft of a sandwich, which was later revealed to have been taken by mice.

== Brabant Court ==
Brabant Court is located on the western side of Philpot Lane. It contains one of the few remaining Georgian residencies left in the City of London, at No. 4. Built in 1710, it was restored in 2013 and furnished with 18th-century furniture.
