= Sir James Shaw, 1st Baronet =

Lord Mayor of London

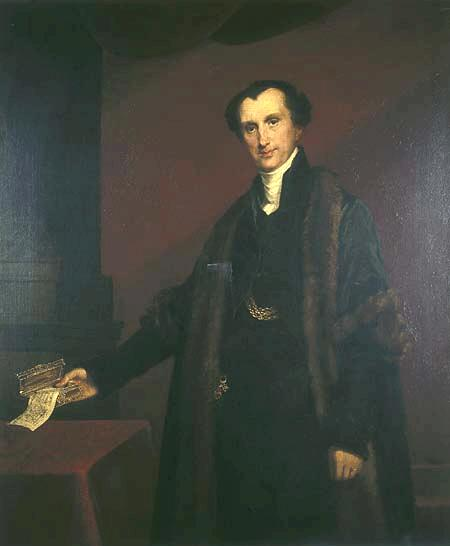
1834 portrait of Shaw by Mary Martha Pearson

Sir James Shaw, 1st Baronet (26 August 1764 – 22 October 1843), became Lord Mayor of London in 1805. From humble beginnings in a farming family in Ayrshire, he became a successful merchant and politician; he was a relation of Robert Burns and used his wealth to support Burns's orphaned children. As Lord Mayor of London, he led the funeral procession of Lord Nelson in 1806, having established his right to do so and was created baronet twice, in 1809 and 1813. While later Chamberlain of London, he almost lost his own fortune due to injudicious investments, and died, exonerated, in 1843.

== Early life and career ==
Shaw was born on 26 August 1764, in Riccarton, Kilmarnock, Scotland, the son of a "respectable farmer", John Shaw, whose family had farmed the area of Mosshead for over 300 years, and Hellen Sellars. On the death of his father, the family moved to Kilmarnock, and Shaw studied at the local grammar school.

At the age of 17, he followed his elder brother to America to seek work, returning after three years to take up a position in the same company's London offices and becoming a junior partner in the firm. He became a wealthy merchant and financially assisted the children of Robert Burns after Burns's death in 1796. He was elected alderman for Portsoken in 1798 and became Sheriff of London and Middlesex in 1803.

== Lord Mayor of London ==
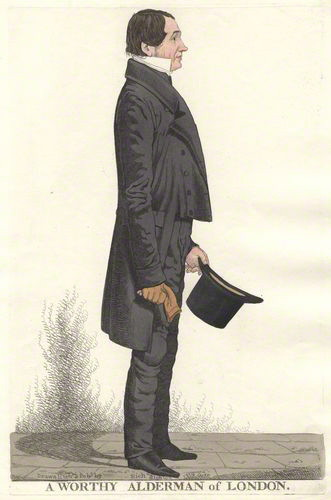
"A Worthy Alderman of London", caricature of Shaw by Richard Dighton (October 1819)

Shaw had developed a reputation as a "gentleman and a citizen" and was sponsored for the office of Lord Mayor of London by the Scriveners' Company, and became only the second member of that guild to achieve that honour.

Having taken office in 1805, Shaw determined to re-establish the tradition whereby the Lord Mayor took precedence in public processions within the City of London over all except the reigning monarch, and took the opportunity of the funeral of Lord Nelson in 1806 to do so. According to one account, Shaw discussed the matter with the Prime Minister, Lord Liverpool, who was aware that the Prince Regent would be attending the funeral, but did not seem willing to take action. Shaw then offered to visit the King himself at Windsor Castle to resolve the matter, and Liverpool said that he would see what could be done. By the following day, the Royal Warrant of Precedence had been granted, and Shaw duly led the procession.

== Baronetcy and later career ==
Shaw was created Baronet, of Kilmarnock, in the County of Ayr by George III in 1809, and re-created in 1813 by a second patent to include a future interest for his nephew. As such, he was appointed a Member of Parliament for London until 1818, but thereafter sat as an alderman until he resigned in May 1843. In 1831 he was also appointed Chamberlain of London, and was almost ruined as he inadvertently invested £40,000, then a huge sum, of city funds in fake Exchequer bills. On discovering his error, he began to liquidate all his property to repay the sum, but was cleared by a commission of enquiry. Shaw resigned all his positions in 1843 due to long-term illness and died some six months later on 22 October. Shaw was unmarried, and normally his baronetcy would have become extinct on his death, but because of the second patent, the title passed to his nephew, John Shaw.

Shaw was also President of St Bartholomew's Hospital from 1806 to 1831 and President of the Honourable Artillery Company from 1829 to 1843.

== Legacy ==
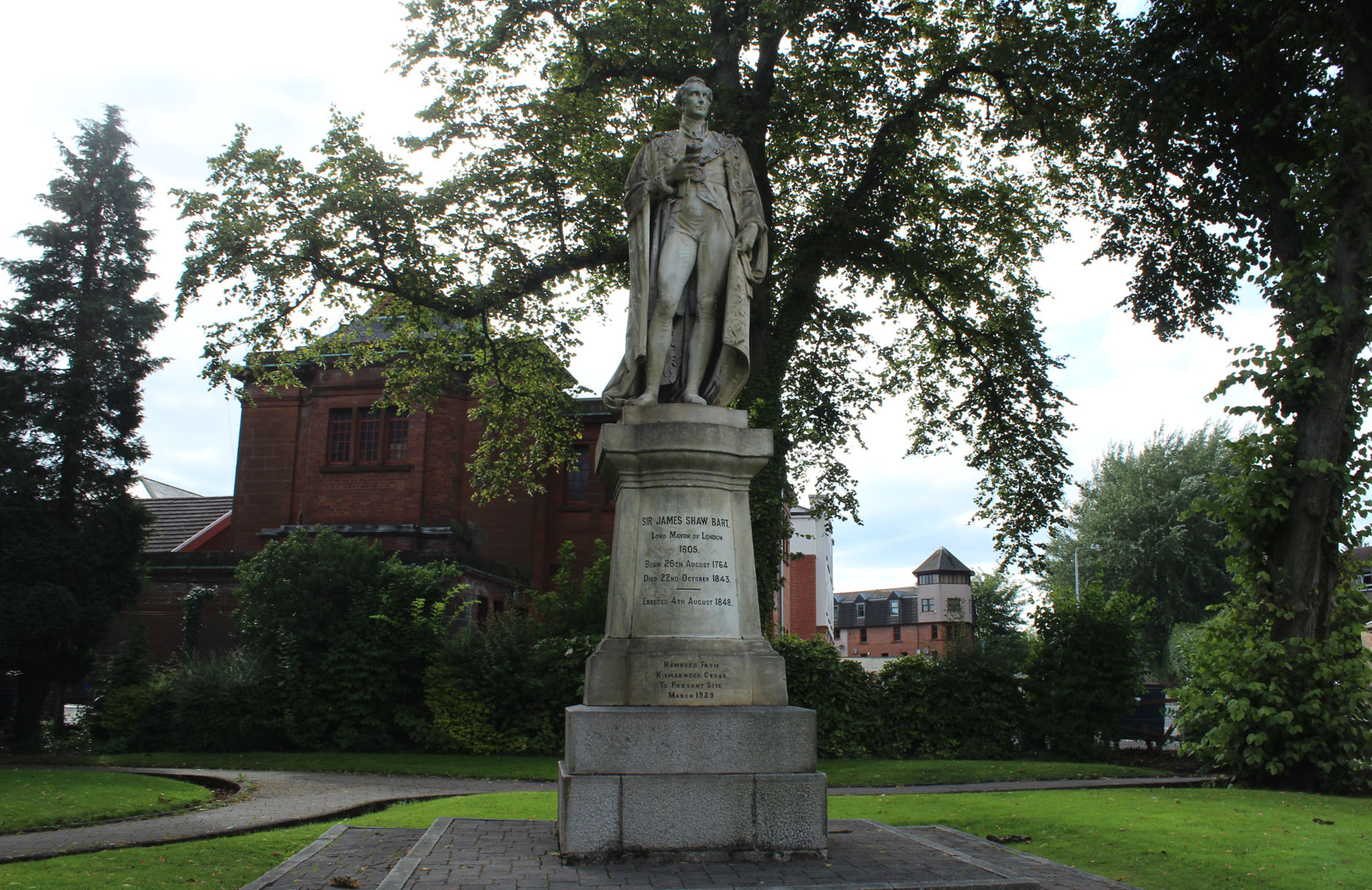
Statue of Shaw in Kilmarnock town centre

Shaw is commemorated in Kilmarnock town centre by a statue of Carrara marble, about 17 feet tall, on a base of Aberdeen granite, executed by sculptor James Fillans (1808–52). The cost was defrayed by public subscription, which raised almost £1000. It was unveiled on 4 August 1848 and was originally located at the Kilmarnock Cross. On 28 March 1929 the statue was moved to the area of The Dick Institute just off the London Road because of the increase in traffic around the centre of the town.

It was described as

... a noble work of art, worthy of the creative genius of the sculptor, Mr. Fillans, and no less worthy of the venerable baronet whom it commemorates, and of whom, we believe, it is a faithful likeness. In symmetry of form it is truly admirable. The mild, benevolent features of Sir James are finely developed; and, as a whole, it is replete with that seeming animation and intellectual expression which mark the superior powers of the sculptor, and give to the object itself a high and permanent interest.

His portrait (pictured above) is also shown in the Guildhall, London.

== See also ==
- Shaw Baronets

Parliament of the United Kingdom
Preceded by Sir Charles Price, Bt; Harvey Christian Combe; Sir John Anderson, Bt; Sir William Curtis, Bt	Member of Parliament for the City of London; 1806 – 1818; With: Sir Charles Price, Bt 1806–1812; Harvey Christian Combe 1806–1817; Sir William Curtis, Bt 1806–1818; John Atkins 1812–1818; Sir Matthew Wood, Bt 1817–1818	Succeeded by Sir Matthew Wood, Bt; Thomas Wilson; Robert Waithman; John Thomas Thorp
Civic offices
Preceded by Peter Perchard	Lord Mayor of London; 1805–1806	Succeeded by William Leighton
Baronetage of the United Kingdom
New creation	Baronet (of Kilmarnock); 1809 creation 1809–1843	Extinct
New creation	Baronet (of Kilmarnock); 1813 creation 1813–1843	Succeeded by John Shaw
Preceded by Roberts baronets	Shaw baronets of Kilmarnock; 21 September 1809	Succeeded by Blennerhassett baronets
