= Fowler baronets of Gastard House (1885) =

Escutcheon of the Fowler baronets of Gastard House

The Fowler baronetcy of Gastard House in the Parish of Corsham in the County of Wiltshire and of Bruce Grove in the Parish of Tottenham in the County of Middlesex was created in the Baronetage of the United Kingdom on 1 August 1885 for Robert Nicholas Fowler, an academic and Member of Parliament for Penryn and Falmouth from 1868 to 1874 and for London from 1880 to 1891.

The title became extinct on the death in action of the 2nd Baronet in 1902.

== Fowler baronets, of Gastard House (1885) ==
- Robert Nicholas Fowler, 1st Baronet (1828–1891)
- Thomas Fowler, 2nd Baronet (1868–1902), a banker and militia officer, died unmarried, killed in the Moolman's Spruit action of the Second Anglo-Boer War.

== Extended family ==
The 2nd Baronet was survived by six of his nine sisters, including Jean Elizabeth and Rachel Elfreda Fowler.

== Notes ==
Baronetage of the United Kingdom
Preceded by Harland baronets	Fowler baronets of Gastard House; 1 August 1885	Succeeded by Thornhill baronets
