= Twells =

Twells is a surname, and may refer to:

- Edward Twells (1823–1898), Bishop of Bloemfontein
- Henry Twells (1823–1900), English cleric, hymn writer and poet
- John Twells (1776–1866), English banker
- Leonard Twells (c.1684–1742), English cleric and theological writer
- Philip Twells (1808–1880), British politician.
