= 1869 City of London by-election =

By-election held in England

The 1869 City of London by-election was held on 22 February 1869. The by-election was held due to the death of the incumbent Conservative MP Charles Bell. It was won by the unopposed Liberal candidate Baron Lionel Nathan de Rothschild who had been an MP for the constituency since 1847 until losing in the 1868 general election. The Liberals did not hold this gain in the 1874 general election.

The by-election was held by a gathering of the electorate at the London Guildhall. Rothschild was nominated by the banker and former Liberal MP Martin Tucker Smith, and as there were no other nominations at the meeting he was declared elected without a vote.
