= John Hubbard, 1st Baron Addington =

British financier & politician (1805–1889)

The Right Honourable The Lord Addington JP DL PC
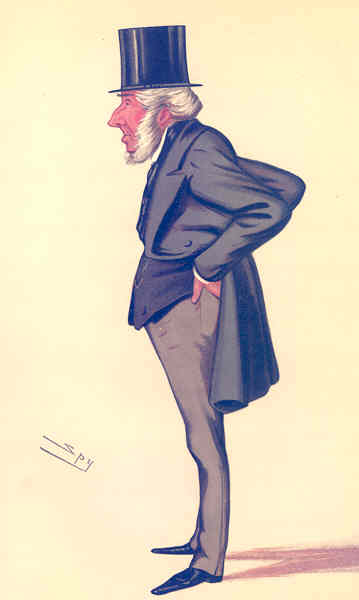
- Caricature by "Spy" published in Vanity Fair in 1884.

Member of the House of Lords Lord Temporal
- In office 22 July 1887 – 28 August 1889; Hereditary peerage
- Preceded by: Peerage created
- Succeeded by: The 2nd Baron Addington

Member of Parliament for City of London
- In office 17 February 1874 – 22 July 1887
- Preceded by: Lionel de Rothschild
- Succeeded by: Thomas Charles Baring

Member of Parliament for Buckingham
- In office 18 May 1859 – 7 December 1868
- Preceded by: John Hall
- Succeeded by: Sir Harry Verney

Personal details
- Born: 21 March 1805
- Died: 28 August 1889 (aged 84)
- Party: Conservative
- Spouse: Maria Margaret Napier (m. 1837)
- Children: 9, including Egerton and Evelyn

John Gellibrand Hubbard, 1st Baron Addington PC (21 March 1805 – 28 August 1889), was a City of London financier and a Conservative Party politician.

== Background and early life ==
He was born at Stratford Grove, Essex, the son of John Hubbard and his wife Marianne Morgan, daughter of John Morgan of Bramfield Place. John Hubbard, who died in 1847, was a merchant in the City of London, head of the firm J. Hubbard & Co., Russian merchants. It was one of a small group of family companies controlling British textile trade with Russia, and opened an office in Saint Petersburg in 1816. William Hubbard, John Hubbard's father, had been a merchant in Arkhangelsk, before settling in St Petersburg.

John Gellibrand Hubbard became a partner in the family company in 1821.

== Finance ==
Hubbard worked as a financier in London, with his brother William Egerton Hubbard more involved in the company as a merchant for a long period in St Petersburg. He became a director of the Guardian Fire and Life Assurance Co.

In 1838 Hubbard joined the Bank of England as a director. He later rose to become successively Deputy Governor, from 1851 to 1853, and then Governor from 1853 to 1855.

Hubbard was Chairman of the Public Works Loan Commission from 1853. In 1855 he was involved in an official inquiry into decimalisation of the British currency, with Lord Monteagle and Lord Overstone. In 1857 he gave evidence to a parliamentary select committee on the Bank Acts. On that occasion, along with William Newmarch, George Warde Norman, Overstone and Thomas Matthias Weguelin, he was subjected to close questioning by James Wilson.

At the time of the panic of 1866, Hubbard was with Norman and Thomson Hankey in resisting the idea that the Bank of England should act as lender of last resort; the Bank's governor Henry Lancelot Holland wished to intervene, but the Bank's role in central banking was at the period ill-defined, and its Board lacked consensus in that area. He commented extensively on the gold coinage question in 1869. During the bimetallism debate of the late 1880s, Mark Collet as Governor of the Bank of England did not comment; but Hubbard, Henry Wollaston Blake and Alfred de Rothschild, directors of the Bank, commented in their personal capacity favourably on bimetallism.

== Political life ==
Hubbard was elected as a Member of Parliament (MP) for Buckingham at the 1859 general election. He was re-elected in 1865 but when Buckingham's representation was reduced to one MP at the 1868 general election he was defeated. He returned to the House of Commons at the 1874 general election when he was elected as one of the four MPs for the City of London, and held the seat until he was created 1st Baron Addington, of Addington, Buckinghamshire, on 22 July 1887.

Hubbard was a JP and Deputy Lieutenant for Buckinghamshire and the City of London. He was invested as a Privy Counsellor in 1874.

The first parliamentary session of 1860 saw Hubbard with Lord Robert Cecil introduce a bill on reform of church rates. It proposed a range of exemptions, but ran out of time. The Liberation Society, supported in the House of Commons by Sir John Salusbury-Trelawny, wished to see them abolished, but its backing was reaching a peak. Trelawny and other Liberals were looking for a compromise. In terms of practical politics, the issue was a reform that would pass both in the Commons and the House of Lords. Hubbard's bill was brought back on several occasions, and Charles Newdigate Newdegate offered a reform by commutation of church rates. It took eight years for an acceptable reform to emerge. A bill of W. E. Gladstone, which had something in common with Hubbard's, was heavily amended in the Lords, and then passed into law as the Compulsory Church Rate Abolition Act in 1868.

In 1882 Hubbard asked Gladstone as Prime Minister to intervene in the case of the Rev. Sidney Faithorn Green, who was serving time in prison in a case involving offences against the Public Worship Regulation Act 1874.

== Residences and death ==
Hubbard had Addington Manor, at Addington, Buckinghamshire, built to a design by Philip Charles Hardwick in 1856–7. Its site was near the earlier Addington House, which had belonged to John Poulett son of Vere Poulett, but had fallen into disrepair. Hubbard bought the estate there in 1854. The landscape architect William Andrews Nesfield was brought into a planning process from about 1855. The new building was in a French style with a large conservatory. Hubbard demolished part of the old house in 1857. He retained his London house, 24 Prince's Gate, South Kensington opposite Hyde Park.

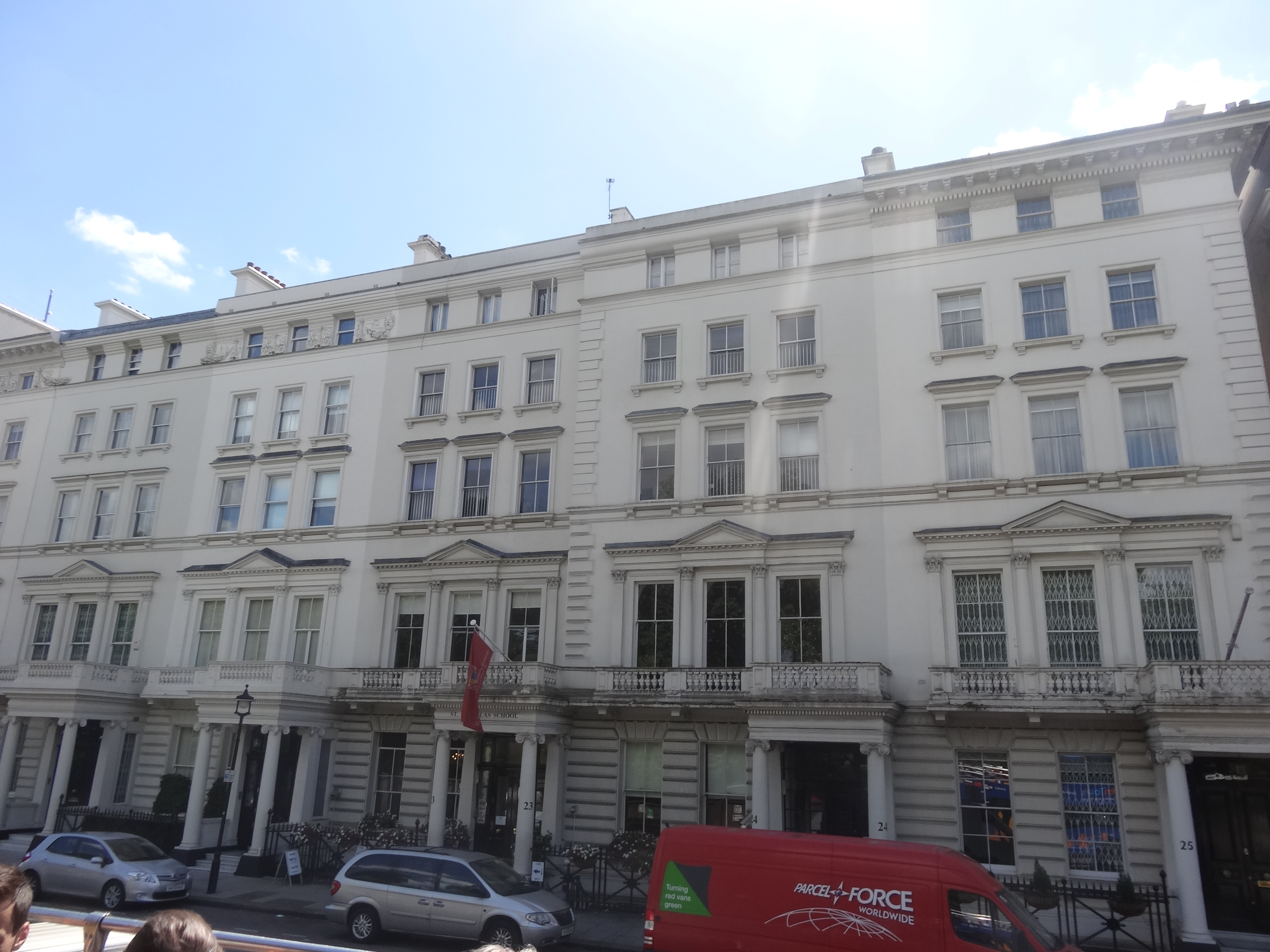
London terrace showing 24 Prince's Gate, 2017 photograph

The parish priest at Addington and Shenley in 1865 was the Rev. Robert William Scurr, who died in 1866. As patron of the Addington church, Hubbard brought in the Rev. David Greig (1826–1903), who had been at Holy Trinity, Brompton, as incumbent in 1869; Greig had early background of urban mission work in Dundee.

Hubbard was a Fellow of the Royal Geographical Society. He died at Addington Manor on 28 August 1889, at the age of 84, and was buried in the parish churchyard. The probate value of his estate was £111,985 6s. 1d.

Addington Manor was subsequently rebuilt in neo-classical style, in 1928–9, to a design by Michael Waterhouse. Under the later ownership of Kenneth James William Mackay, 3rd Earl of Inchcape, an equestrian centre was set up there.

== Interests ==
Hubbard supported Nathaniel Woodard's network of what became known as Woodard Schools. He was one of the signatories of the 1856 deed setting up St Nicholas College in Shoreham-by-Sea, a stage in the early evolution of Shoreham College. Other backers involved at this point were Alexander Beresford Hope, Lord Robert Cecil, Sir John Patteson and Henry Tritton. Some of Hubbard's sons were educated at St Peter's College, Radley, which under the leadership of Robert Corbet Singleton and William Sewell ran at a deficit. Hubbard played a major role in rescuing the school's finances when they collapsed around 1860, with Sewell being replaced.

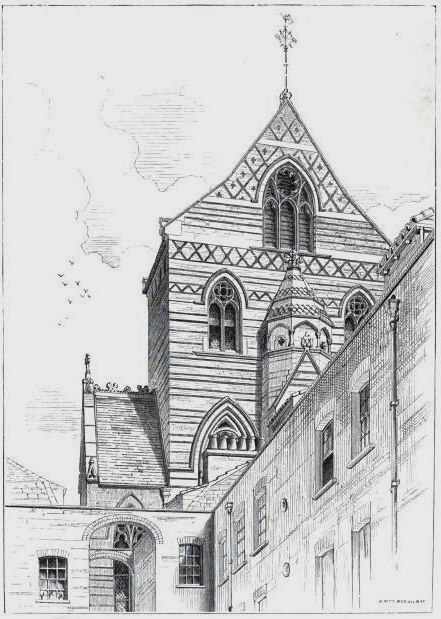
St Alban the Martyr, Holborn, architect's drawing 1858

In 1863 Hubbard built and endowed St Alban's Church, Holborn. The land was given by William Henry Leigh, 2nd Baron Leigh, and the architect was William Butterfield. On the advice of William John Butler, Hubbard as patron appointed Alexander Mackonochie as the priest: he was a recent associate of Charles Lowder at St George in the East in mission work, where there had been disruption and scandal. Later he found himself opposed to Mackonochie's use of ceremony, as ritualism. He wrote to the Bishop of London on the subject in 1868. Mackonochie left St Alban's Church in 1882; his curate Arthur Stanton who had been there from the start, remained, on a nominal salary, in the same post until his death in 1913. Stanton had been a university friend of Henry Thornhill Morgan, son of David Thomas Morgan.

== Economic works ==
Hubbard was a supporter of the Corn Laws of early 19th-century Britain. He advocated in 1842 for a moderate, fixed duty on corn imports. He published in the 1840s:

- Vindication of a Fixed Duty on Corn: To which are Added Remarks Suggested by the Speech of R.A. Christopher, Esq. M.P. at Lincoln (1842). The subtitle refers to Robert Nisbet-Hamilton, at the time of publication known as Robert Christopher.
- The Currency and the Country (1843). This work was quoted in Das Kapital, Volume III.
- A Letter to the Right Honourable Sir Charles Wood, Bart., M.P., Chancellor of the Exchequer, on the Monetary Pressure and Commercial Distress of 1847 (1848), on the panic of 1847.

Convinced capital and income should be treated differently, Hubbard lobbied in parliament for the fiscal treatment of income tax on earned income only. The topic was under active discussion for a decade from 1852, with contributions also from William Farr, J. R. McCulloch and William Lucas Sargant.

- How Should an Income Tax be Levied?: Considered in a Letter to the Right Honourable Benjamin Disraeli, M.P., Chancellor of the Exchequer (1852)
- Reform or Reject the Income-tax: Objections to a Reform of the Income-tax Considered in Two Letters to the Editor of the Times : with Additional Notes (1853)
- Gladstone on the Income Tax: Discussion on the Income Tax, in the House of Commons on 25th April, 1884 : with Preface and Historical Sketch, Including a Proposed Bill (1885)

== Religious positions ==
Hubbard was a High Church Tory, and his position was defined by Urban T. Holmes III as "a "Prayer Book Catholic", with strong social concerns." He wrote pamphlets on a range of topics with a religious aspect. At the time of the Gorham Case, he chaired a meeting about it on 23 July 1850. His remarks from the chair spoke for opponents of the Privy Council's decision.

- The Church and Church Rates. A Letter to the Electors of the Borough of Buckingham (1861)
- The Attendance of Non-Communicants at the Administration of the Holy Communion. Reprinted from a Letter to the Editor of "The Church Review" (1864)
- The Conscience Clause of the Education Department. Illustrated from the Evidence Taken by the Select Committee on Education, Etc.
- The Conscience Clause in 1866 (1866), with George Trevor.
- The National Church and the National Society for Promoting the Education of the Poor in the Principles of the Established Church: A Speech Delivered at Birmingham on October 31, 1876 (1877)
- Speech of the Right Hon. J.G. Hubbard, M.P.: On Mr. Osborne Morgan's Resolution Respecting the Burials Question (1878)
- A Census of Religions; Denominational Worship; The National Church: Three Essays (1882)

== Family ==
Hubbard married Maria Margaret Napier, daughter of Captain William John Napier, 9th Lord Napier of Merchistoun, and Eliza Cochrane-Johnstone, on 19 May 1837. They had five sons and four daughters:

- Alice Eliza Hubbard (1841–1931)
- Egerton Hubbard, 2nd Baron Addington (1842–1915)
- Francis Egerton Hubbard RN (1844–1871)
- Lucy Marian Hubbard (1845–1893)
- Cecil John Hubbard (1846–1926)
- Arthur Gellibrand Hubbard (1848–1896). He worked in colonial administration in southern Africa, and married in 1881 Amy d'Esterre Huntley (Amelia d'Esterre Huntly), daughter of Charles Hugh Huntley.
- Rose Ellen Hubbard (1851–1933)
- Evelyn Hubbard (1852–1934)
- Clemency Hubbard (1856–1940)

== Business legacy ==
According to Daunton, "The Hubbards provide an object lesson on how to mishandle inheritance and succession in a family firm [...]". Organisationally the partnerships J. Hubbard & Co. of London and W. E. Hubbard & Co. of St Petersburg were merged, and in 1897 Anglo-Russian Cotton Factories Ltd. was formed. But the business was in financial trouble, and was bailed out by Stuart Rendel.

== Arms ==
Coat of arms of John Hubbard, 1st Baron Addington
| Crest In front of a fasces fessewise Proper an eagle's head as in the arms. Escutcheon Vert a chevron engrailed plain cotised Argent between three eagles' heads erased of the second each gorged with a collar fleurettée Gules Supporters On either side an eagle Argent wings addorsed gorged with a collar fleurettée Gules and pendent therefrom an escutcheon Ermine charged with a rose Gules Motto Alta Petens (Latin for: Seeking Higher Things) |

Parliament of the United Kingdom
| Preceded by Sir Harry Verney; John Hall | Member of Parliament for Buckingham; 1859–1868; With: Sir Harry Verney | Succeeded by Sir Harry Verney |
| Preceded by William Lawrence; Baron Lionel de Rothschild; Robert Wigram Crawford; George Goschen | Member of Parliament for City of London; 1874–1887; With: George Goschen to 1880; Philip Twells to 1880; William Cotton to 1885; William Lawrence 1880–85; Sir Robert Fowler, Bt 1880–91 | Succeeded by Sir Robert Nicholas Fowler; Thomas Charles Baring |
Government offices
| Preceded by Thomson Hankey | Governor of the Bank of England; 1853–1855 | Succeeded by Thomas Matthias Weguelin |
Peerage of the United Kingdom
| New creation | Baron Addington; 1887–1889 | Succeeded by Egerton Hubbard |
