= Dick Wood (politician) =

Australian politician (1906–1984)

Dick Wood OBE

Member of the Queensland Legislative Assembly for Logan
- In office 28 May 1966 – 17 May 1969
- Preceded by: Leslie Harrison
- Succeeded by: Ted Baldwin

Personal details
- Born: Ernest Gaden Western Wood; 22 November 1906 Toowoomba, Queensland, Australia
- Died: 5 July 1984 (aged 77) Wellington Point, Queensland, Australia
- Resting place: Cleveland Cemetery
- Party: Country Party
- Spouse: Mary Tudor Hill (m.2001)
- Relations: Western Wood (grandfather), Western Wood (great-grandfather)
- Occupation: Farmer

Ernest Gaden Western "Dick" Wood (22 November 1906 – 5 July 1984) was a member of the Queensland Legislative Assembly.

== Biography ==
Wood was born in Toowoomba, Queensland, the son of George Orme Western Wood and his wife Helen Portia Rosalind (née Davidson). He was educated at the Rangeville State School and Toowoomba Grammar School and after finishing his education worked in a variety of jobs in Queensland and the Northern Territory. From 1952 he was a small crops farmer at Wellington Point for the next 24 years.

On 22 September 1938 he married Mary Tudor Hill and together had two son and two daughters. Wood died in July 1984 and was buried in the Cleveland Cemetery.

== Public career ==
Wood, representing the Country Party, won the seat of Logan at the 1966 Queensland state election, defeating his main opponent, William Ware of the Labor Party. He represented the electorate for three years before his defeat in 1969.

He was a Councilor on the Redland Shire Council from 1958 and chairman of the shire for seven consecutive terms. His grandfather, Western Wood was a member of the Queensland Legislative Council in the 1860s and his great-grandfather, also named Western Wood was a member of the House of Commons of the United Kingdom.

Parliament of Queensland
Preceded by Leslie Harrison	Member for Logan; 1966–1969	Succeeded by Ted Baldwin
