= Lionel de Rothschild =

British Jewish banker and politician (1808–1879)

Baron Lionel de Rothschild
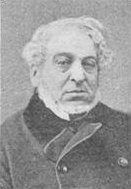

Member of Parliament for the City of London
- In office 1847–1868
- Preceded by: George Lyall Sr.
- Succeeded by: Charles Bell
- In office 1869–1874
- Preceded by: Charles Bell
- Succeeded by: Philip Twells

Personal details
- Born: Lionel Nathan Rothschild; 22 November 1808 London, England
- Died: 3 June 1879 (aged 70) London, England
- Resting place: Willesden Jewish Cemetery, Brent, London
- Party: Liberal
- Spouse: Charlotte von Rothschild (m. 1836)
- Children: 5, including Evelina, Nathan, Alfred, and Leopold
- Parent: Nathan Mayer Rothschild (father)

Baron Lionel Nathan de Rothschild (22 November 1808 – 3 June 1879) was a British Jewish banker, politician and philanthropist who was a member of the prominent Rothschild banking family of England. He became the first practising Jew to sit as a Member of Parliament in the House of Commons of the United Kingdom. (Note: There had been Members of Parliament of Jewish origin since Sampson Gideon in 1770, but all were professed Christians when sitting.)

He co-founded the British Relief Association, the largest private provider of relief during the Great Irish and Highland Potato famines raising over £500,000.

== Life and career ==
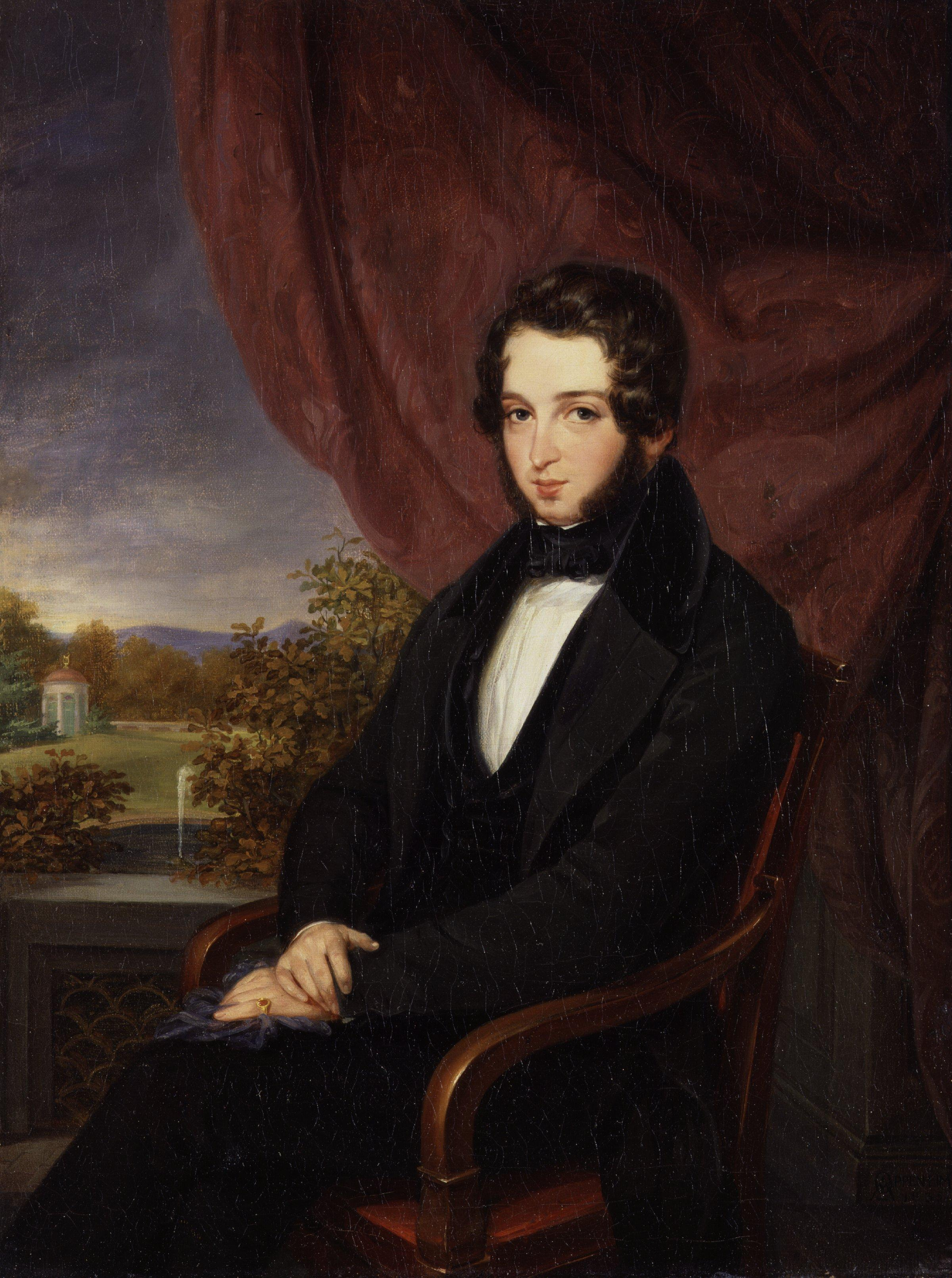
Portrait of Rothschild by Moritz Daniel Oppenheim, 1835

The eldest son of Nathan Mayer Rothschild and his wife, Hannah Barent-Cohen, he was a member of the wealthy Rothschild family. Both of his parents were Jewish. He was born in London, where his father had founded the English branch of the Europe-wide family.

In his earlier years, he studied at the University of Göttingen before embarking on an apprenticeship in the family business at London, Paris and Frankfurt. He was admitted to the family partnership in 1836 at a family gathering in Frankfurt.

Like his father, he was a Freiherr (baron) of the Austrian Empire, but unlike his father, he used the title in British society. By royal licence of Queen Victoria on 16 June 1838, he was allowed (along with other male-line descendants of his late father) to use the Austrian title of baron in the United Kingdom.

Prime Minister Gladstone proposed to Queen Victoria that Lionel be made a British peer. She demurred, saying that titling a Jew would raise antagonism and furthermore it would be unseemly to reward a man whose vast wealth was based on what she called "a species of gambling" rather than legitimate trade. However, the Queen did raise Lionel's son Nathan to the peerage in 1885, and he became the first Jewish member of the House of Lords.

== Banking and philanthropy ==
Rothschild was responsible for raising large sums for the government, especially in the Crimean War, and for philanthropic relief of the victims of the Great Irish Famine. In 1861, in protest at the suppression of the Polish uprisings, he (initially) refused to contract a loan to Russia. His most famous undertaking was financing the government's purchase of the Suez Canal shares from Egypt for £4 million.

=== Irish and Highland famine relief ===
On 1 January 1847, he founded the British Relief Association, alongside Stephen Spring Rice, John Abel Smith and other notable aristocrats. The Association went on to raise £500,000, and was the largest private provider of relief during the Irish Famine and Highland Potato Famine.

A Dublin newspaper, commenting in 1850, pointed out that Baron Lionel de Rothschild and his family had,

...contributed during the Irish famine of 1847 ... a sum far beyond the joint contributions of the Devonshires, and Herefords, Lansdownes, Fitzwilliams and Herberts, who annually drew so many times that amount from their Irish estates.

== Parliament ==
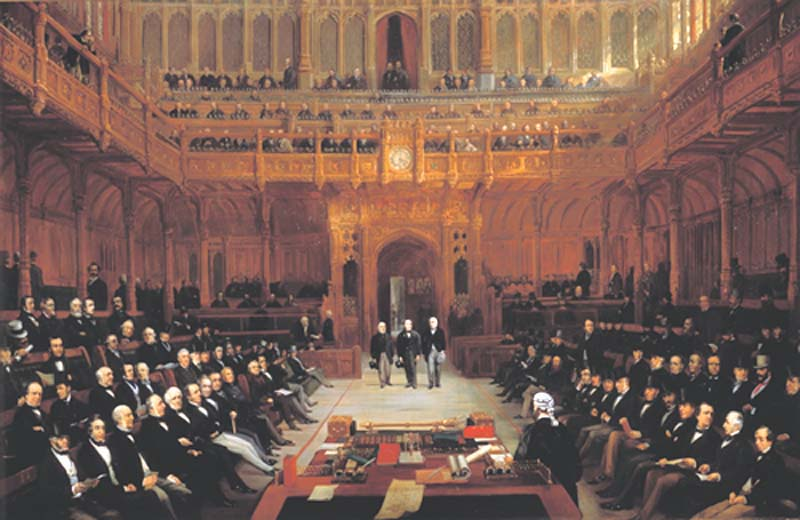
Lionel Nathan de Rothschild introduced in the House of Commons on 26 July 1858 by Lord John Russell and Mr John Abel Smith, by Henry Barraud, 1872

In 1847, Lionel de Rothschild was first elected to the British House of Commons as one of four Members of Parliament for the City of London constituency. Because Jews were at that point still barred from sitting in the chamber due to the Christian oath required to be sworn in, Prime Minister Lord John Russell introduced a Jewish Disabilities Bill to remove the problem with the oath. In 1848, the bill was approved by the House of Commons but was twice rejected by the House of Lords. After being rejected again by the Upper House in 1849, Rothschild resigned his seat and stood again winning in a by-election to strengthen his claim.

In 1850, he entered the House of Commons to take his seat but refused to swear on a Christian Bible asking to use only the Hebrew Bible. This was permitted but when omitting the words "upon the true faith of a Christian" from the oath he was required to leave.

In 1851, a new Jewish Disabilities Bill was defeated in the House of Lords. In the 1852 general election, Rothschild was again elected but the next year the bill was again defeated in the upper house.

Finally, in the Jews Relief Act 1858, the House of Lords agreed to a proposal to allow each house to decide its own oath. On 26 July 1858, Rothschild took the oath with covered head, substituting "so help me, Jehovah" for the ordinary form of oath, and thereupon took his seat as the first Jewish member of Parliament. He was re-elected in general elections in 1859 and 1865, but defeated in 1868; he was returned unopposed in a by-election in 1869 but defeated a second time in the general election in 1874.

== Personal life and family ==
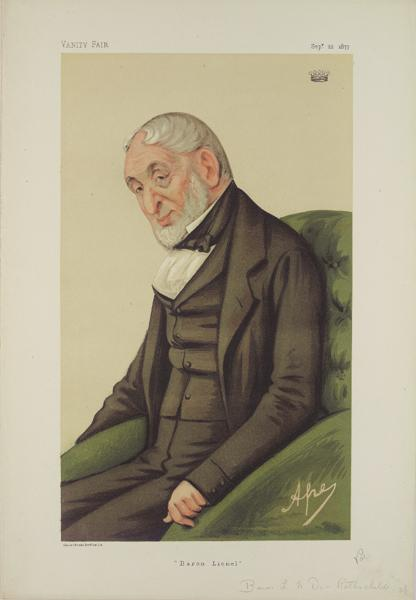
Caricature in Vanity Fair, 1877

A patron of thoroughbred horse racing, under the assumed name of "Mr Acton", Rothschild's colt Sir Bevys won the 1879 Epsom Derby.

In 1836, Lionel de Rothschild married his first cousin Baroness Charlotte von Rothschild (1819–1884), daughter of Baron Carl Mayer von Rothschild of the Rothschild banking family of Naples.

They had the following children:

1. Leonora (1837–1911)
2. Evelina (1839–1866)
3. Nathan Mayer (1840–1915)
4. Alfred Charles (1842–1918)
5. Leopold (1845–1917)

== Illness and death ==
Lionel de Rothschild suffered from gout for more than 20 years. He had a seizure on 3 June 1879 and died the next morning in his city home at 148 Piccadilly in London, aged 70. His body was interred at the Willesden Jewish Cemetery in the North London suburb of Willesden. The grave is marked by a "handsome granite memorial", and surrounded by a stone enclosure designed by the architect George Devey.

== See also ==
- History of the Jews in England
- Electoral firsts in the United Kingdom

== Sources ==
- Loades, David, ed. (2003). Reader's guide to British history (2nd ed.). New York: Fitzroy Dearborn. pp. 1138–1139. ISBN 978-1579582425.
- Roth, Cecil (2010) [1939]. The Magnificent Rothschilds (facsimile reprint ed.). Kessinger Publishing. ISBN 978-1164500780.
- Wilson, Derek (1988). Rothschild: A Story of Wealth and Power. Andre Deutsch Ltd. ISBN 978-0233979991.

Parliament of the United Kingdom
Preceded by George Lyall; John Masterman; Lord John Russell; James Pattison	Member of Parliament for the City of London; 1847 – 1868; With: James Pattison to 1849; John Masterman to 1857; Lord John Russell to 1861; Sir James Duke, Bt 1849–65; Robert Wigram Crawford from 1857; Western Wood 1861–63; George Goschen from 1863; William Lawrence from 1864	Succeeded by Charles Bell; George Goschen; William Lawrence; Robert Wigram Crawford
Preceded by Charles Bell; George Goschen; William Lawrence; Robert Wigram Crawford	Member of Parliament for the City of London; 1869 – 1874; With: Robert Wigram Crawford; George Goschen; William Lawrence	Succeeded by Philip Twells; William Cotton; John Gellibrand Hubbard; George Goschen
Titles of nobility of the Austrian Empire
Preceded by Nathan Mayer Rothschild	Baron de Rothschild; 1836–1879	Succeeded by Nathan Rothschild
