= George Goschen, 1st Viscount Goschen =

British statesman (1831–1907)

The Right Honourable The Viscount Goschen PC DL FBA
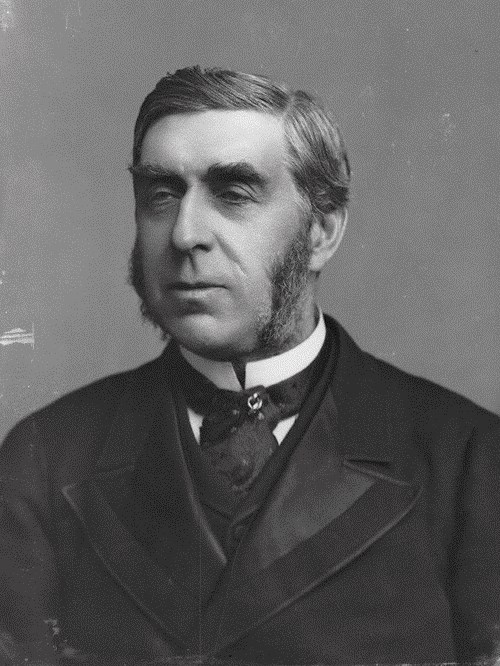
- Goschen c. 1883

First Lord of the Admiralty
- In office 29 June 1895 – 12 November 1900
- Prime Minister: The Marquess of Salisbury
- Preceded by: The Earl Spencer
- Succeeded by: The Earl of Selborne

Chancellor of the Exchequer
- In office 14 January 1887 – 11 August 1892
- Prime Minister: The Marquess of Salisbury
- Preceded by: Lord Randolph Churchill
- Succeeded by: Sir William Vernon Harcourt
Ministerial offices 1865–1874
First Lord of the Admiralty
In office 24 March 1871 – 17 February 1874
Prime Minister	William Ewart Gladstone
Preceded by	Hugh Childers
Succeeded by	George Ward Hunt
President of the Poor Law Board
In office 3 December 1868 – 24 March 1871
Prime Minister	William Ewart Gladstone
Preceded by	The Earl of Devon
Succeeded by	James Stansfeld
Chancellor of the Duchy of Lancaster
In office 26 January 1866 – 26 June 1866
Prime Minister	The Earl Russell
Preceded by	The Earl of Clarendon
Succeeded by	Thomas Edward Taylor
Paymaster General Vice-President of the Board of Trade
In office 29 November 1865 – 12 March 1866
Prime Minister	The Earl Russell
Preceded by	William Hutt
Succeeded by	William Monsell
Parliamentary offices
Member of the House of Lords Lord Temporal
In office 18 December 1900 – 7 February 1907
Preceded by	Peerage created
Succeeded by	2nd Viscount Goschen
Member of Parliament for Westminster St George's
In office 9 February 1887 – 25 September 1900
Preceded by	Lord Algernon Percy
Succeeded by	Hon. Heneage Legge
Member of Parliament for Edinburgh East
In office 18 December 1885 – 26 June 1886
Preceded by	Constituency created
Succeeded by	Robert Wallace
Member of Parliament for Ripon
In office 27 April 1880 – 18 November 1885
Preceded by	Earl de Grey
Succeeded by	William Harker
Member of Parliament for City of London
In office 2 June 1863 – 24 March 1880
Preceded by	Western Wood
Succeeded by	William Lawrence

Personal details
- Born: 10 August 1831 London, England
- Died: 7 February 1907 (aged 75) London, England
- Party: Liberal; Liberal Unionist; Conservative
- Education: Rugby School
- Alma mater: Oriel College, Oxford

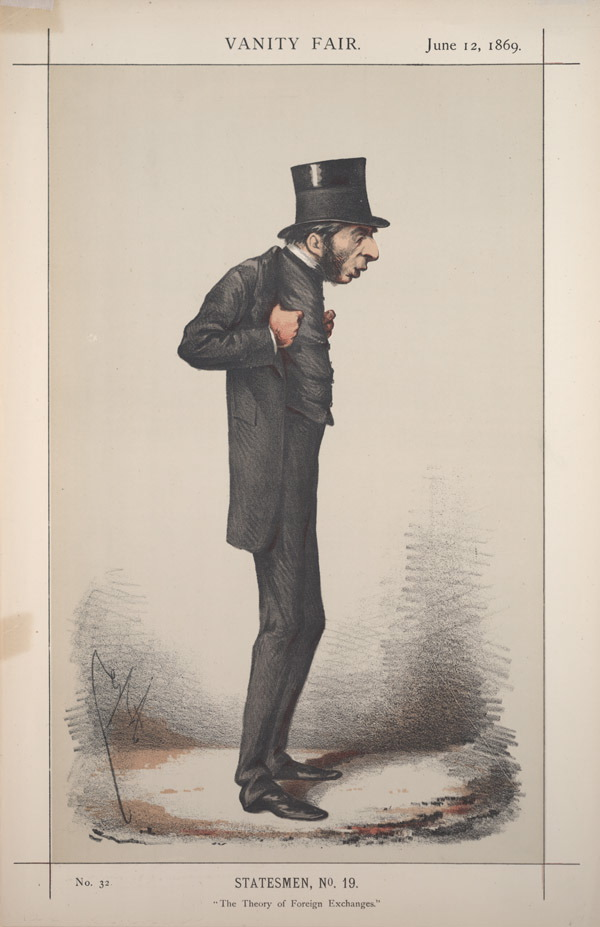
Vanity Fair caricature of Goschen: "The Theory of Foreign Exchanges"

George Joachim Goschen, 1st Viscount Goschen (10 August 1831 – 7 February 1907), was a British statesman and businessman best remembered for being "forgotten" by Lord Randolph Churchill. He was initially a Liberal, then a Liberal Unionist before joining the Conservative Party in 1893.

While Chancellor of the Exchequer, in 1888, he introduced the Goschen formula to allocate funding for Scotland and Ireland.

== Background, education and business career ==
He was born in London, the son of Wilhelm Heinrich (William Henry) Goschen, who emigrated from Leipzig. His grandfather was the prominent German printer Georg Joachim Göschen. He was educated at Rugby under Tait, and at Oriel College, Oxford, where he took a first in Literae Humaniores and served as President of the Oxford Union. He entered his father's firm of "Frühling & Göschen", of Austin Friars, in 1853, and three years later became a director of the Bank of England. From 1874 to 1880, Goschen was Governor (Company chairman) of the Hudson's Bay Company, North America's oldest company (established by English royal charter in 1670).

== Political career, 1863–1885 ==
In 1863 he was returned without opposition as one of the four MPs for the City of London in the Liberal interest, and he was reelected in 1865. In November of the same year he was appointed Vice-President of the Board of Trade and Paymaster General, and in January 1866 he was made Chancellor of the Duchy of Lancaster, with a seat in the cabinet. When Gladstone became prime minister in December 1868, Goschen joined the cabinet as President of the Poor Law Board, until March 1871, when he succeeded Childers as First Lord of the Admiralty. In the 1874 general election he was the only Liberal returned for the City of London, and by a narrow majority. Being sent to Cairo in 1876 as delegate for the British holders of Egyptian bonds in 1876, he concluded an agreement with the Khedive to arrange for the conversion of the debt.

In 1878 his views on the county franchise question prevented him from voting consistently with his party. With the City of London becoming more Conservative, Goschen did not stand there at the 1880 general election, but was instead returned for Ripon in Yorkshire, which he represented until 1885, when he was returned for Edinburgh East. He declined to join Gladstone's government in 1880 and refused the post of Viceroy of India, but he became special ambassador to the Porte, where he settled the Montenegrin and Greek frontier questions in 1880 and 1881. He was made an Ecclesiastical Commissioner in 1882. When Sir Henry Brand was raised to the peerage in 1884, Goschen was offered the role of Speaker of the House of Commons, but he declined. During the parliament of 1880–1885 he frequently found himself at odds with his party, especially over franchise extension and questions of foreign policy. When Gladstone adopted Home Rule for Ireland, Goschen followed Lord Hartington (afterwards 8th Duke of Devonshire) and became one of the most active of the Liberal Unionists. He failed to retain his seat for Edinburgh at the election in July of that year.

== Political career, 1885–1895 ==
National Debt (Conversion) Act 1888 (Note: Section 33.)
- Act of Parliament
- Parliament of the United Kingdom
- Long title: An Act for reducing the Rate of Interest on the National Debt.
- Citation: 51 & 52 Vict. c. 2
- Territorial extent: United Kingdom

Dates
- Royal assent: 27 March 1888
- Commencement: 27 March 1888 (Note: The Acts of Parliament (Commencement) Act 1793.)
Other legislation
Amended by	Bank Act 1892; Statute Law Revision Act 1908; Savings Banks Act 1929; Statute Law Revision Act 1950; Statute Law Revision Act 1959; Statute Law Revision Act 1964; National Loans Act 1968; Decimal Currency Act 1969; Statute Law (Repeals) Act 1986

Status: Partially repealed

Text of statute as originally enacted

Text of the National Debt (Conversion) Act 1888 as in force today (including any amendments) within the United Kingdom, from legislation.gov.uk.

On the resignation of Lord Randolph Churchill in December 1886, Goschen, though a Liberal Unionist, accepted Lord Salisbury's invitation to join his ministry as Chancellor of the Exchequer. Churchill had assumed he could not be replaced and famously commented that he had "forgotten Goschen" was a potential alternative. Goschen needed a seat in Parliament and so stood in a by-election in the Liverpool Exchange constituency but was defeated by seven votes in January 1887. He was then elected for the strongly-Conservative St George's, Hanover Square, in February. His chancellorship was memorable for his successful conversion of the National Debt in 1888. He also introduced the first UK road tax, implemented in the form of two vehicle duties, on locomotives and carts.

According to Roy Jenkins, a former Chancellor of the Exchequer, "Whether Goschen was a good Chancellor is more problematical. His main and real achievement was the conversion in 1888 of the core of the national debt from a 3 percent to a 2.75 percent and ultimately 2.5 percent basis. For the rest he was a stolid and uninnovating Chancellor." Professor Thomas Skinner wrote, "Yet there remains a feeling that he failed to accomplish much of what needed to be done".

The University of Aberdeen again conferred upon him the honour of the rectorship in 1888, he received an honorary LL.D from the University of Cambridge in the same year, and he received a similar honour from the University of Edinburgh in 1890.

Following the defeat of Salisbury's government in 1892, Goschen moved into opposition. Though he had been a leading Liberal Unionist as Chancellor of the Exchequer, Goschen did not stand against Joseph Chamberlain for the leadership of the party in the House of Commons 1892, following the departure of Hartington to the House of Lords as the Duke of Devonshire. Unable to work with Chamberlain, Goschen left the Liberal Unionists and joined the Conservatives in 1893. One obvious sign of his change of allegiance within the Unionist alliance was when he joined the exclusively Conservative Carlton Club in the same year.

== Political career, 1895–1907 ==
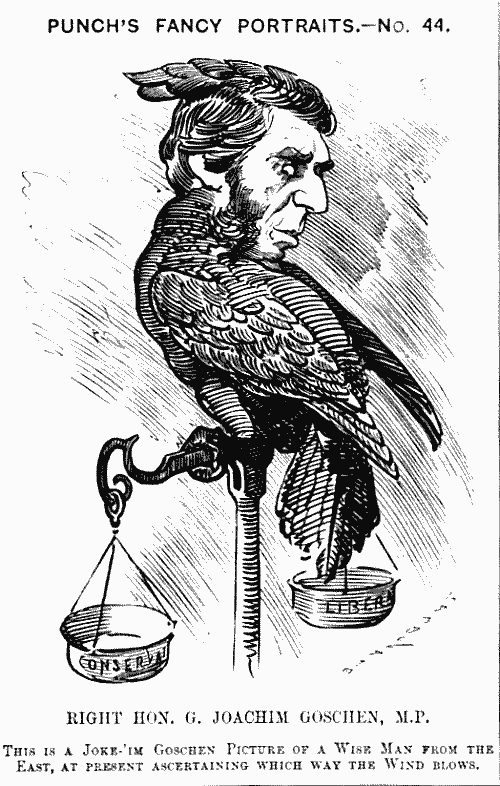
Caricature from Punch, 13 August 1881: "This is a Joke-'im Goschen Picture of a Wise Man from the East, at present ascertaining which way the wind blows"

From 1895 to 1900 Goschen was First Lord of the Admiralty. He retired in 1900 and was raised to the peerage as Viscount Goschen of Hawkhurst, Kent. Though retired from active politics he continued to take a great interest in public affairs, and when Chamberlain started his tariff reform movement in 1903, Lord Goschen was one of the weightiest champions of free trade on the Unionist side.

== Other public positions ==
In educational subjects Goschen had always taken the greatest interest, his best known, but by no means his only, contribution to popular culture being his participation in the University Extension Movement. His first efforts in parliament were devoted to advocating the abolition of religious tests and the admission of Dissenters to the universities. His published works indicate how ably he combined the wise study of economics with a practical instinct for business-like progress, without neglecting the more ideal aspects of human life. In addition to his well-known work on The Theory of Foreign Exchanges, he published several financial and political pamphlets and addresses on educational and social subjects, among them being,The Cultivation of the Imagination, Liverpool, 1877, and that on Intellectual Interest, Aberdeen, 1888. He was President of the Royal Statistical Society, 1886–88.

He also wrote a biography of his grandfather, The Life and Times of George Joachim Goschen, publisher and printer of Leipzig (1903). This culminated a long-standing project to refute allegations of Jewish ancestry, giving his earliest ascertainable ancestor as a Lutheran pastor named Joachimus Gosenius, recorded in 1609. However, it did not prevent his family from being erroneously classed as of Jewish origin in the German genealogical work known as The Semi Gotha, first published 1913.

== Private life ==
Goschen died on 7 February 1907. He had married, in 1857, Lucy, the daughter of John Dalley, and had 6 children. He was succeeded by his eldest son George (1866–1952), who was also a Conservative politician, served as Governor of Madras and married the daughter of Lord Cranbrook. His youngest son was William Henry Goschen KBE (1870-1943).

== Cultural references ==
- Goschen appears as a minor character in the historical-mystery novel Stone's Fall, by Iain Pears.
- He is referenced in the poem Away from It All by New Zealand poet A. R. D. Fairburn:

I want to leave behind me all rancid emotion.
I want to be alone. I want to forget Goschen.

== Notes ==
Parliament of the United Kingdom
Preceded by Baron Lionel de Rothschild; Sir James Duke, Bt; Robert Wigram Crawford; Western Wood	Member of Parliament for City of London; 1863–1880; With: Robert Wigram Crawford 1863–1874; Sir James Duke, Bt 1863–1865; Baron Lionel de Rothschild 1863–1868; William Lawrence 1865–1874; Charles Bell 1868–1869; Baron Lionel de Rothschild 1869–1874; William Cotton 1874–1880; Philip Twells 1874–1880; John Hubbard 1874–1880	Succeeded by John Hubbard; William Cotton; William Lawrence; Sir Robert Fowler
Preceded by Earl de Grey	Member of Parliament for Ripon; 1880–1885	Succeeded by William Harker
New constituency	Member of Parliament for Edinburgh East; 1885–1886	Succeeded by Robert Wallace
Preceded by Lord Algernon Percy	Member of Parliament for St George, Hanover Square; 1887–1900	Succeeded by Heneage Legge
Political offices
Preceded by Sir William Hutt	Paymaster General; 1865–1866	Succeeded by William Monsell
Preceded by The Earl of Clarendon	Chancellor of the Duchy of Lancaster; 1866	Succeeded by The Earl of Devon
Preceded by The Earl of Devon	President of the Poor Law Board; 1868–1871	Succeeded by James Stansfeld
Preceded by Hugh Childers	First Lord of the Admiralty; 1871–1874	Succeeded by George Ward Hunt
Preceded by Lord Randolph Churchill	Chancellor of the Exchequer; 1887–1892	Succeeded by Sir William Harcourt
Preceded by The Earl Spencer	First Lord of the Admiralty; 1895–1900	Succeeded by The Earl of Selborne
Academic offices
Preceded by The Marquess of Lothian	Rector of the University of Edinburgh; 1890–1893	Succeeded by The Lord Robertson
Preceded by The Marquess of Salisbury	Chancellor of the University of Oxford; 1903–1907	Succeeded by The Lord Curzon of Kedleston
Peerage of the United Kingdom
New creation	Viscount Goschen; 1900–1907	Succeeded by George Goschen
