= William Lawrence (London MP) =

English builder and politician

Sir William Lawrence
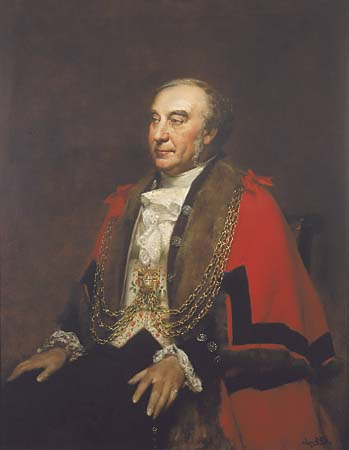
- William Lawrence, Lord Mayor of London.

Member of Parliament for City of London

Personal details
- Born: 1818
- Died: 18 April 1897 (aged 78–79)

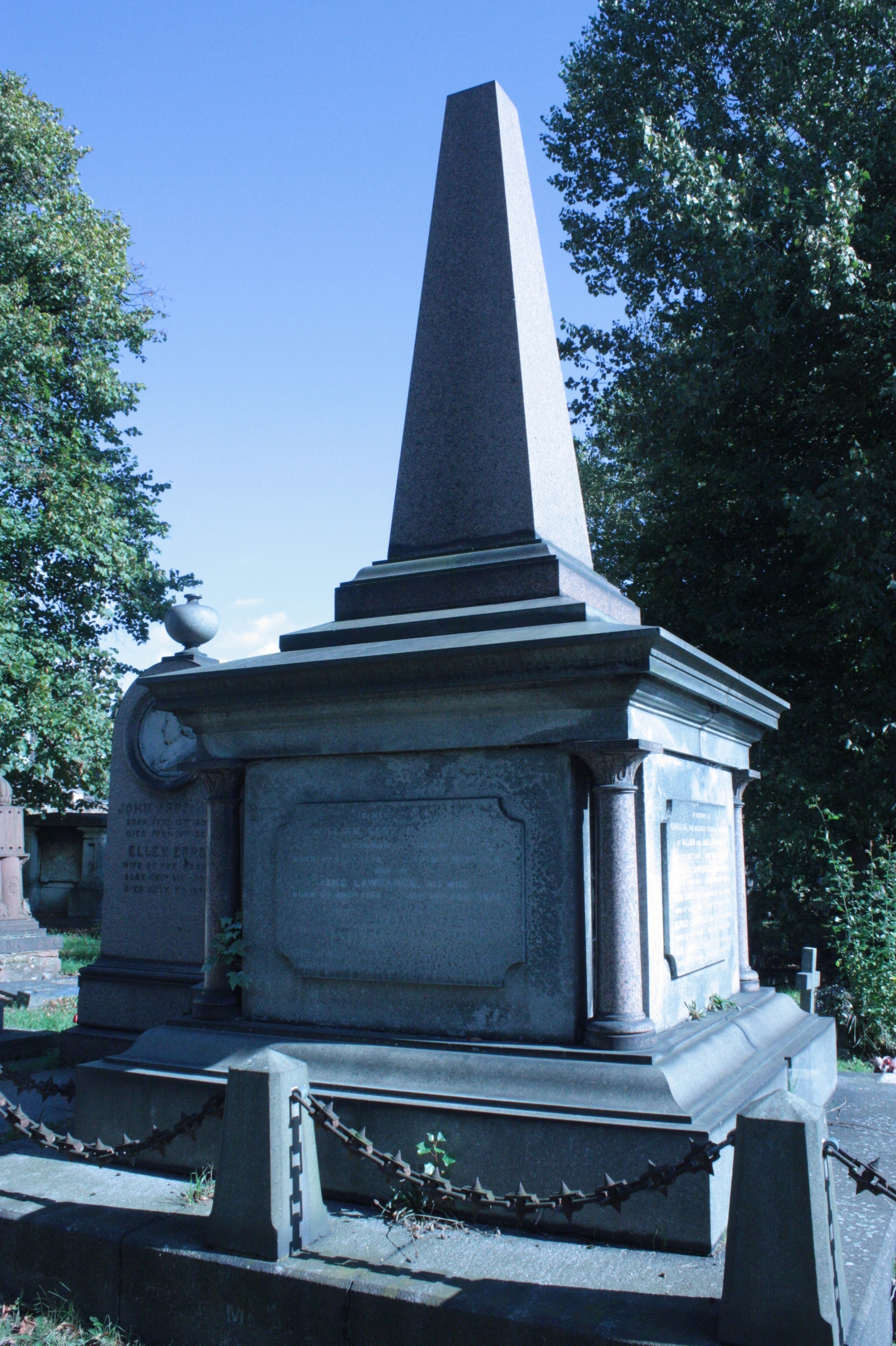
The grave of Sir William Lawrence MP, Kensal Green Cemetery

Sir William Lawrence (1818 – 18 April 1897) was an English builder and Liberal Party politician who sat in the House of Commons in two periods between 1865 and 1885.

== Biography ==
Lawrence was the eldest son of William Lawrence, an alderman of the City of London, and his wife Jane Clarke, daughter of James Clarke. He was a builder in London and a partner in the firm of William Lawrence and Sons Builders. In 1857 he was High Sheriff of London and Middlesex for a year and in 1863 to 1864 Lord Mayor of London. He was a Deputy Lieutenant for the City of London, a J.P. for Middlesex and Westminster and an alderman of London.

At the 1865 general election Lawrence was elected as a Member of Parliament (MP) for the City of London, but lost the seat in 1874. He was re-elected at the 1880 general election and held the seat until the next general election, in 1885, when representation was reduced from four to two under the Redistribution of Seats Act 1885. He was the last Liberal to represent the City of London.

At the 1885 general election he stood in Paddington South as an independent liberal, but was unsuccessful, winning only 7.2% of the votes.

Lawrence died unmarried at the age of 78. He is buried in the eastern roundel of Kensal Green Cemetery in London, not far from the entrance.

The address at his funeral was given by Brooke Herford, minister of Rosslyn Hill Unitarian Chapel where he, like his father, had worshipped. His brothers Sir James Lawrence, 1st Baronet and Sir Edwin Durning-Lawrence were also M.P.s. James was MP for Lambeth, Edwin for Truro. His nephew Frederick Pethick-Lawrence was a pacifist and suffragist, and later an MP.

Parliament of the United Kingdom
Preceded by Sir James Duke, Bt; Robert Wigram Crawford; George Goschen; Baron Lionel de Rothschild	Member of Parliament for the City of London; 1865–1874; With: George Goschen 1863–80; Robert Wigram Crawford 1857–74; Baron Lionel de Rothschild 1847–68; Charles Bell 1868–69; Baron Lionel de Rothschild 1869–80	Succeeded by Philip Twells; John Hubbard; George Goschen; William Cotton
Preceded by Philip Twells; George Goschen; William Cotton; John Gellibrand Hubbard	Member of Parliament for City of London; 1880–1885; With: William Cotton 1874–85; John Gellibrand Hubbard 1874–87; Sir Robert Fowler, Bt 1880–91	Succeeded by Sir Robert Nicholas Fowler; John Hubbard
Civic offices
Preceded by Sir William Rose	Lord Mayor of London; 1863 – 1864	Succeeded by Warren Stormes Hale
