= Philip Twells Memorial Fountain =

Memorial fountain in London

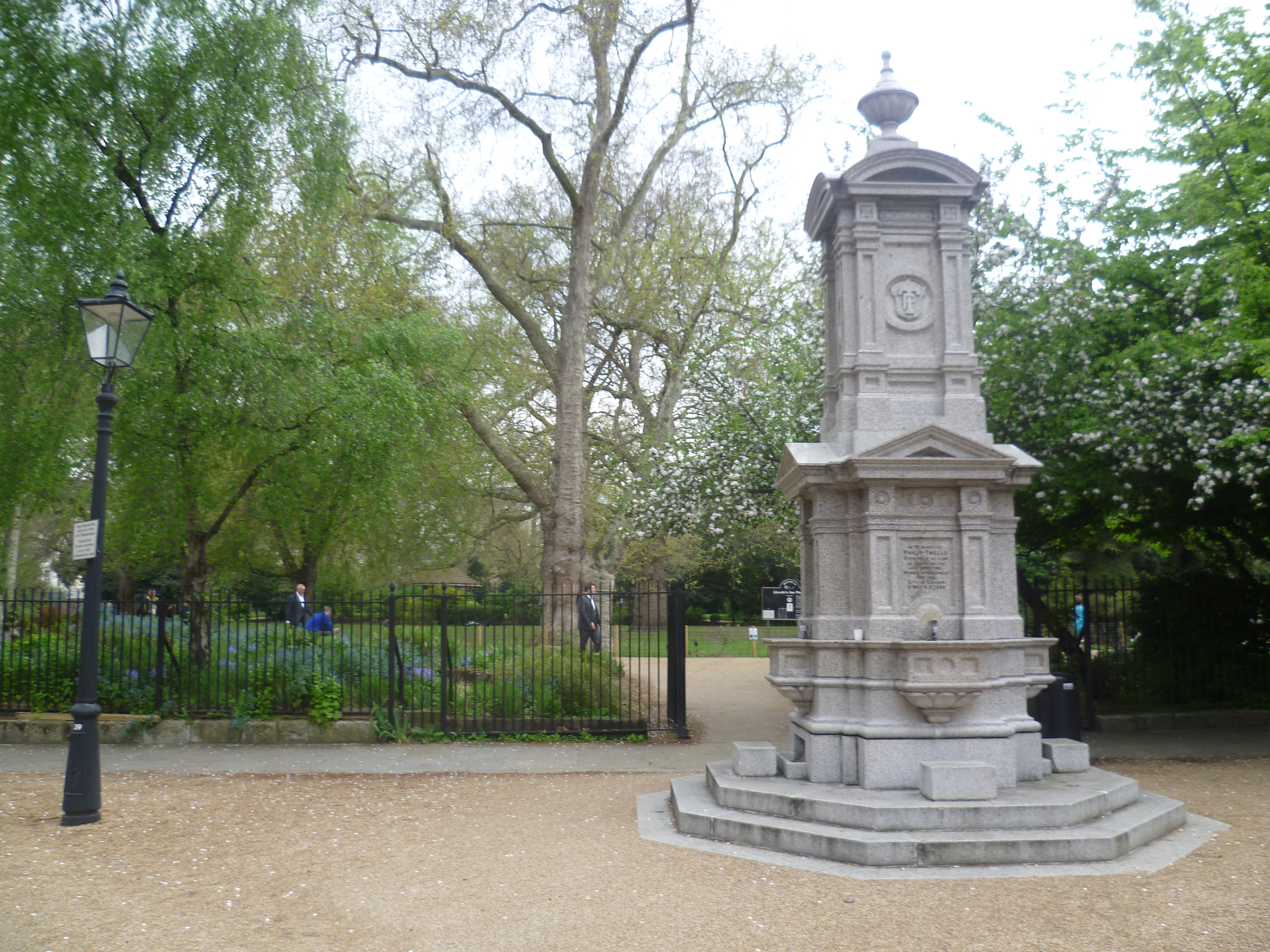
- The fountain in front of a gate into Lincoln's Inn Fields

General information
- Location: London, England
- Coordinates: 51.5160°N 0.1149°W
- Completed: 1880

Listed Building – Grade II
- Official name: Memorial Drinking Fountain in South East Corner of the Square
- Designated: 14 May 1974
- Reference no.: 1379338

The Philip Twells Memorial Fountain is a memorial and drinking fountain located at the south-east corner of Lincoln's Inn Fields in London. It is Grade II listed by English Heritage.

The fountain was built to commemorate Philip Twells, who was an Member of Parliament for the City of London as well as a barrister for the nearby Lincoln's Inn. The fountain was erected in 1880 after Twells' death, commissioned by his wife, its design rendered in granite.
