= David Henry Stone =

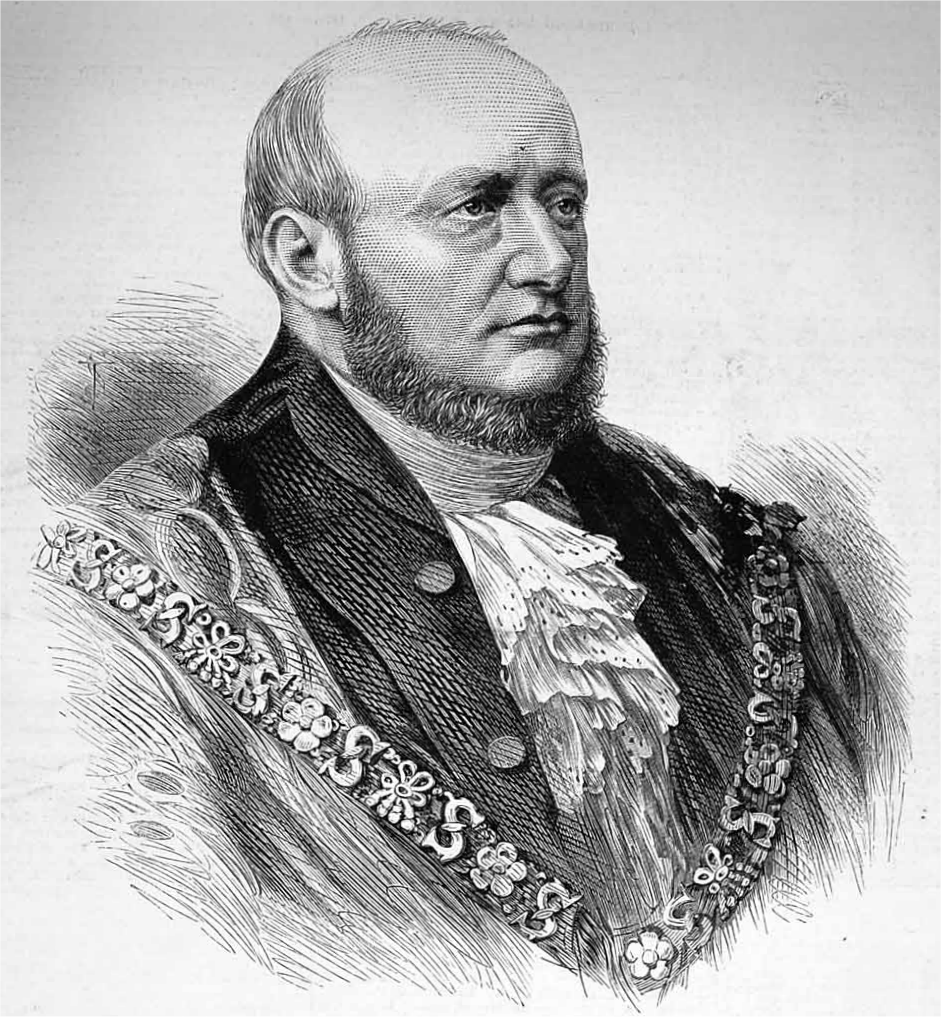
Alderman Stone as the new Lord Mayor of London.

Alderman David Henry Stone (1812 - 26 February 1890). His family were the owners of a large amount of land near Lewes for at least three centuries. He was the nephew of Thomas Farncomb the Lord Mayor of London of 1849. Educated at St Olave's Grammar School, in Southwark. He practiced as a solicitor and an attorney from 1839 until 1864.

He first became associated with the City of London Corporation in 1840, when he was appointed Under-Sheriff to Alderman Farncombe. He was Alderman of Bassishaw from 1864 until 1890 In 1867 he was appointed Sheriff of London and in 1874 was elected to Lord Mayor of London. He was Treasurer of St. Thomas' Hospital from 1877 to 1890; Treasurer of the Honourable Artillery Company from 1880 to 1890; on the Metropolitan Board of Works from 1866 to 1868 and again in 1871 to 1874, and the last Principal of Clifford's Inn. From 1863 he resided at 'Fairwood' on Sydenham Hill, in the affluent suburb south of the city.

== Further info ==
- Aldermen of the City of London: Bassishaw ward by Alfred P. Beaven, 1908
- Survey of London: volume 25: St George's Fields (The parishes of St. George the Martyr Southwark and St. Mary Newington) edited by Ida Darlington, 1955
- Ye parish of Camerwell : a brief account of the parish of Camberwell : its history and antiquities by William Harnett Blanch, page 407
- A search for his name in The proceedings of the Old Bailey

Civic offices
Preceded by Sir Andrew Lusk, Bt	Lord Mayor of London; 1873 – 1874	Succeeded by Sir William Cotton
