= Robert Wigram Crawford =

British merchant and politician

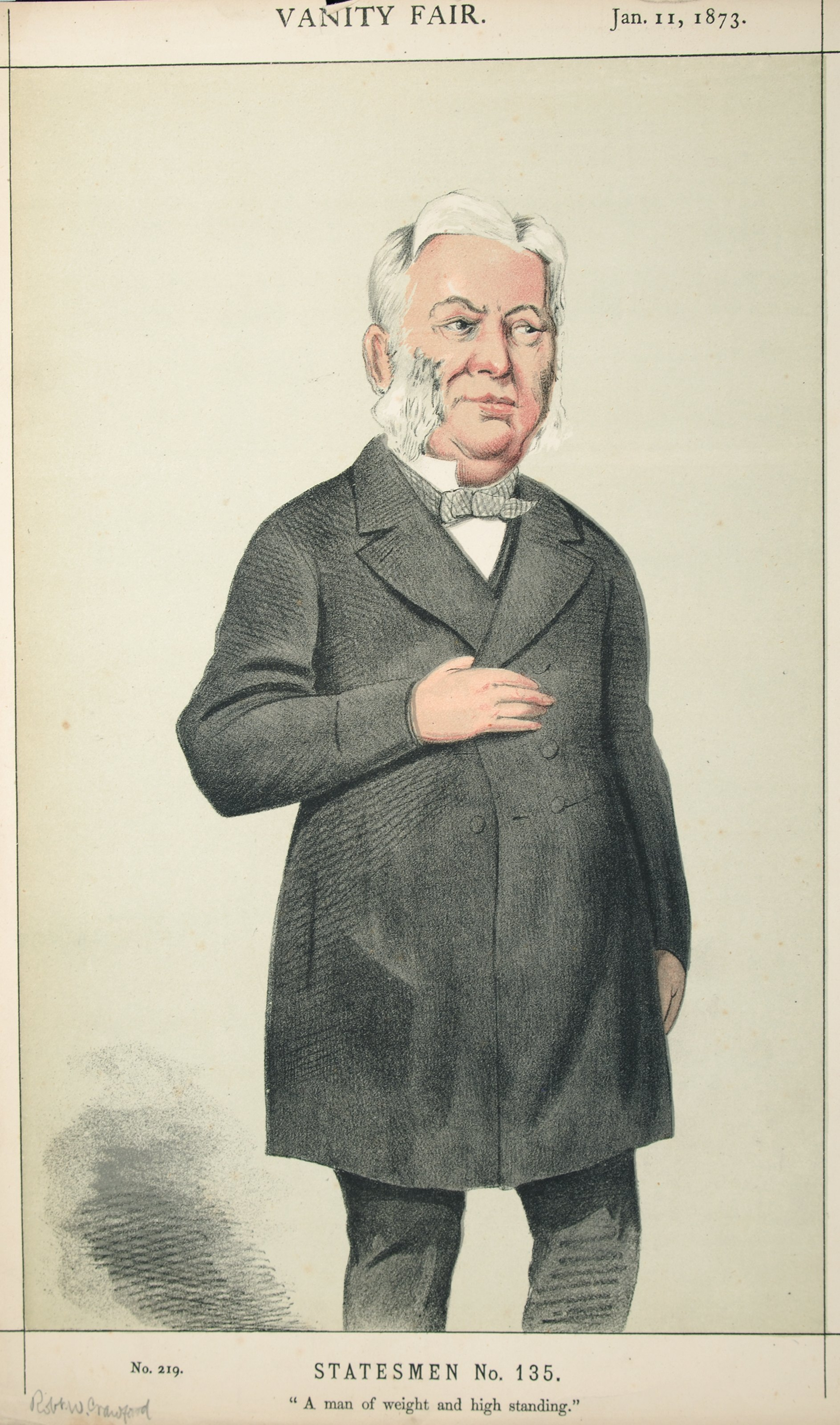
"A man of weight and high standing" Crawford as caricatured by Melchiorre Delfico in Vanity Fair, January 1873

Robert Wigram Crawford (18 April 1813 – 30 July 1889) was a British East India merchant, Governor of the Bank of England, and a Liberal Party politician who sat in the House of Commons from 1857 to 1874.

Crawford was the son of William Crawford, M.P. for London 1833–41, and his wife Dorothy Elizabeth Rees. He lived in Bombay for several years, where he was a partner in the firm of Remington & Co. He then headed the firm of Crawford, Colvin, and Co., East India Merchants of London. (See the Colvin family for more on these connections.) He was chairman of the East Indian and the Mexican Railway Companies. In 1869, he became a Governor of the Bank of England, having earlier served as its Deputy Governor Black Friday (1869) occurred during Crawford's tenure as Governor. He was also a Commissioner of Lieutenancy for London, and a Fellow of the Royal Geographical Society.

Crawford stood for parliament at Harwich in 1851, where he was elected Member of Parliament when the sitting member was unseated on petition, but was himself displaced on petition because it was alleged that the poll had closed three minutes before the legal hour. In 1852 he was proposed for the City of London, but declined to become a candidate although 3765 votes had been cast for him. At the 1857 general election Crawford was elected MP for the City of London. He held the seat until 1874.

Crawford married Margaret Urquhart Cruikshank, daughter of the Rev. John Cruickshank, of Turriff, Scotland in 1836. His sister Jane married Henry Ray Freshfield, of the family of lawyers; as Jane Freshfield she wrote travelogues of mountaineering in the Swiss Alps.

Crawford died at the age of 76 in 1889.

The caricature hangs on the fifth floor of Norman Shaw North, a building which houses many MPs. The caricature is signed by Robert Wigram Crawford himself.

Parliament of the United Kingdom
| Preceded by Henry Prinsep; John Bagshaw | Member of Parliament for Harwich; May 1851 – April 1852; With: John Bagshaw | Succeeded by Sir Fitzroy Kelly; John Bagshaw |
| Preceded by John Masterman; Lord John Russell; Sir James Duke, Bt; Baron Lionel de Rothschild | Member of Parliament for City of London; 1857 – 1874; With: Sir James Duke, Bt 1849–65; Baron Lionel de Rothschild 1847–68; Lord John Russell 1841–61; Western Wood 1861–63; George Goschen 1863–80; William Lawrence 1865–74; Charles Bell 1868–69; Baron Lionel de Rothschild 1869–74 | Succeeded by William Cotton; Philip Twells; John Hubbard; Baron Lionel de Rothschild |
