= Western Wood (Queensland politician) =

Australian politician

The Hon Western Wood

Member of the Queensland Legislative Council
- In office 26 April 1861 – 20 March 1868

Personal details
- Born: Western Wood; 22 May 1830 London, England
- Died: 17 April 1878 (aged 47) Great Marlow, Buckinghamshire, England
- Spouse: Lucy Elizabeth Darvall (m.1862 d.1907)
- Relations: Western Wood (father), Dick Wood (grandson)
- Occupation: Pastoralist, Police magistrate

Western Wood (1830–1878) was a politician in Queensland, Australia. He was a Member of the Queensland Legislative Council.

== Early life ==
Western Wood was born on 22 May 1830 in London, England, the son of Western Wood and his wife Sarah Letitia (née Morris). He attended Eton College.

Wood immigrated to Queensland about 1858, where he engaged unsuccessfully in pastoral and mercantile activities.

On 9 January 1862, Wood married Lucy Elizabeth Darvall, daughter of Fredrick Orme Darvall.

== Politics ==
Western Wood was given a lifetime appointment to the Queensland Legislative Council on 26 April 1861. He resigned from the Council on 20 March 1868 in order to take up an appointment as police magistrate at Port Denison (now known as Bowen).

== Later life ==
Wood's appointment as a police magistrate was short-lived, as he charged with embezzlement in April 1869. In May 1869, the charge of embezzlement was withdrawn and replaced with a charge of having fraudulently appropriated £100 which he had received for the use of the trustees of the Bowen Cemetery. He was dismissed as police magistrate on 22 May 1869. By July 1869, there were further charges in relation to £75 intended for the Kennedy Hospital. A legal dispute then erupted as to whether the case should be dealt with in Bowen or in Rockhampton, which concluded that the case should be dealt with in Rockhampton. Wood strenuously objected to that location and refused to attend the court, resulting in a bench warrant for his arrest. Having been arrested, he was again released on bail. The matter dragged on, until Western Wood fled Queensland in March 1870, claiming he was disgusted at how long it was taking to have the matter resolved.

In November 1875, Wood initiated divorce proceedings against his wife Lucy, naming George Cresswell Crump as a co-respondent. However, there is no evidence that the divorce was awarded.

Western Wood died on 17 April 1878 in Great Marlow, Buckinghamshire, England.

His widow Lucy married George Cresswell Crump on 7 May 1878 in Brisbane.
