= Lincoln's Inn Fields =

Public square in London

Coordinates: 51.5161°N 0.1166°W

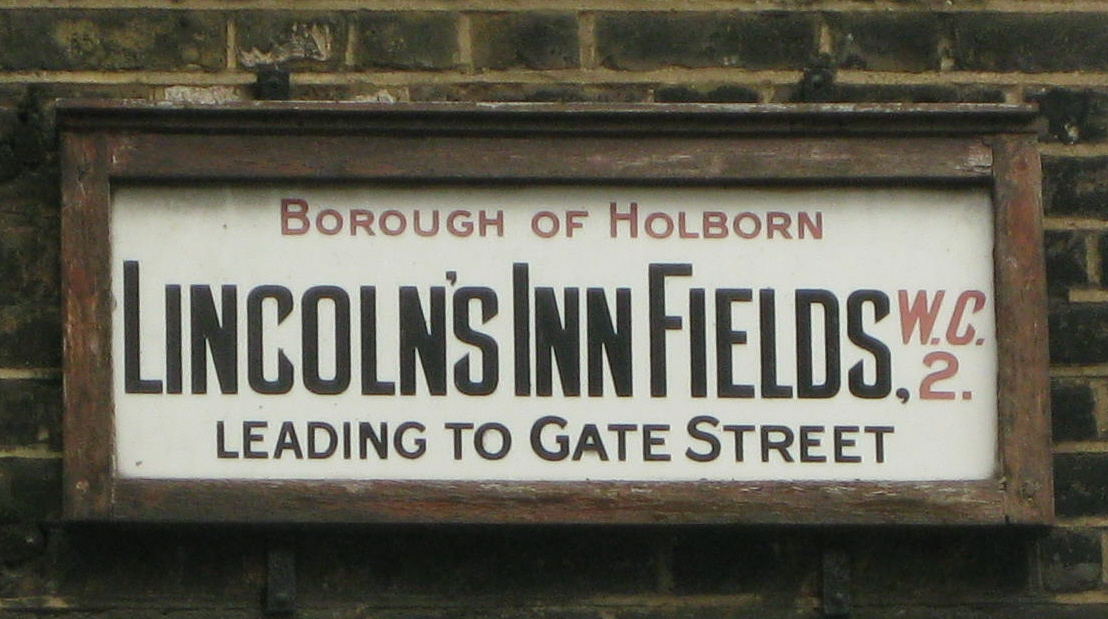
Street sign

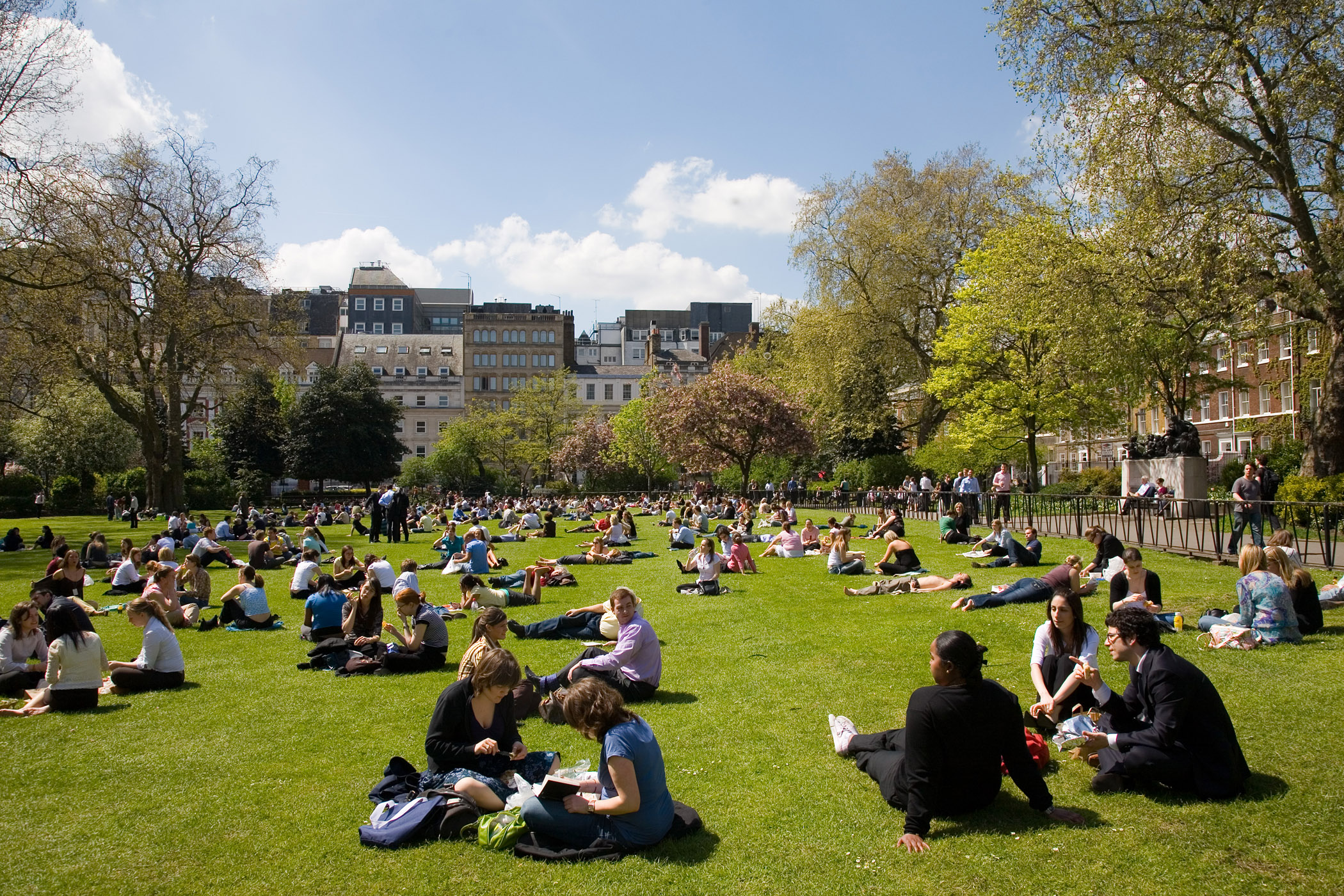
Lincoln's Inn Fields in spring 2006

Lincoln's Inn Fields is located in Holborn and is the largest public square in London. It was laid out in the 1630s under the initiative of the speculative builder and contractor William Newton, "the first in a long series of entrepreneurs who took a hand in developing London", as Sir Nikolaus Pevsner observes. The original plan for "laying out and planting" these fields, drawn by the hand of Inigo Jones, was said still to be seen in Lord Pembroke's collection at Wilton House in the 19th century, but its location is now unknown.

The West End grounds, which had remained private property, were acquired by London County Council in 1895 using powers granted by the London County Council (Improvements) Act 1894 (57 & 58 Vict. c. clxxxv), and opened to the public by its chairman, Sir John Hutton, the same year. The square is today managed by the London Borough of Camden and forms part of the southern boundary of that borough with the City of Westminster. It is grade II listed on the Register of Historic Parks and Gardens of Special Historic Interest.

Lincoln's Inn Fields takes its name from the adjacent Lincoln's Inn, of which the private gardens are separated from the Fields by a perimeter wall and a large gatehouse.

The grassed area in the centre of the Fields contains a court for tennis and netball, and a bandstand. It was previously used for corporate events, which are no longer permitted. Cricket and other sports are thought to have been played here in the 18th century.

Lincoln's Inn Fields in 1889 from Charles Booth, Life and Labour of the People in London: red areas are "middle-class, well-to-do"; blue areas are "Intermittent or casual earnings", and black areas are the "lowest class...occasional labourers, street sellers, loafers, criminals and semi-criminals".

== History ==
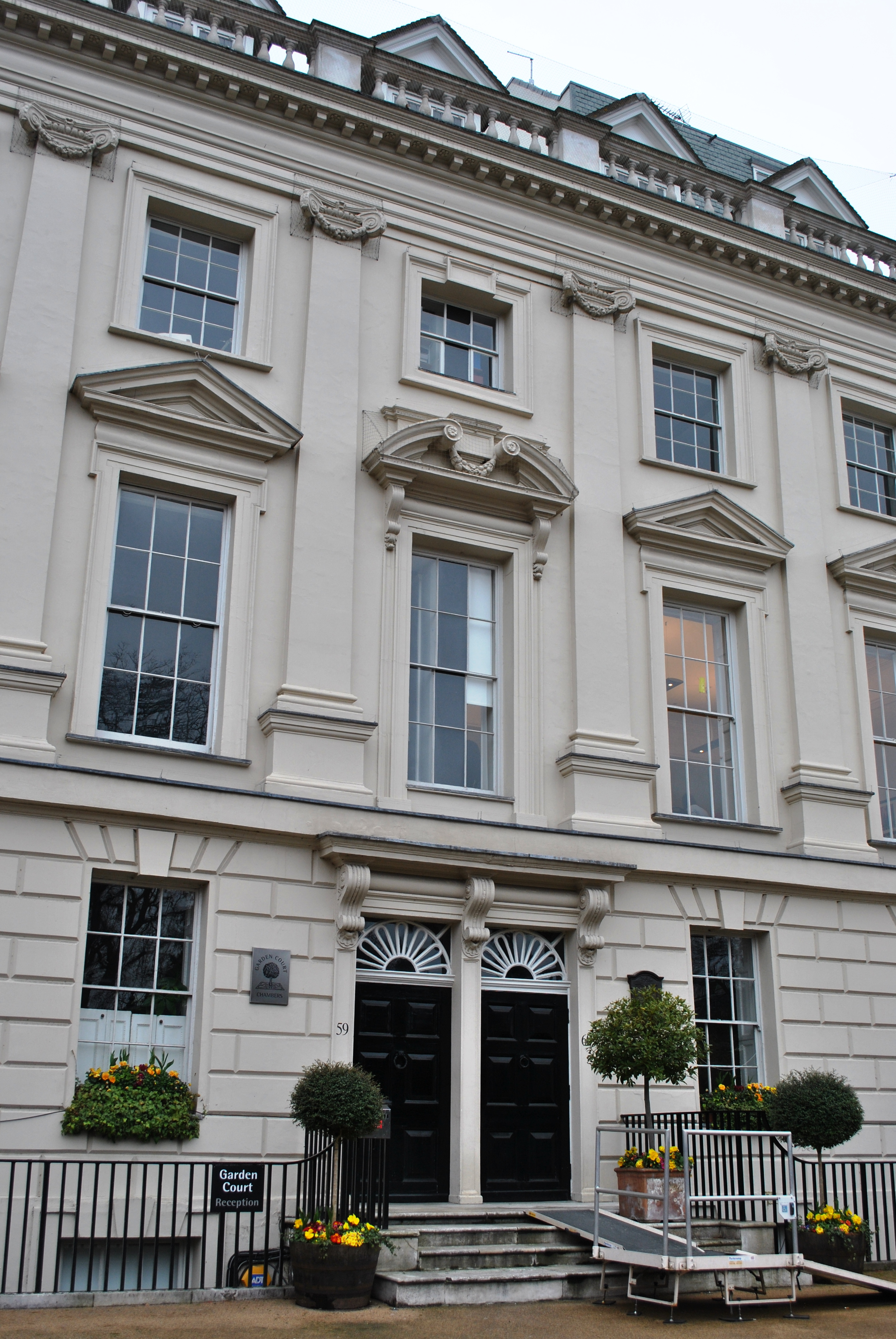
Lindsey House, 59–60 Lincoln's Inn Fields

Lincoln's Inn was situated in the county of Middlesex. Up to the 17th century cattle were grazed upon the fields, which were part of the Holborn grassland named Pursefield and belonged to St Giles Hospital. In the report of excavations of 64 Lincoln's Inn Fields, it is noted that one Katherine Smyth, the owner of the White Hart Inn on Drury Lane, leased the land from 1520. It then reverted to the Crown, and was used as pasture and occasionally for an execution.

The use of the pastures meant that turnstiles were placed around the square to enable pedestrians to enter without the animals escaping. Shops and other businesses developed along these footpaths, and some of these alleys still exist – the Great and Little Turnstile.

Schemes for redevelopment of the fields by Inigo Jones and Charles Cornwallis in 1613 and 1618 were unsuccessful. William Newton gained permission, however, to erect 32 houses in what became known as Lincoln's Inn Fields in 1638 for an annual fee of £5 6s 8d. However, the building licence was only given if the central area remained an outdoor space open to the public. Quarry pits were discovered in the excavations at No. 64 (see above), probably for building materials, in particular, gravel. In the fill of one was a fragment of a 'fuddling cup', a drinking vessel which made it deliberately difficult to drink from without spillage.

When originally laid out, Lincoln's Inn Fields was part of fashionable London. The completion of the houses that surrounded it proceeded at a leisurely pace, interrupted by the English Civil War. In 1659 James Cooper, Robert Henley, and Francis Finch and other owners of "certain parcels of ground in the fields, commonly called Lincoln's Inn Fields", were exempted from all forfeitures and penalties which they might incur in regard to any new buildings they might erect on three sides of the same fields, previously to 1 October in that year, provided that they paid for the public service one year's full value for every such house within one month of its erection; and provided that they should convey the "residue of the said fields" to the Society of Lincoln's Inn, for laying the same into walks for common use and benefit, whereby the annoyances which formerly have been in the same fields will be taken away, and passengers there for the future better secured." The oldest building from this early period is Lindsey House, 59–60 Lincoln's Inn Fields, which was built in 1640 and has been attributed to Inigo Jones. The builder may have been David Cunningham, 1st Baronet of Auchinhervie, a friend of the mason-sculptor Nicholas Stone, who also supervised the rebuilding of Berkhamsted Place for Charles I. It derives its name from a period of ownership in the 18th century by the earls of Lindsey.

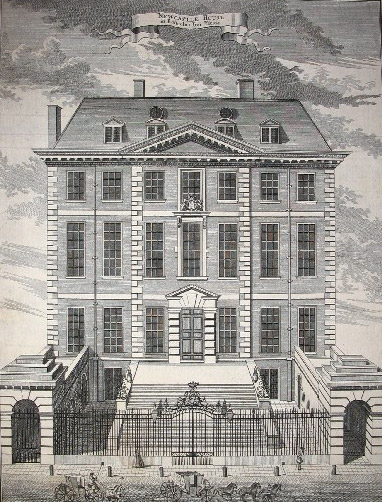
Newcastle House in 1754

Another seventeenth-century survival is now 66 Lincoln's Inn Fields, which was built for Lord Powis and known as Powis House. The charter of the Bank of England was sealed there on 27 July 1694. It was in 1705 acquired by the Duke of Newcastle (whereupon it became known as Newcastle House) who had it remodelled by Sir John Vanbrugh (following earlier work by Christopher Wren after a fire in 1684). It remains substantially in its form of c. 1700, although a remodelling in 1930 by Edwin Lutyens gives it a curiously pastiche appearance.

As London fashion moved west, Lincoln's Inn Fields was left to rich lawyers who were attracted by its proximity to the Inns of Court. In this way the former Newcastle House became in 1790 the premises of the firm of solicitors Farrer & Co, which is still there: their clients include Queen Elizabeth II.

The Lincoln's Inn Fields Theatre was located in the Fields from 1661 to 1848, when it was demolished. This, originally called the Duke's Theatre, was created by converting Lisle's Tennis Court. The theatre presented the first paid public performances of Henry Purcell's Dido and Aeneas in 1700, John Gay's The Beggar's Opera in January 1728, and George Frideric Handel's final two operas in 1740 and 1741.

Lincoln's Inn Fields was the site, in 1683, of the public beheading of Lord William Russell, son of the first Duke of Bedford, following his implication in the Rye House Plot for the attempted assassination of King Charles II. The executioner was Jack Ketch, who made such a poor job of it that four axe blows were required before the head was separated from the body; after the first stroke, Russell looked up and said to him "You dog, did I give you 10 guineas to use me so inhumanely?".

Sometime after 1735 the Fields were enclosed within an iron railing, on account of the then Master of the Rolls, Sir Joseph Jekyll, being ridden over by a horse. An alternative version of the story claims that Jekyll was attacked for his support of an act of Parliament (the Gin Act 1736) raising the price of gin.

From 1750 to 1992, the solicitors Frere Cholmeley were in premises on the north side of Lincoln's Inn Fields, after which their buildings were taken over by a leading set of commercial barristers' chambers, known as Essex Court Chambers after their own former premises at 4 Essex Court in the Temple. Essex Court Chambers now occupy five buildings, nos. 24–28 Lincoln's Inn Fields. Other barristers' chambers, including leading family law chambers 1GC Family Law, have since then also set up in Lincoln's Inn Fields, but solicitors' firms still outnumber them there.

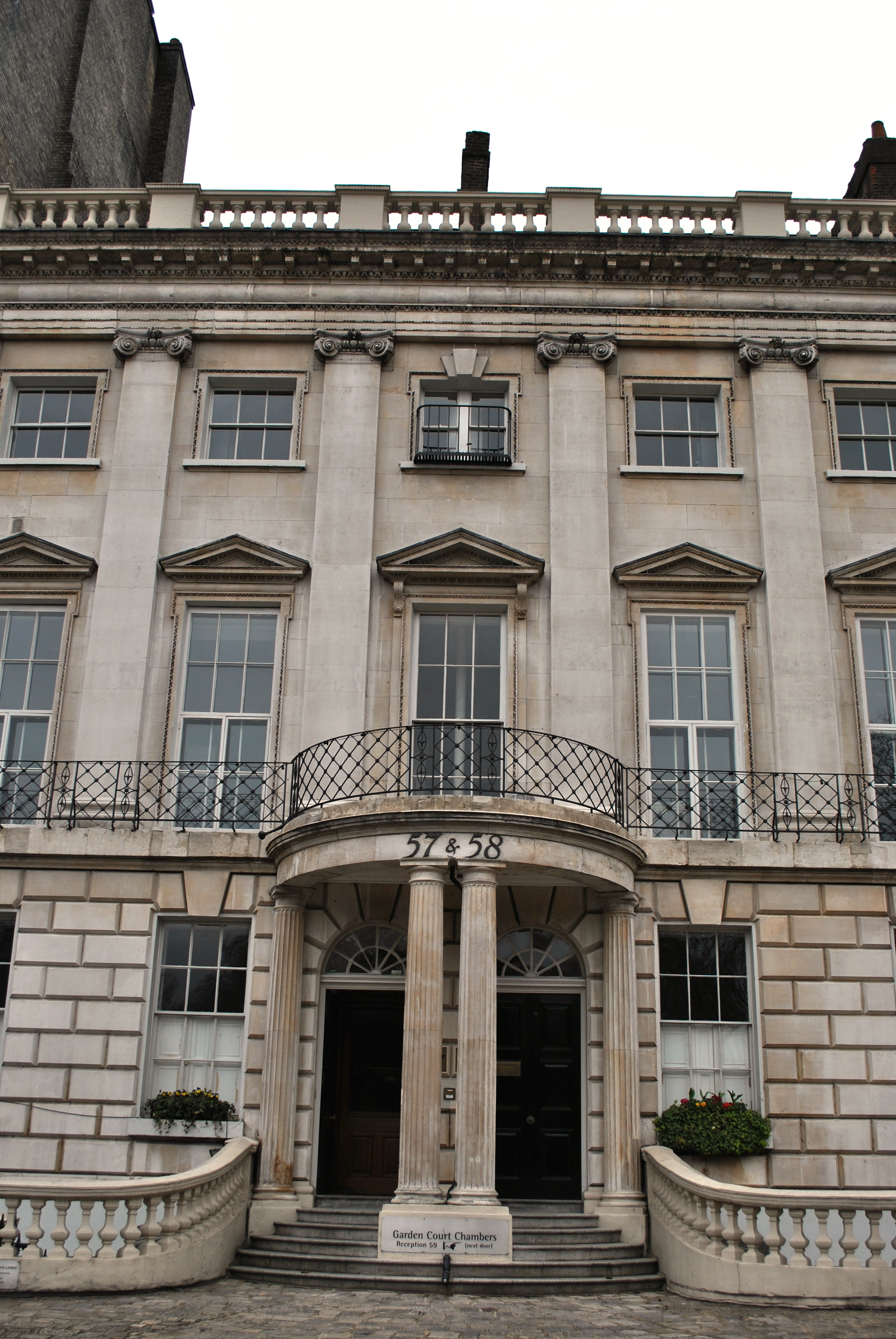
57–58 Lincoln's Inn Fields

In Charles Dickens' novel Bleak House, the sinister solicitor to the aristocracy, Mr Tulkinghorn, has his offices in Lincoln's Inn Fields, and one of its most dramatic scenes is set there. The description of his building corresponds most closely to Lindsey House. After a spell of being occupied by a firm of patent agents, Lindsey House has become home to the leading civil liberties barristers' chambers, Garden Court Chambers, together with the neighbouring building at 57–58, which includes some features designed by Sir John Soane, including a geometric staircase.

The London School of Economics and Political Science moved onto the square in 2003, taking the leasehold of 50 Lincoln's Inn Fields, on the corner of Sardinia Street. At the end of 2008, a new £71 million state-of-the-art building housing the LSE's Departments of Law and Management (54 Lincoln's Inn Fields) was opened by the Queen and the Duke of Edinburgh. Since then it has taken ownership of Sardinia House (2009), the former Land Registry building at 32 Lincoln's Inn Fields (2010), 44 Lincoln's Inn Fields (previously the home of Cancer Research), 5 Lincoln's Inn Fields (2016) and Nuffield House (2017), to expand to seven its portfolio of buildings on the square.

== Notable premises ==
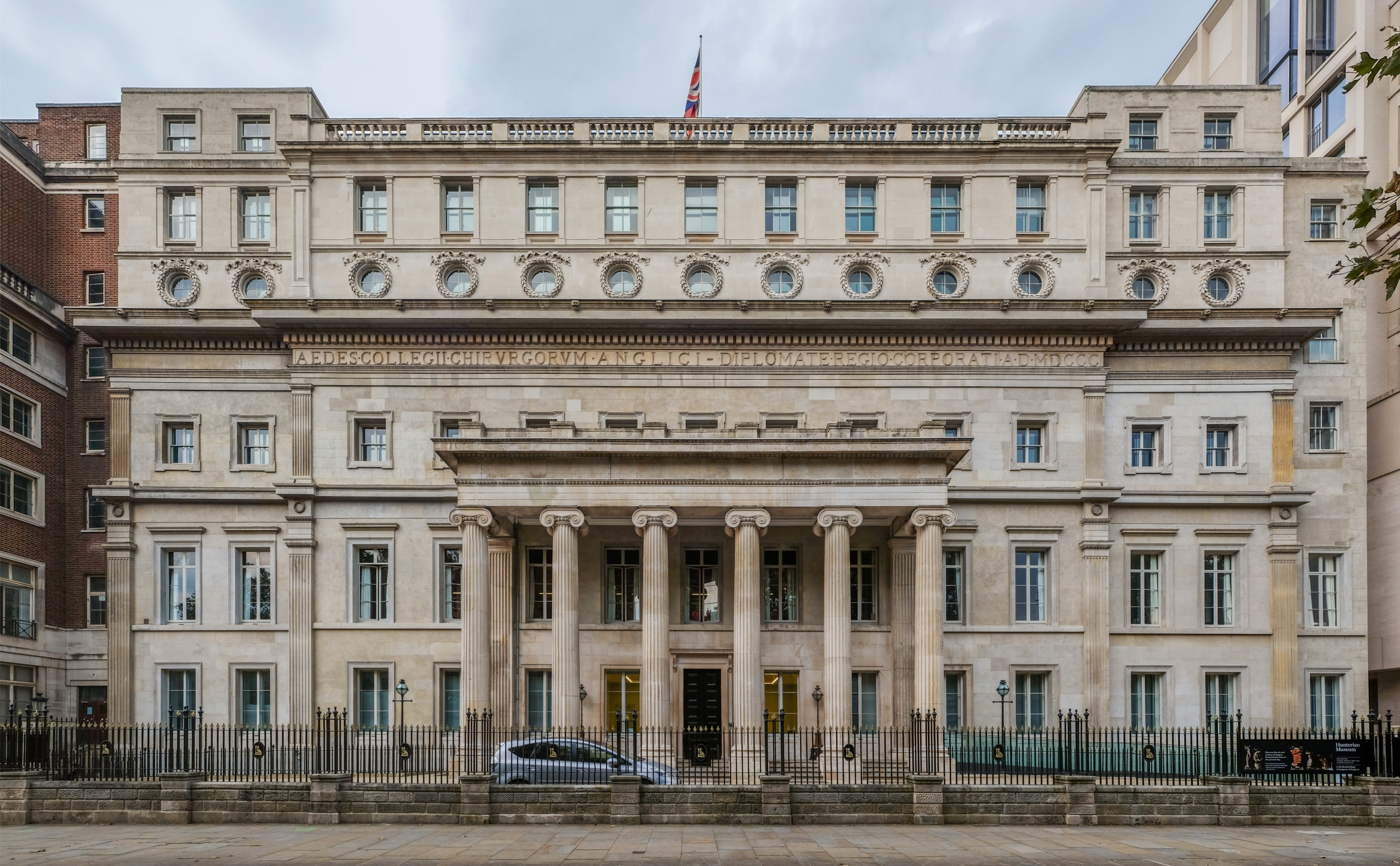
Royal College of Surgeons of England in 38-43 Lincoln's Inn Fields

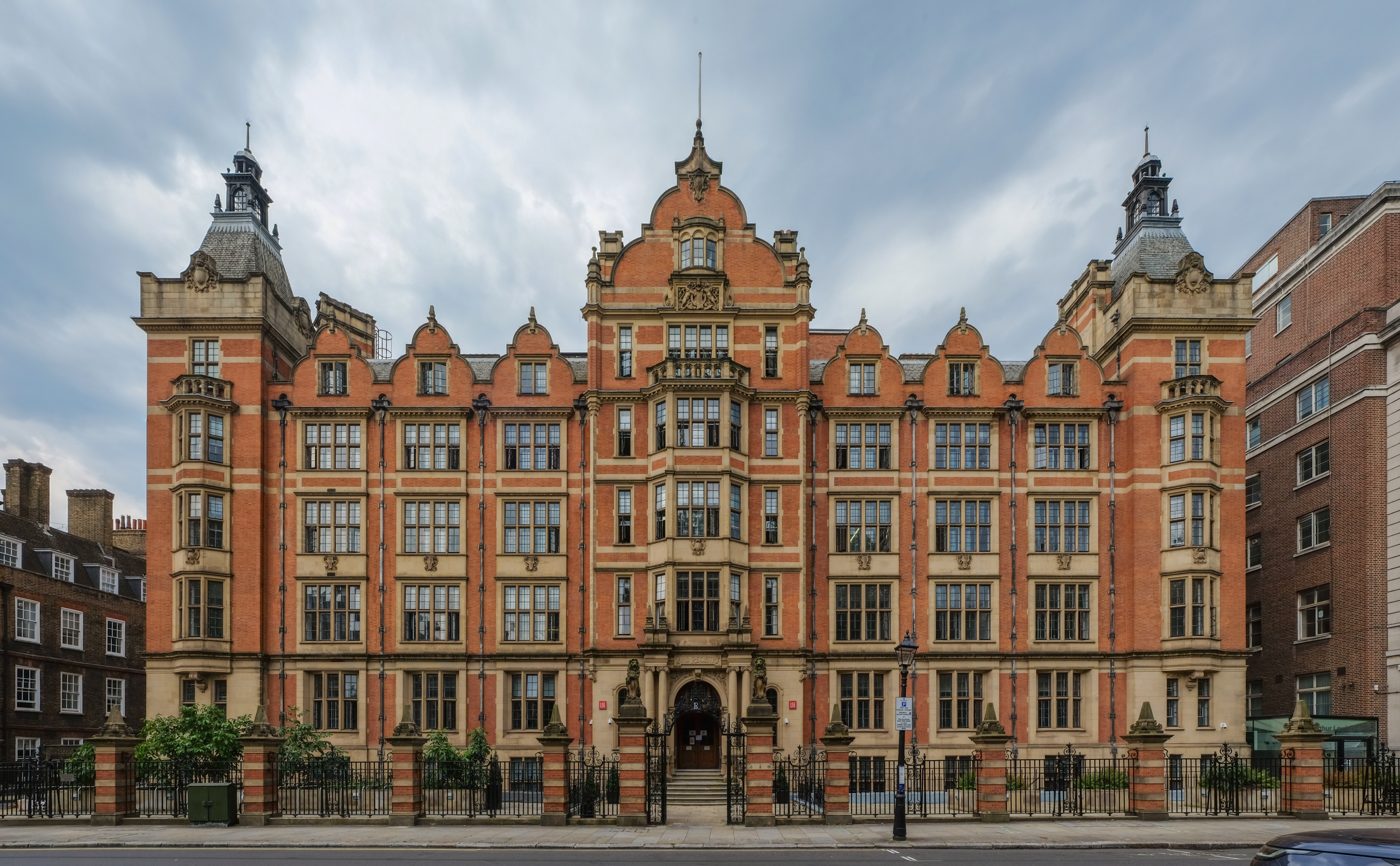
Sir Arthur Lewis Building, formerly Land Registry in 32 Lincoln's Inn Fields

Aside from Lindsey House and Powis House, the north side of the square features Sir John Soane's Museum, home of the architect, at numbers 12, 13 and 14. On the same side, at number 7, is Thomas More Chambers, led by Geoffrey Cox QC MP. Organisations with premises on the south side of the square include the London School of Economics and Political Science (LSE) and the Royal College of Surgeons (including the Hunterian Museum, in which are exhibited the intriguing medical collections of John Hunter). There is a blue plaque marking the home of the surgeon William Marsden at number 65. On the west side the Royal College of Radiologists has premises at 63 Lincoln's Inn Fields, and the London School of Economics and Political Science owns a number of buildings. Aside from the Royal College of Surgeons, the School will then own the entire south side of the square. Also located at 67–69 is the Centre for Commercial Law Studies, the commercial law research and teaching centre of Queen Mary, University of London.

== Artworks and memorials ==
On the north side of the square is the Margaret MacDonald Memorial, a bench with bronze figures by Richard Reginald Goulden. It commemorates the feminist and social reformer Margaret Ethel MacDonald who lived with her husband Ramsay MacDonald at Lincoln's Inn Fields. The memorial is grade II listed.

Another grade II listed memorial, to Frederick Smith, 2nd Viscount Hambleden, is located in the north-east corner of the gardens. The memorial was designed by Edwin Lutyens, and originally had a bust by Arthur George Walker but this was stolen in the 1970s. At the south-east entrance of the gardens is a grade II listed memorial drinking fountain commemorating Philip Twells. The gothic drinking fountain at the opposite north-west entrance is also grade II listed, along with two bespoke Victorian lamp posts moved from Battersea Park in 2009.

The Royal Canadian Air Force headquarters in Britain during World War II was located at 20-23 Lincoln's Inn Fields. A memorial was unveiled and a Canadian maple tree planted nearby in 1998 by the Prime Minister of Canada Jean Chrétien and the Mayor of Camden. This memorial replaced a previous memorial and maple tree that had been planted in 1945 by Holborn Borough Council. The 1998 ceremony included a flyover by Tornado Jets. A bomb shelter constructed in 1940 and used by the RCAF and other residents remains under the fields even though surface markings have been removed.

There is a 1977 bust of John Hunter by Nigel Boonham in the south-west of the gardens, commissioned by the Royal College of Surgeons of England. Camdonian, a 1980 abstract steel sculpture by Barry Flanagan, is located at the north-east entrance of the square.

== Homelessness ==
During the 1980s Lincoln's Inn Fields attracted many homeless people, who slept there overnight. In 1992, they were cleared out and fences were raised, and since the re-opening of Lincoln's Inn Fields with its new railings in 1993, gates have been locked every night at dusk.

During the 2008 Muslim holy month of Ramadan, Muslims attended the Fields at sunset to feed the homeless.

== Nearest stations ==
The nearest London Underground stations are Holborn, Chancery Lane and Temple.
