= Rachel Elfreda Fowler =

English scholar and lecturer (1872–1951)

Rachel Elfreda Fowler (10 December 1872 – 21/22 September 1951) was an English literary scholar and lecturer in art and history at the University of Oxford.

== Early life ==
Rachel Fowler was born in 1872 in Weymouth, Dorset, the youngest daughter of Sir Robert Fowler (1828–1891), member of parliament and Lord Mayor of London, and his wife Sarah Charlotte Fowler, née Fox. Elfreda was one of eleven children. She received her advanced education at Westfield College and then at the University of Oxford where she studied modern languages.

== Career ==
Fowler completed her PhD at the University of Paris in 1905 on the subject of Une Source Française des Poèmes de Gower which discussed the sources for John Gower's poetry.

She worked as a nurse in Paris for two years during the First World War and later lectured in art and history at the University of Oxford.

== Death and legacy ==
Fowler died by suicide in 1951; She was last seen on 21 September and her body was found the next day in Culham, Berkshire. Her papers are held by Queen Mary Archives. She was the subject of a biographical monograph by Genevieve O. Davidson in 1952.

== Selected publications ==
- Une Source Française des Poèmes de Gower. Macon, 1905.
