= John Twells =

- Born: June 27, 1776
- Died: March 10, 1866 (aged 89)
- Occupation: Banker
- Spouse: Mary Line
- Children: 2

John Twells (1776–1866) was an English banker who was partner in private bank Spooner, Attwood & Co and deputy chairman of the London & Greenwich Railway.

== Life ==
He was born on 27 June 1776. On his own account, he went into banking in 1801. He became a partner in the private bank Spooner, Attwood & Co. of Gracechurch Street, London, around 1816 together with Isaac Spooner.

Twells was the initial deputy chairman of the London & Greenwich Railway in 1834, resigning in 1837. He gave evidence to the 1857 Parliamentary Select Committee on the working of the Bank Charter Act 1844. He approved of the Bank Restriction Act 1797. On early colonial scrip, Twells commented that

"In a bad hour, the British Parliament took away from America its representative money [...]"

Karl Marx picked up on his comment that the 1844 Act had been profitable for bankers, while disadvantaging merchants and those in business in a small way.

Twells died on 10 March 1866. How can paper money increase the wealth of a nation? (1867, anonymous) was by his son John.

== Family and connections ==
Twells married Mary Line, daughter of Joseph Line of Alum Rock, Worcestershire, and they had two sons, the Rev. John Twells and Philip Twells M.P. Matthias Attwood M.P. was a connection in the London & Greenwich, where he was treasurer, and in the bank. He was also a connection by marriage, having married Susanna Twells, daughter of Twells's brother William.

Twells & Co., the Birmingham manufacturers, proprietor Philip M. Twells, were related. They supplied a locomotive to the London & Greenwich, No. 8 Thames, in 1838, thought to be a one-off. It has been suggested that they acted only as agents. Philip Mellor Twells was a Birmingham brass and copper tube manufacturer. Edward Twells was son of Philip Mellor Twells of Ashted.
