= William Cotton (Conservative politician) =

English merchant and Conservative politician

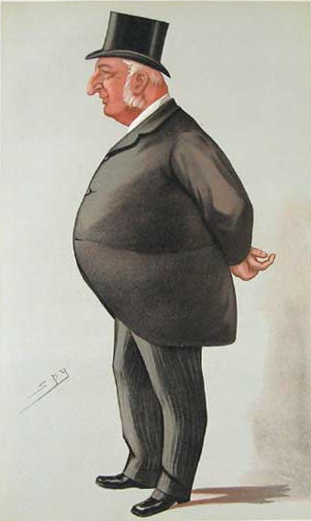
"the City" Cotton as caricatured by Spy (Leslie Ward) in Vanity Fair, September 1885

Sir William James Richmond Cotton (13 November 1822 – 4 June 1902) was an English merchant and Conservative Party politician who sat in the House of Commons from 1874 to 1885.

== Life ==
Cotton was born at Stratford, London, the son of William Cotton and his wife Caroline Richmond. He became a London merchant and owned iron mines in Norway as well as the Sun and Topping wharves at London Bridge. He was a commissioner of the Inland Revenue and a director of the Liverpool and London Globe Fire and Life Assurance Co. He was a J.P. for Middlesex, Hertfordshire and the City of London. Cotton was a member of the Haberdashers Company, the Saddlers Company the Turners Company and the Fan Makers Company, and filled the mastership of the three first-named. He was a trustee of St Andrew Undershaft, chairman of the Mary Datchelor Girls' School governors, a governor of Queen Anne's Bounty, a governor of the Royal Hospitals, a member of the committee of Aske's Charity and president of the City of London Rifle Corps.

Cotton was elected an alderman for the city (Lime street Ward) in 1866, and served as such until 1892. He was Sheriff of London and Middlesex from 1868 to 1869, and Lord Mayor of London from 1875 to 1876, during which years he opened the new poultry and provisions market at Smithfield and presided over a grand banquet welcoming the Prince of Wales on his return from a tour of India. In 1868 he had stood for parliament unsuccessfully at Southwark. At the 1874 general election he was elected Member of Parliament for City of London. He lost his seat in parliament in the 1885 UK general election after representation was reduced from four to two under the Redistribution of Seats Act 1885, and bitter at this result never attempted to re-enter.

Cotton was a member of the London School Board for nine years and became its chairman, and was also chairman of the Police Committee for seventeen years. He became Chamberlain of the City of London in 1892, and was knighted in July 1892.

He published a volume of poems called Imagination.

Cotton died at his residence in London on 4 June 1902, at the age of 79. He is buried in the churchyard of St Mary the Virgin, East Barnet, near London.

== Family ==
Cotton married, in October 1846, Caroline Richmond Pottinger. Lady Cotton died on 18 March 1901. They had 12 children, of whom seven survived their parents.

Parliament of the United Kingdom
| Preceded by Robert Wigram Crawford; John Hubbard; George Goschen; William Lawrence | Member of Parliament for the City of London; 1874 – 1885; With: John Hubbard 1874–87; Philip Twells 1874–80; George Goschen to 1880; William Lawrence 1880–85; Sir Robert Fowler, Bt 1880–91 | Succeeded by John Hubbard; Sir Robert Fowler, Bt |
Civic offices
| Preceded by Sir William McArthur; David Henry Stone | Sheriffs of the City of London; 1867–1868; With: Charles William Cookworthy Hutton | Succeeded by Sir Joseph Causation; Sir James Vallentin |
| Preceded by David Henry Stone | Lord Mayor of the City of London; 1875–1876 | Succeeded by Sir Thomas White |
| Preceded by Benjamin Scott | Chamberlain of the City of London; 1892–1902 | Succeeded by Sir Joseph Dimsdale |
