= Charles Bell (British politician) =

British Conservative Party politician

Charles Bell MP

Member of Parliament for City of London
- In office 16 November 1868 – 9 February 1869 Serving with Robert Wigram Crawford, George Goschen, and William Lawrence
- Preceded by: Robert Wigram Crawford; Lionel de Rothschild; George Goschen; William Lawrence
- Succeeded by: Robert Wigram Crawford; Lionel de Rothschild; George Goschen; William Lawrence

Personal details
- Born: 1805
- Died: 9 February 1869 (aged 63)
- Party: Conservative

Charles Bell (1805 – 9 February 1869) was a British Conservative Party politician.

He was elected MP for City of London in November 1868 but died just four months later in February 1869.

Parliament of the United Kingdom
Preceded by Robert Wigram Crawford; Lionel de Rothschild; George Goschen; William Lawrence	Member of Parliament for City of London; 1868–1869; With: Robert Wigram Crawford; George Goschen; William Lawrence	Succeeded by Robert Wigram Crawford; Lionel de Rothschild; George Goschen; William Lawrence
