= William Lucas Sargant =

William Lucas Sargant (1809–1889) was an English educational reformer and political economist.

== Life ==
Sargant was born 2 Oct 1809 at King's Norton, Worcestershire the son of William and Elizabeth Sargant; his father was in trade in Edmund Street and Whittall Street, Birmingham, as a maker of military arms and other equipment for the triangular trade. He was educated at Hazelwood School, Edgbaston, run by Thomas Wright Hill. He then entered Trinity College, Cambridge, but left within two years to work in his father's business.

Sargant married first at Edgbaston, Warwickshire, England on 11 Nov 1835, Maria Redfern, by whom he fathered: 1. Maria (m 1862 Arent de Peyster Chance), 2. William, 3. Emily Martha, and 4. Laura) and second at St. Andrew's, Clifton, Gloucestershire, England on 14 Apr 1855, Theodosia Nash (1826 – 1914), by whom he fathered: 5. Francis Lucas (1856 – 1937), 6. George Herbert (1859 – 1947), 7.Elizabeth Maud (1861 – 1944), 8. Arthur Edgar (1864 – 1934), and 9. Mary Theodosia (1867 – 1903).

Sargant took part in local affairs in Birmingham, becoming a J.P. in 1849, serving on the town council, and as a reorganising governor of King Edward's School, Birmingham. In 1857 he associated himself with an educational prize scheme for aiding promising scholars at elementary schools; and in 1870 he helped to promote the National Association League, of which he became chairman. As a churchman he advocated religious teaching in elementary schools, and found himself strongly opposed by a minority of the members of the League; but he held his own in a long struggle.

In 1879 Sargant retired from business, and he died at Birmingham on 2 November 1889.

== Works ==
Sargant's main publications were:

- The Science of Social Opulence, 1856.
- Economy of the Labouring Classes, 1857.
- Social Innovators and their Schemes, 1858.
- Robert Owen, and his Social Philosophy, 1860.
- Recent Political Economy, 1867.
- Apology for Sinking Funds, 1868.
- Essays by a Birmingham Manufacturer, 4 vols. 1869–72.
- Taxation: Past, Present, and Future, 1874.
- Inductive Political Economy, vol. i. 1887.

He also contributed to the proceedings of the Statistical Society.

== Notes ==
Attribution

This article incorporates text from a publication now in the public domain: Lee, Sidney, ed. (1897). "Sargant, William Lucas". Dictionary of National Biography. Vol. 50. London: Smith, Elder & Co.
