= Gastard =

Village in Wiltshire, England

Coordinates: 51.416°N 02.168°W

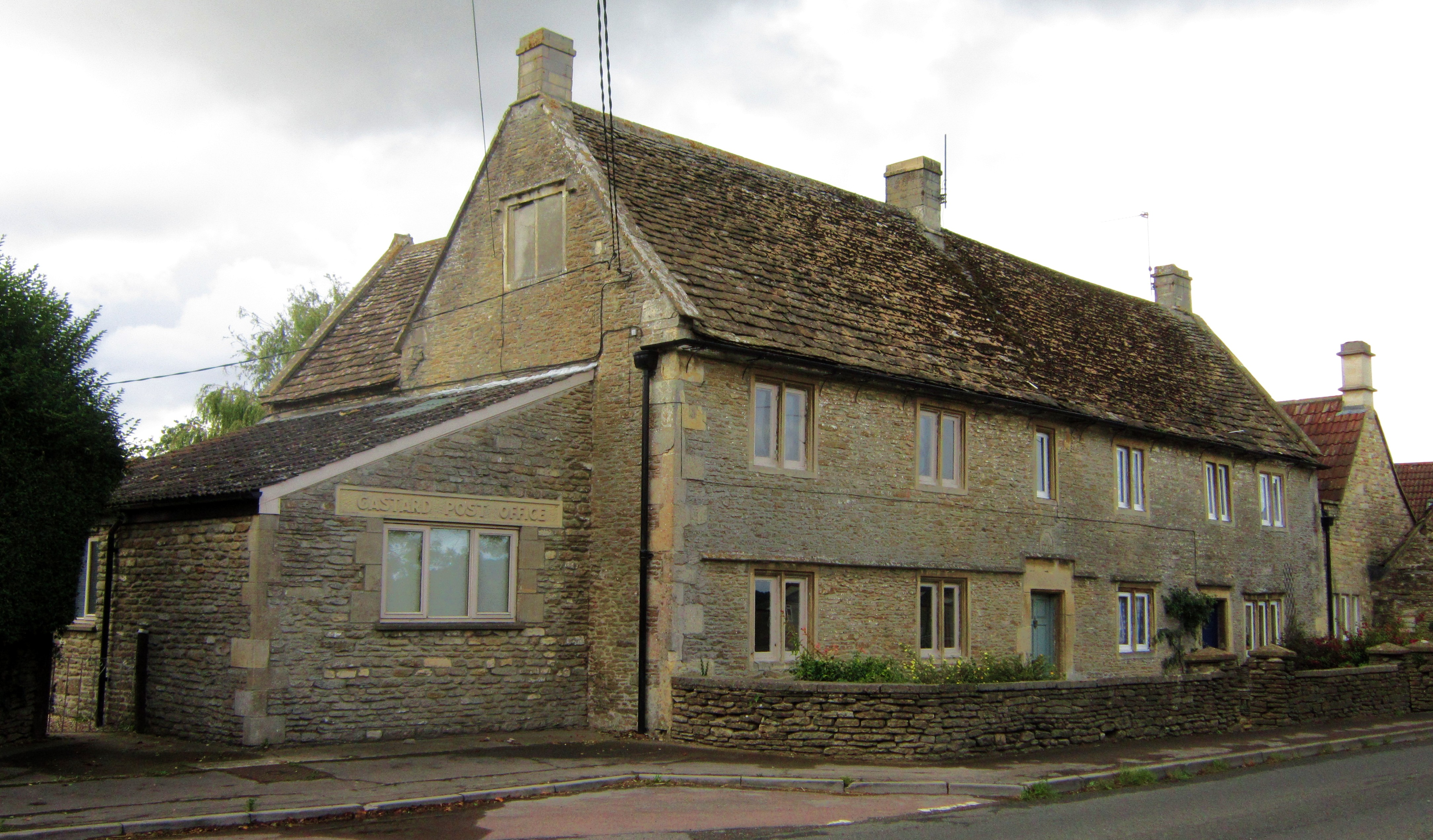
- Former post office, Gastard

- Location within Wiltshire
- Population: 435
- OS grid reference: ST883685
- Civil parish: Corsham
- Unitary authority: Wiltshire
- Ceremonial county: Wiltshire
- Region: South West
- Country: England
- Sovereign state: United Kingdom
- Post town: Corsham
- Postcode district: SN13
- Dialling code: 01249
- Police: Wiltshire
- Fire: Dorset and Wiltshire
- Ambulance: South Western
- UK Parliament: Chippenham

Gastard is a village in Wiltshire, England, four miles south west of Chippenham, part of the civil parish of the nearby town of Corsham.

The village has a pub called the Harp and Crown.

== History and church ==
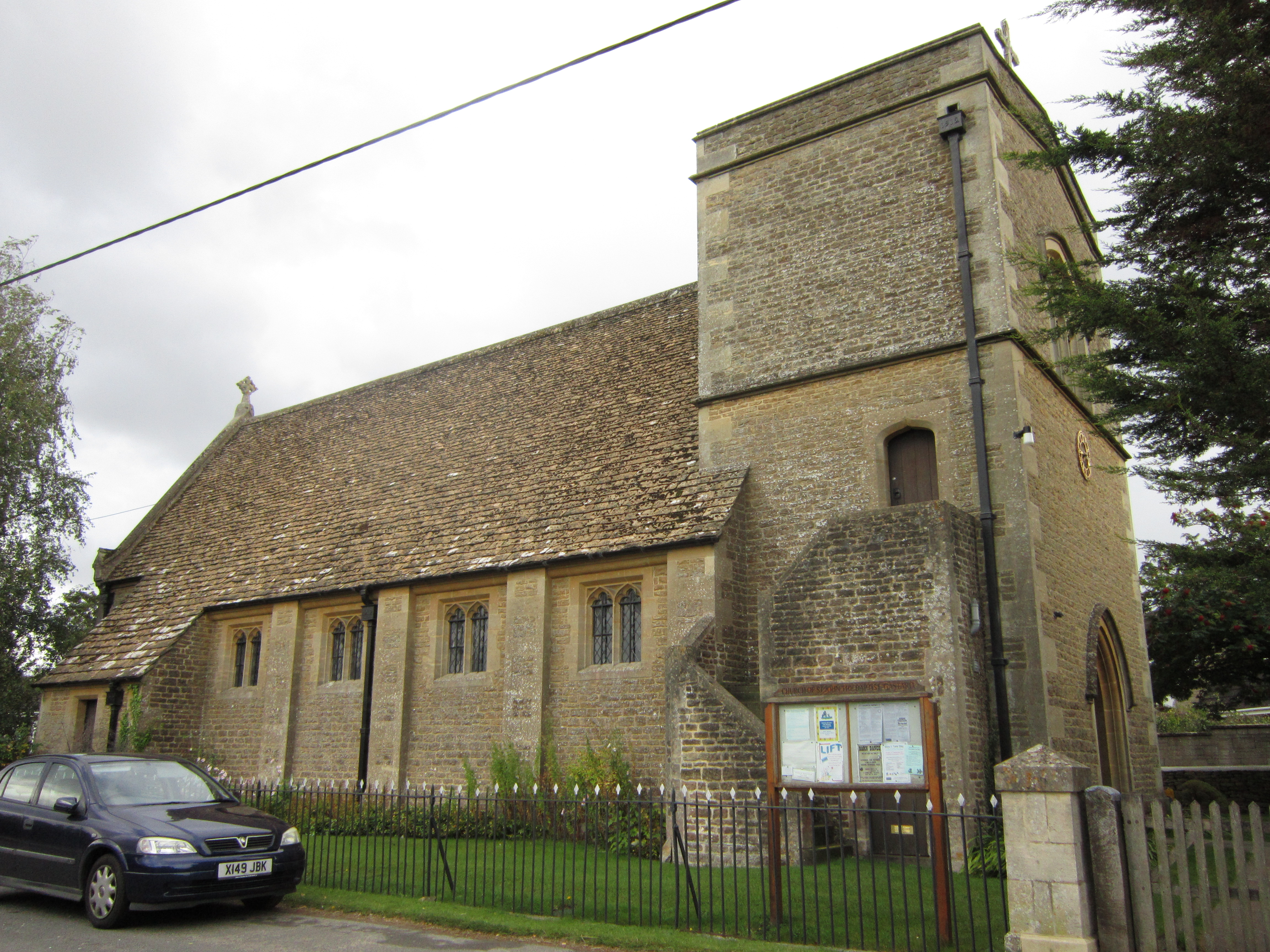
Parish church of St John the Baptist

Remains of an early field system at Gastard are believed to date from the Romano-British period, and Roman jewellery has been found.

The name of the village has had several different forms over the centuries and was recorded variously as Gatesterta in 1154, Getestert in 1167, Gateherst in 1177, Gastard in 1428. In 1875 it was referred to in a directory as "Gastard (or Gustard)".

Gastard Court is a medieval manor house with 17th-century mullioned windows and buttresses.

Bath Freestone was mined at the Monk Quarry on Monk Lane, Gastard, where Forest Marble can also be seen exposed.

For Church of England purposes, Gastard is an ecclesiastical parish and has its own parish church dedicated to St John the Baptist. Located on Lanes End, Gastard (approx. postcode SN13 9QS), the Church was built in 1912 on a field called 'Home Orchard' donated by Miss Jean Fowler of Gastard House and constructed (through her generosity) as a memorial to her father, Sir Robert N Fowler, Bt, and her brother, Sir Thomas Fowler, Bt, who had been killed in 1902 during the second Boer War. The Church possibly acquired its dedication from a former chapel at the top of Velley Hill, Gastard, known as the chapel of St John the Baptist, for which some historical record can be traced to the 14thC. The Church was dedicated on St John's Day, 24 June 1913.

Built between 1912-13 to the architectural designs of Captain Edmond Warre, is it in a free perpendicular style with a broad shallow gabled tower of 36 feet height, with a small bell turret. Capt.Warre (1877-1961), known as 'Bear', was son of Edmond Ware (1837-1920), headmaster and Provost of Eton College, and educated at Eton and Balliol College, Oxford. He served in WWI as a Captain in the King's Royal Rifle Corps and subsequently in the RAF. Contemporary reports list him as a 'well-known' architect, working as the architect at Eton from about 1911. He was responsible for works to Wilton House, converting the Wyatt Library into a drawing room in 1913.

The Church, Grade II listed, has a nave of 36 feet long by 22 feet wide supported by piers of dressed Bath stone forming two arches at the west end, there is an oak gallery in a 17th C style. Originally intended for choir and organ, the instrument installed in 1962 (at the chancel steps) to mark 50 years of the parish came from St Bede's Church, Fishponds (which had closed that year). St John's, along with Ss Philip and James, Neston, was absorbed into the Team Ministry of Greater Corsham in 1979, being designated in 1985 as its own Parish Church within the united benefice of Greater Corsham and Lacock. The church still has a morning service every Sunday.

In 1967, the village experienced a freak hailstorm, with some of the hailstones of nearly three inches in diameter.

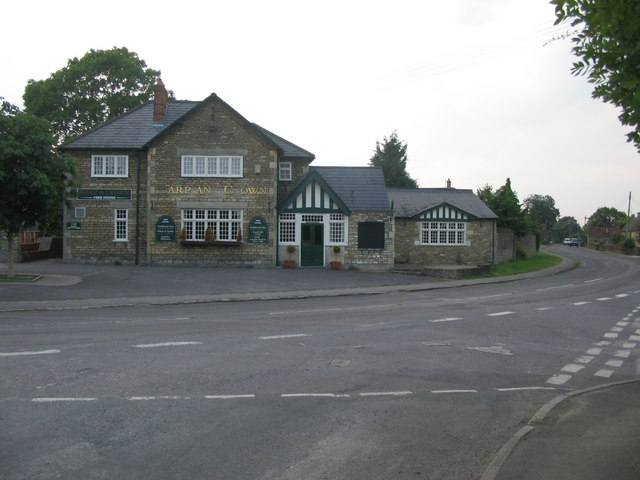
The "Harp and Crown" public house in June 2006

== Governance ==
Most significant local government functions are carried out by the Wiltshire Council unitary authority; until April 2009, Gastard was part of the district of North Wiltshire. At the parliamentary level, the village is part of the Chippenham borough constituency.

== Notable people ==
- Luce de Gast
- Sir Robert Fowler, 1st Baronet

== Bibliography ==
- Bob Hayward, Where the Ladbrook flows: memories of village boyhood in Gastard, Wiltshire (1983, ISBN 978-0-9508625-2-1)
