= Philip Twells =

British Conservative politician

Philip Twells MP
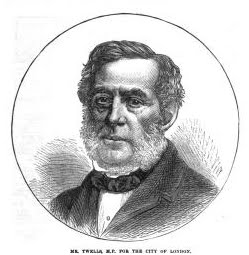

Member of Parliament for City of London
- In office 31 January 1874 – 31 March 1880 Serving with George Goschen; William Cotton; John Hubbard
- Preceded by: Robert Wigram Crawford; Lionel de Rothschild; George Goschen; William Lawrence
- Succeeded by: William Cotton; John Hubbard; Robert Fowler; William Lawrence

Personal details
- Born: 1808
- Died: 8 May 1880 (aged 71)
- Party: Conservative

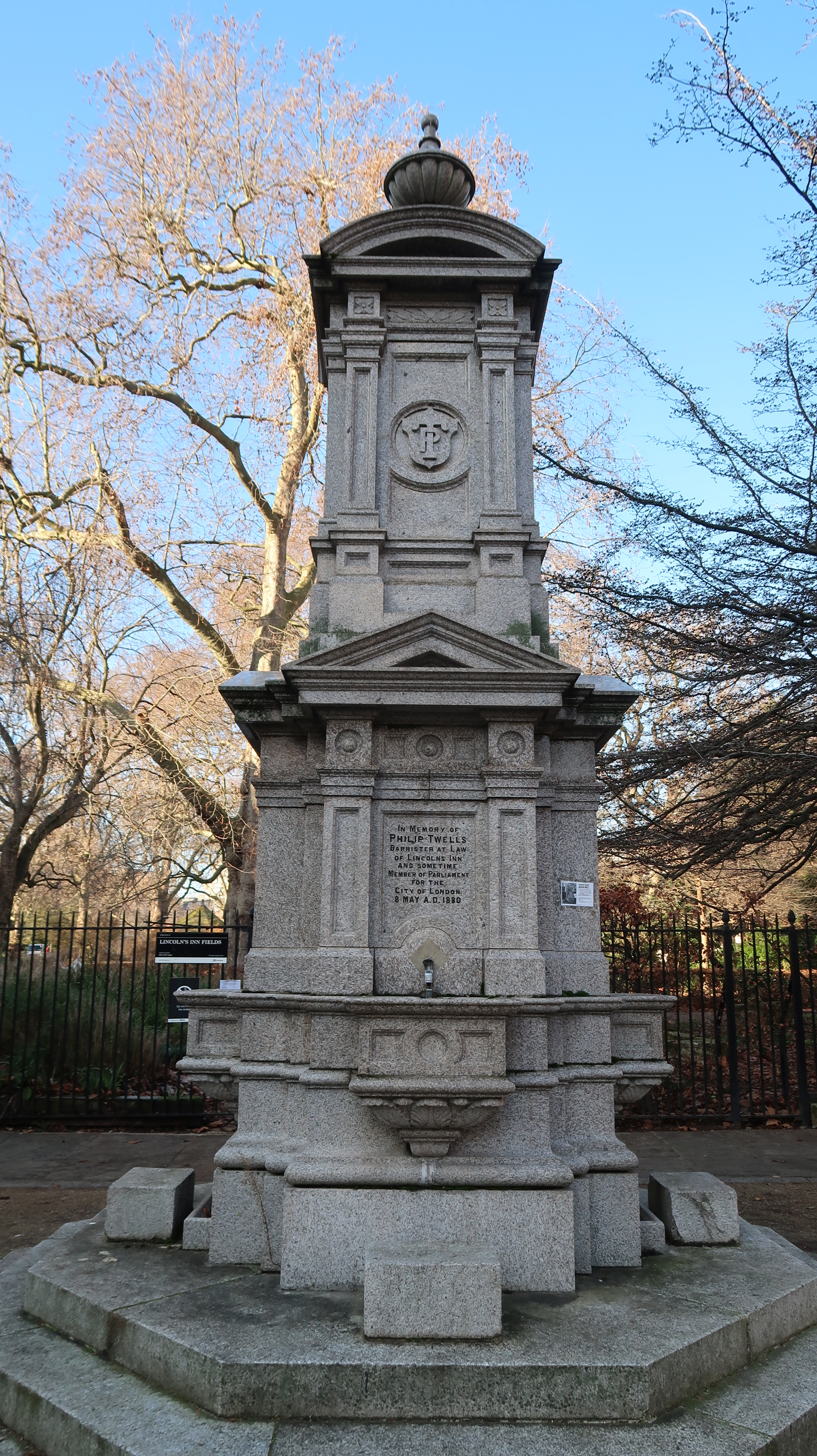
Memorial fountain in Lincoln's Inn Fields, London

Philip Twells (1808 – 8 May 1880) was a Conservative Party politician.

== Life ==
He was the second son of John Twells and his wife Mary Line. He attended Charterhouse School, and matriculated in 1827 at Worcester College, Oxford, graduating B.A. in 1831, M.A. in 1833. He was a banker, and was called to the bar at Lincoln's Inn in 1834.

The family bank, set up by Matthias Attwood, traded as Spooner, Attwoods and Co. of Lombard Street. In 1863, the private bank Barclay, Bevan, Tritton and Co., precursor to the Barclay Group, took it over. At that point Twells became a partner in the enlarged concern.

Twells first stood for election for City of London in 1868 but was unsuccessful. He was then elected for the constituency in 1874 but did not stand for re-election in 1880.

== Legacy ==
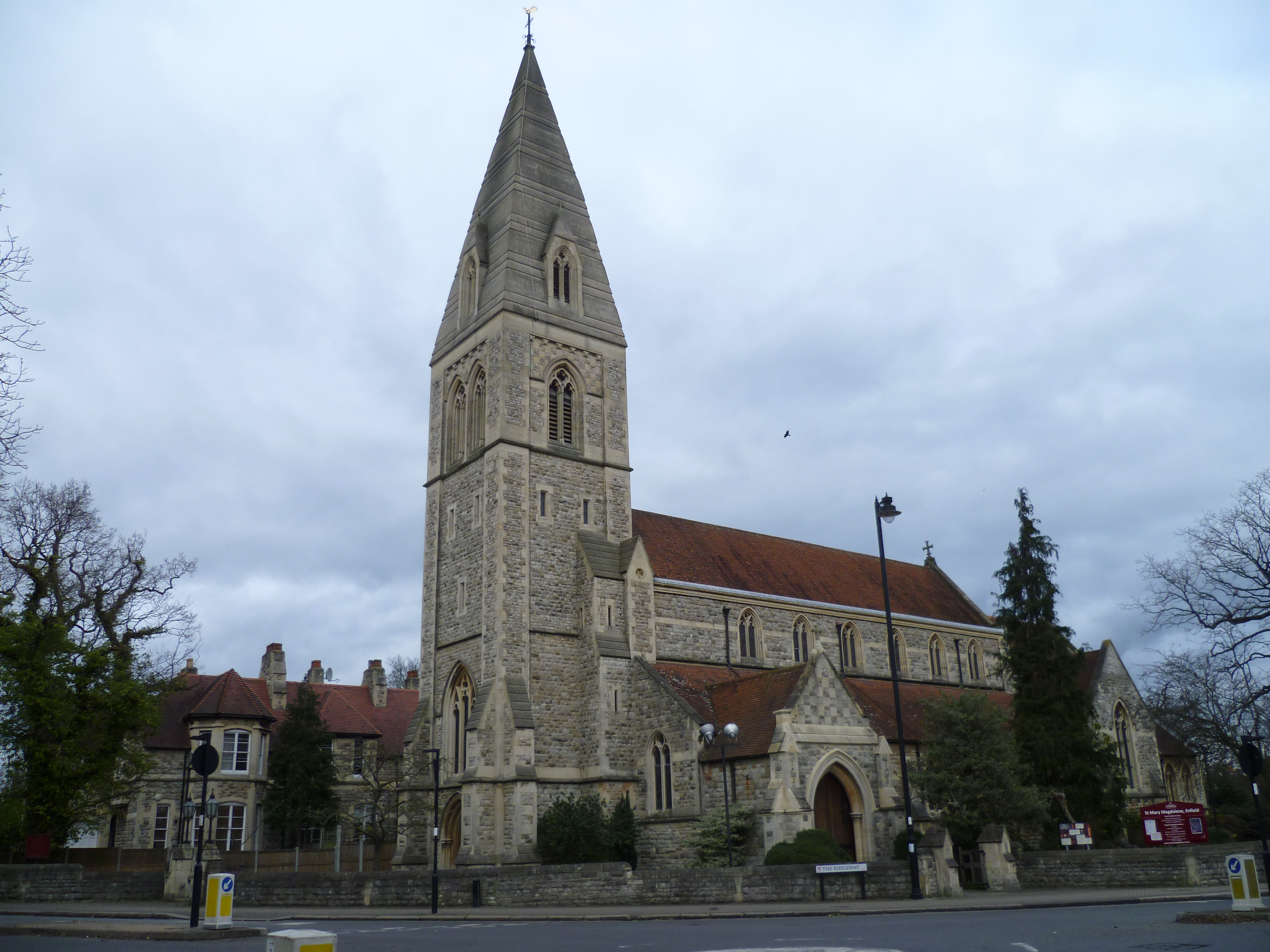
St Mary Magdalene, Enfield today

Twells died leaving £300,000. His widow Georgiana had the church of St Mary Magdalene, Enfield, built in his memory. It was designed by William Butterfield, and finished in 1883.

A memorial fountain was dedicated to him by Georgiana that sits on the south-east corner of Lincoln's Inn Fields.

Parliament of the United Kingdom
Preceded by Robert Wigram Crawford; Lionel de Rothschild; George Goschen; William Lawrence	Member of Parliament for City of London; 1874–1880; With: George Goschen; William Cotton; John Hubbard	Succeeded by William Cotton; John Hubbard; Robert Fowler; William Lawrence
