= Sir Robert Fowler, 1st Baronet =

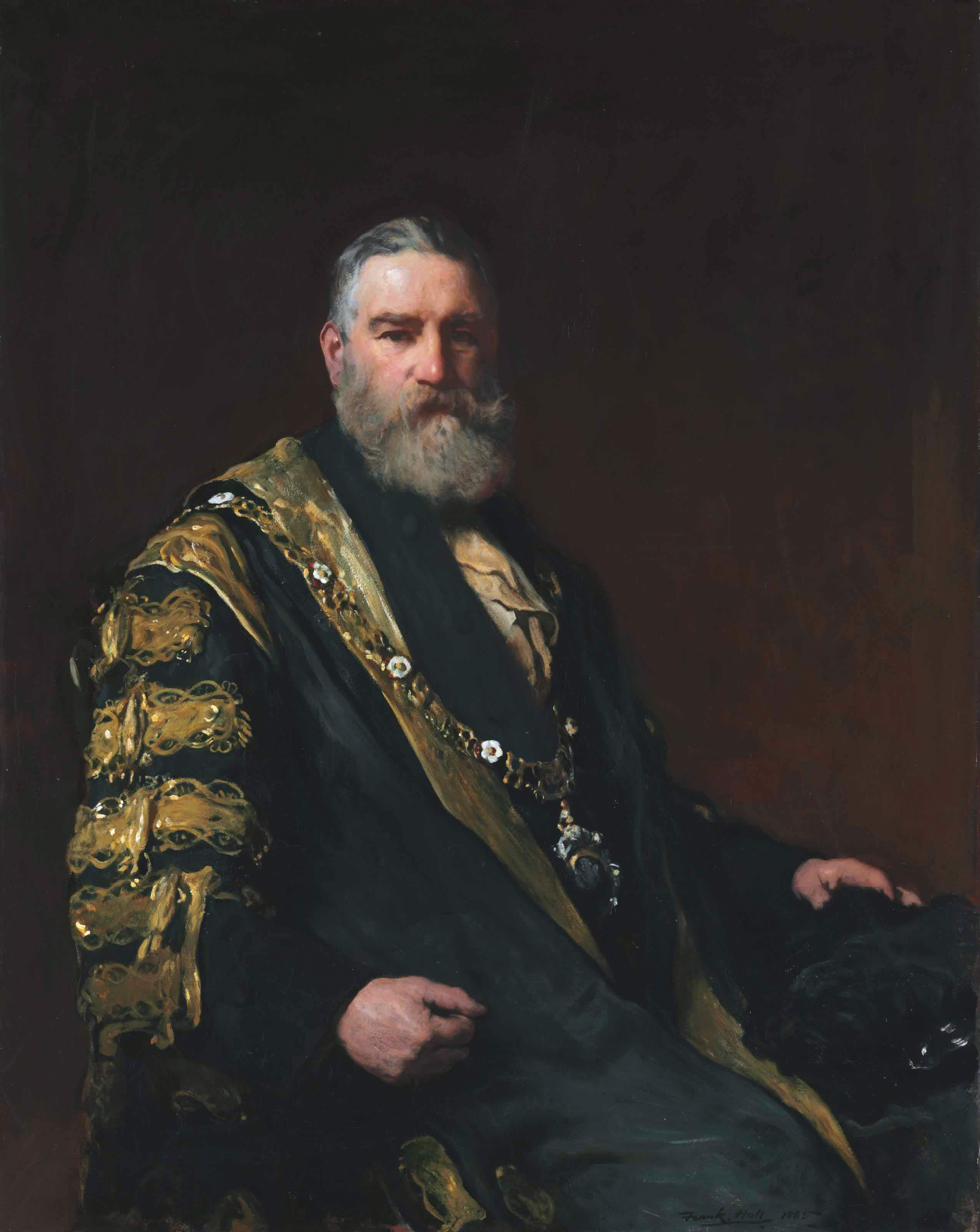
Robert Nicholas Fowler, 1st Bt (Frank Holl, 1885)

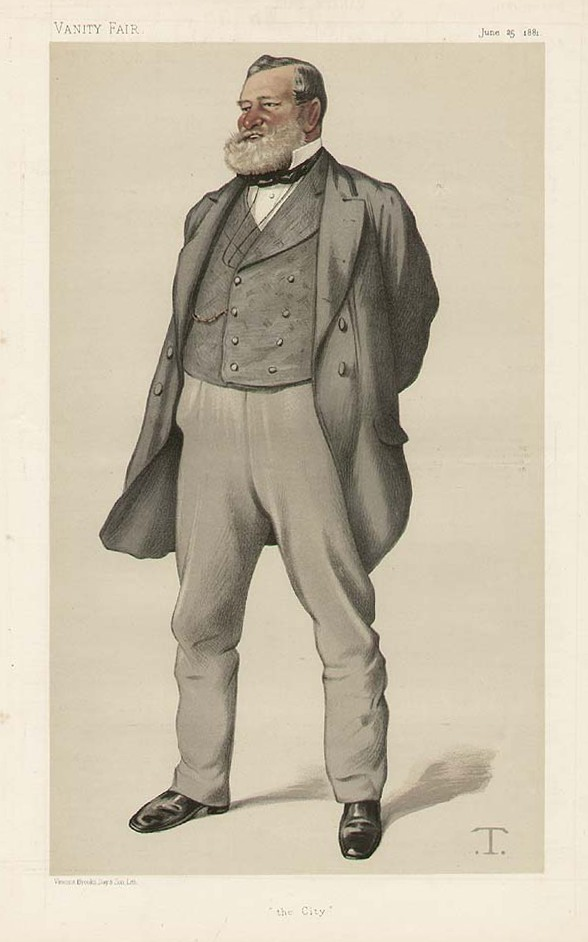
"The City" Fowler as caricatured by Théobald Chartran in Vanity Fair, June 1881

Sir Robert Nicholas Fowler, 1st Baronet DL JP (12 September 1828, Tottenham, Middlesex – 22 May 1891 Harley Street, London) was a member of parliament and Lord Mayor of London.

He was born the son of Thomas Fowler of Gastard, Wiltshire. He attended Grove House School, Tottenham and London University where he was awarded a B.A. degree in 1848.

He was a banker and M.P. for the Penryn and Falmouth Constituency, (1868–1874) and Conservative M.P. for the City of London Constituency (1880–1891). He was also elected Sheriff of the City of London for 1880 and Lord Mayor of London in 1883 and 1885, the last Lord Mayor to serve multiple terms until Sir William Russell in 2019. He was created a baronet in 1885.

He was the author of A visit to Japan, China and India.

According to Frank Harris, an admittedly unreliable source, Fowler excited the disgust of his fellow guests at a dinner given by William Thackeray Marriott by breaking wind copiously, and being apparently unconscious of giving offence.

George Shaw-Lefevre MP noted that, due to plural voting (whereby property owners could vote both in the constituency where their property lay and that in which they lived), Fowler had no fewer than thirteen votes in different constituencies. At one General Election Fowler managed, energetically, to use all thirteen votes in one day.

In 1890, Fowler was described as "of Gastard, Wilts., a JP and DL for Middlesex and Wilts, an Alderman of London".

== Marriage and family ==
On 27 October 1852, Robert Nicholas Fowler married Sarah Charlotte Fox: she was the daughter of Sarah and Alfred Fox, of Falmouth, born on 15 March 1834.

They had ten daughters and one son:

- Lucy Charlotte Fowler was born on 25 January 1855 in Tottenham and died on 28 March 1897 in London aged 42.
- Charlotte Rachel Fowler was born on 29 October 1856 in Tottenham and died on 19 June 1930 in Balevoulin, Pitlochry aged 73. In 1879, Charlotte married Rev. Robert William Barbour. They had five children.
- Helen Ann Fowler was born on 4 December 1858 in Tottenham, died on 4 November 1910 in Pinchinthorpe aged 51. Helen married Sir Alfred Pease, 2nd Baronet. He was son of Sir Joseph Whitwell Pease 1st Baronet and Mary Fox (her mother's sister), and they were married on 10 February 1880 in Corsham. They had three children.
- Mary Fowler was born on 11 May 1860 in Tottenham and died on 22 December 1921 in Upper Hale, Surrey aged 61.
- Harriet Maria Fowler was born on 22 April 1862 in Tunbridge Wells and died on 1 September 1871 in Chippenham, Wiltshire, aged 9.
- Caroline Fowler was born on 21 June 1863 in Brighton and died on 10 April 1891 in St Mewan, Cornwall aged 27. Caroline married Rev. John Stephen Flynn, on 5 April 1888. They had three children.
- Jean Elizabeth Fowler was born on 11 October 1865 in London and died on 17 April 1944 in Farnham aged 78.
- Octavia Louisa Fowler was born on 9 January 1867 in Chippenham, Wiltshire and died on 30 September 1903 in Northampton aged 36.
- Sir Thomas Fowler Bt. was born on 12 August 1868 in London, Killed in Action on 20 April 1902 in South Africa aged 33, during the last significant action of the Second Boer War. He was buried at Ficksburg. His sister's husband wrote a memoir of his life
- Bertha Sophia Fowler was born 13 January 1871.
- Rachel Elfreda Fowler was born 10 December 1872, died by suicide in September 1951.

Parliament of the United Kingdom
Preceded by Jervoise Smith; Samuel Gurney	Member of Parliament for Penryn & Falmouth; 1868–1874; With: Edward Eastwick	Succeeded by David James Jenkins; Henry Thomas Cole
Preceded by Philip Twells; George Goschen; William Cotton; John Hubbard	Member of Parliament for City of London; 1880 – June 1891; With: William Cotton 1874–1885; John Hubbard 1874–1887; William Lawrence 1880–1885; Thomas Charles Baring 1887 – April 1891; Hucks Gibbs from April 1891	Succeeded by Sir Reginald Hanson, Bt; Hucks Gibbs
Civic offices
Preceded by Sir Henry Knight	Lord Mayor of London; 1883–1884	Succeeded by George Nottage
Preceded by George Nottage	Lord Mayor of London; 1885	Succeeded by Sir John Staples
Baronetage of the United Kingdom
New creation	Baronet of Gastard House; 1885–1891	Succeeded by Thomas Fowler
