= Western Wood (MP) =

British businessman and Liberal politician (1804-1863)

Member of Parliament for the City of London
- In office 1861–1863 Serving with Sir James Duke, Bt; Baron Lionel de Rothschild; Robert Wigram Crawford
- Preceded by: Lord John Russell; Sir James Duke, Bt; Baron Lionel de Rothschild; Robert Wigram Crawford
- Succeeded by: George Goschen; Sir James Duke, Bt; Baron Lionel de Rothschild; Robert Wigram Crawford

Personal details
- Born: 4 January 1804
- Died: 17 May 1863 (aged 59) North Cray, Kent, England
- Party: Liberal
- Spouse: Sara Leititan Morris (m. 1829)
- Parents: Sir Matthew Wood (father); Maria Page (mother)
- Relatives: Western Wood (son); William Wood (brother); John Page Wood (brother); Katharine O'Shea (niece); Evelyn Wood (nephew); Benjamin Wood (uncle)
- Education: Winchester College

Western Wood (4 January 1804 – 17 May 1863) was a British businessman and a Liberal Party politician. He sat in the House of Commons from 1861 to 1863.

He married Sara Leititan Morris on 16 June 1829. One of their sons Western Wood was a Member of the Queensland Legislative Council.

== Family ==
Wood was the fifth child, and third son, of Sir Matthew Wood, 1st Baronet (1768–1843) and his wife Maria née Page. His father had been a Lord Mayor of London, and was a Member of Parliament (MP) for 36 years. His brother William (1801–1881) was a barrister and Liberal MP who was ennobled as Lord Hatherley and became Lord Chancellor; his older brother John (1796–1866) was the father of Katharine O'Shea, whose divorce from her husband and remarriage to Charles Stuart Parnell became a major political scandal in 1890.

== Career ==
Wood was a merchant in the City of London, and a member of the Worshipful Company of Fishmongers, of which he was a warden by 1861.

When the Lord John Russell, the Liberal Member of Parliament (MP) for the City of London, was elevated to the peerage as Earl Russell, Wood was chosen as the Liberal candidate for the resulting by-election.

At the selection meeting in the London Tavern on 18 July, one person favoured inviting the Chancellor of the Exchequer, William Ewart Gladstone, to be their candidate, but the others preferred Wood. He told the meeting that, like his father Sir Matthew and his brother Sir William, he supported the secret ballot. In an election address issued that evening he stated his selection was due "entirely to the favourable recollection of the services of my late father". He said that he had been a reformer since his youth, when those principles were not dominant, and pledged himself to support any measures to extend the franchise, expand education, and to achieve an "equitable adjustment of the vexed question of church-rates". In foreign policy, he pledged to follow the principles of Lord John Russell when Foreign Secretary, and said that while it was Britain's duty to express a "lively sympathy for the efforts of other nations to secure their civil and religious liberty", they should abstain "from all interference with the development of the national will".

He asserted that his own personal interests in the commercial of affairs of the city would ensure that he gave them due attention, and that his experience was that in business matters public and private interests were "identical". Finally, he asked the electors not to vote for him on any grounds other than that his opinions coincided with theirs.

His Conservative opponent was the then Lord Mayor of London, William Cubitt, who had resigned as MP for Andover in order to contest the by-election. The election began as a personal contest between two prominent figures in the City, but developed into a vigorous contest of political principles.

Nominations took place at a hustings in the London Guildhall on 29 July, with polling on 30 July 1861. When the result was formally declared on 31 July, Wood had won with a majority of 506 votes out of a total of 10,988. Cubitt had a significant lead amongst the city's Liverymen, but that was not enough to offset Wood's lead amongst the householders.

Wood died in office less than two years later, on 17 May 1863 aged 59, at his home North Cray place in North Cray, Kent. He had an inflammation of both lungs, accompanied by pleurisy.

Parliament of the United Kingdom
Preceded by Lord John Russell; Sir James Duke, Bt; Baron Lionel de Rothschild; Robert Wigram Crawford	Member of Parliament for the City of London; 1861 – 1863; With: Sir James Duke, Bt; Baron Lionel de Rothschild; Robert Wigram Crawford	Succeeded by George Goschen; Sir James Duke, Bt; Baron Lionel de Rothschild; Robert Wigram Crawford
