= Sir Matthew Wood =

Sir Matthew Wood may refer to

- Sir Matthew Wood, 1st Baronet (1768–1843), English politician, Lord Mayor of London from 1815 to 1817
- Sir Matthew Wood, 4th Baronet (1857–1908), English cricketer

== See also ==
- Matthew Wood (disambiguation)
