= Alfred Lyall =

Alfred Lyall may refer to:

- Alfred Comyn Lyall (1835–1911), British civil servant, literary historian and poet
- Alfred Lyall (traveller) (1796–1865), English philosopher, editor, clergyman and traveller
