= Douglas Freshfield =

British lawyer, mountaineer and author (1845–1934)

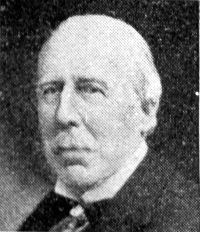
Douglas Freshfield

Douglas William Freshfield (27 April 1845 – 9 February 1934) was a British lawyer, mountaineer and author, who edited the Alpine Journal from 1872 to 1880. He was president of both the Royal Geographical Society and the Alpine Club. He was also the founding president of the Geographical Association. He served from 1897 to 1911, the longest serving president in the history of the Association.

== Early life and education ==
Born in London, Freshfield was the only son of Henry Ray Freshfield and his wife Jane Quinton Crawford. His father was a notable lawyer and member of the family firm of Freshfields. His mother was the daughter of William Crawford, MP for the City of London (1833–1841), who had made a fortune in the East India Company. She was an author and her publications included "Alpine Byways" and "A Tour of the Grisons" (the Swiss Alps now known as Graubünden).

In an interview with Adolfo Hess, Freshfield recalls that his family loved to take long holidays in the summer of up to five weeks. He recalls that when he was six, they visited Lodore Falls in the Lake District, where he was disappointed that the waterfall was slowed due to a sandbank. The following year they travelled to Scotland. In 1854, they travelled to the Swiss Alps, going from Basel to Chamonix. His father attached great importance to preserving open spaces for public enjoyment and was active in campaigns to save Hampstead Heath and Ashdown Forest.

Freshfield was educated at Eton College, and University College, Oxford, where he obtained a degree in civil law and history. He was called to the bar in 1870.

== Mountaineering ==
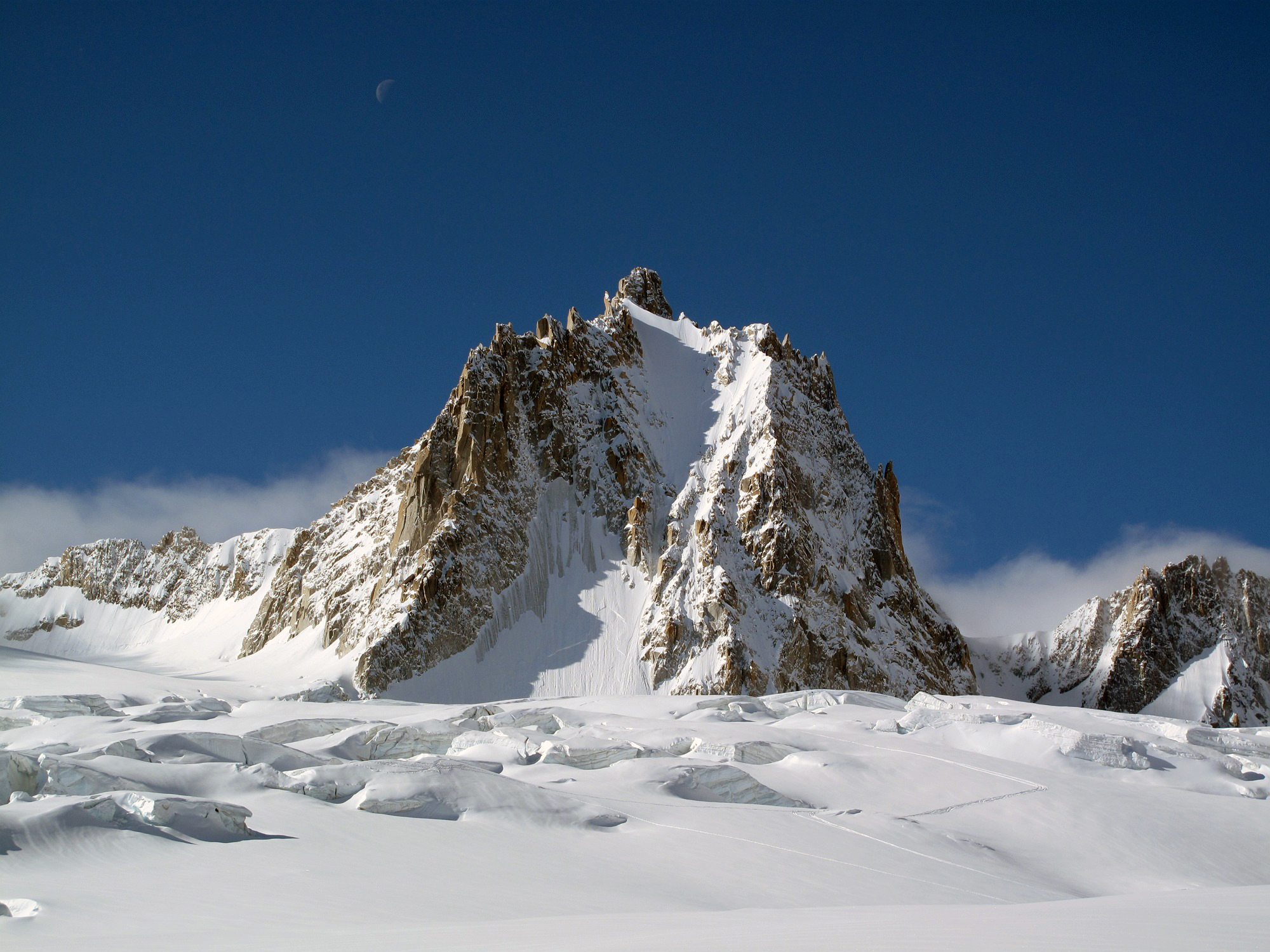
The Tour Ronde on the French/Italian border. First ascent made by Freshfield and five others, July 1867

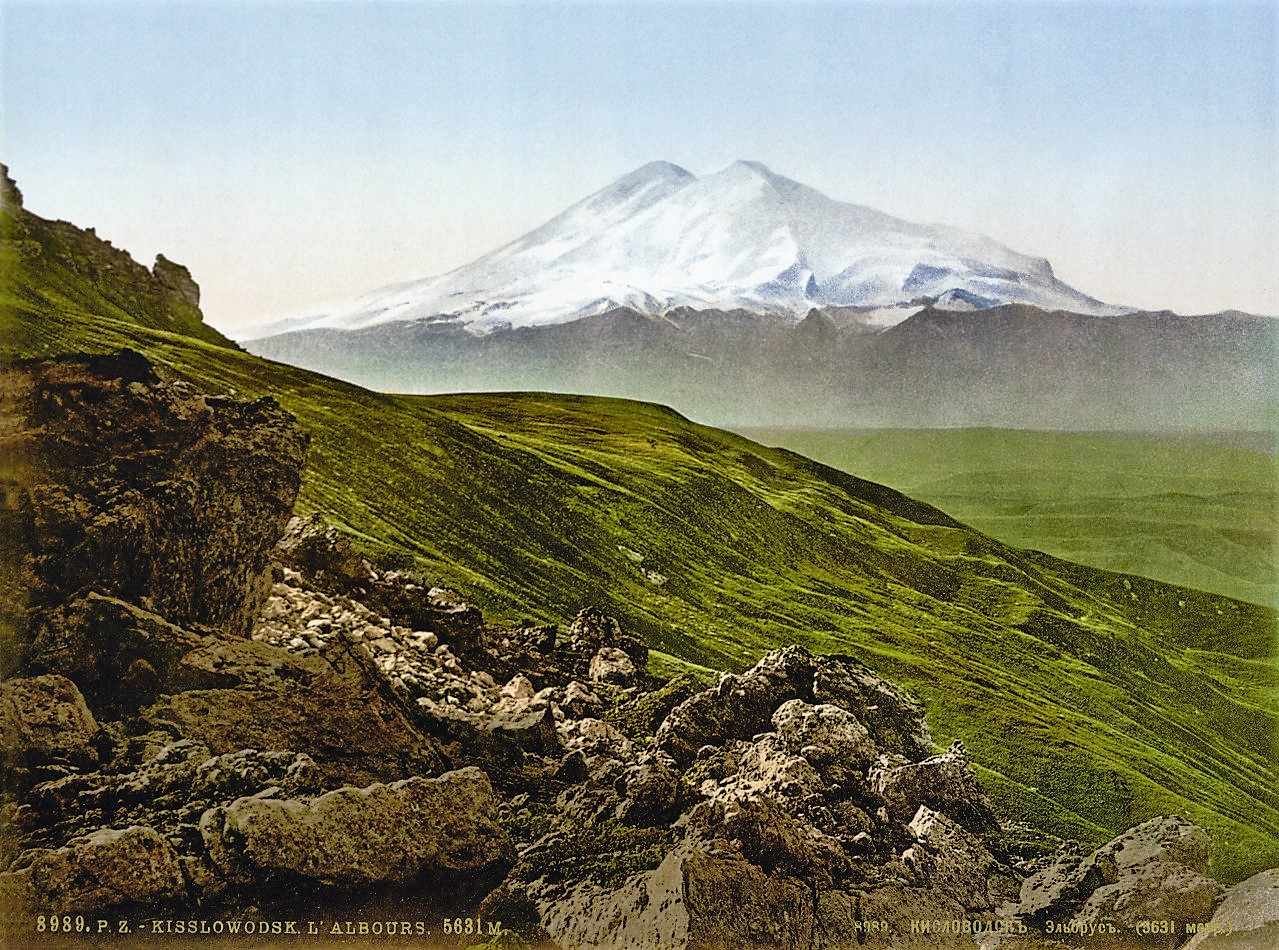
Mount Elbrus.

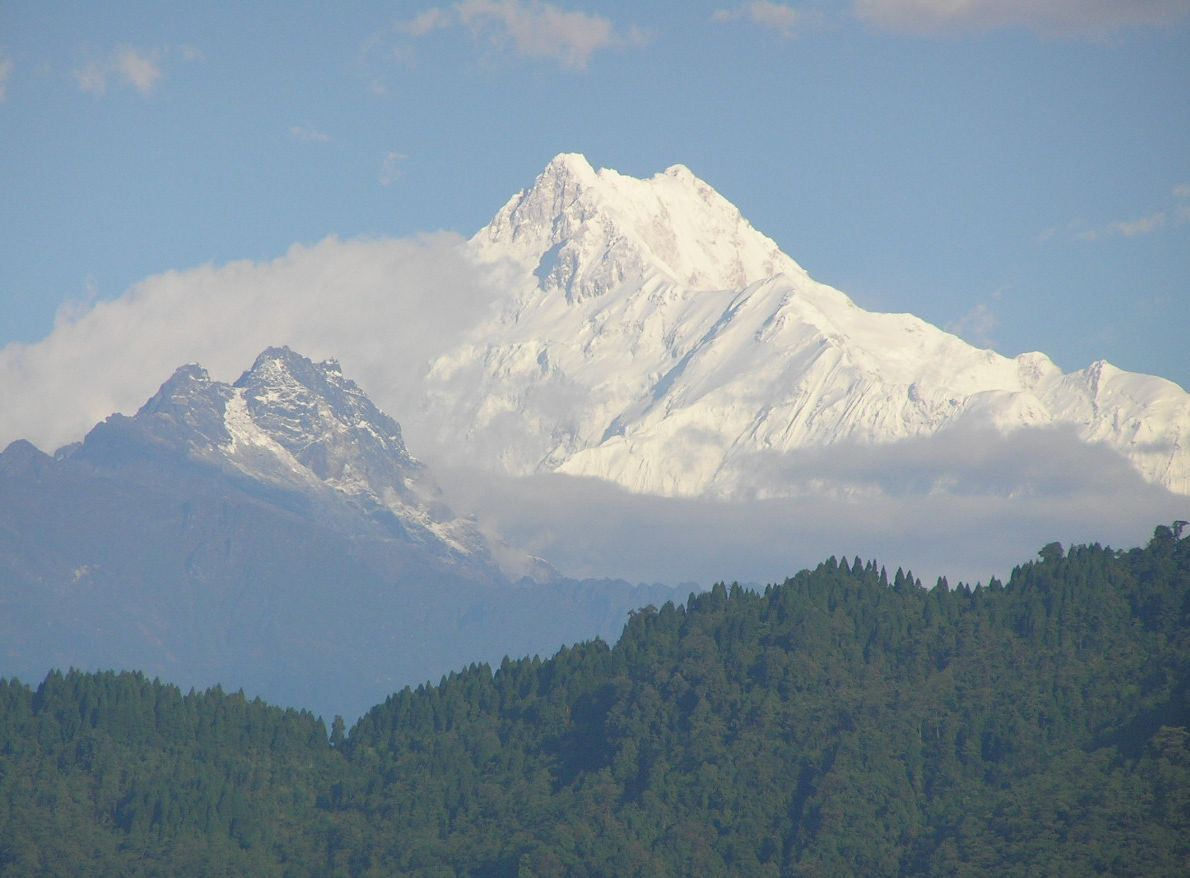
Kangchenjunga early in the morning, from Chouda Pheri.

Freshfield was a keen traveller and mountaineer. From his childhood acquired a deep love of the mountains and was particularly fond of the Alps. In July 1867 he made the first ascent of the Tour Ronde and the col on its eastern side now bears the name 'Col Freshfield'.

By his twenties, Freshfield was already venturing further afield. In 1868 he made an attempt on Elbrus with his Balkarian guide Akhia Sottaev, and although they failed to reach the higher Western summit, Freshfield was the first foreigner to reach the Eastern Summit.

Freshfield led an exploration of the Caucasus and was the first man, officially, to conquer Kazbek with guides from the village Gergeti. He described the denuded territories of Abkhazia in a moving chapter on 'The Solitude of Abkhazia', in The Exploration of the Caucasus published in 1896.

In 1899 Douglas Freshfield travelled to Green Lakes accompanied by the Italian photographer Vittorio Sella. He conducted expeditions around Kangchenjunga (Khangchendzonga) and set out with his party to trek in a circle around Kangchenjunga from the North. When he arrived safely in at Dzongri, he lit a big bonfire, which could be seen from Darjeeling and the Governor of Bengal ordered a Gun Salute to be fired in his honour. He also became the first mountaineer to examine the western face of Kangchenjunga, which rises from the Kanchenjunga Glacier. Freshfield described Siniolchu as "The Most Superb Triumph of Mountain Architecture and The Most Beautiful Snow Mountain in the World".

In 1905 he attempted to climb Rwenzori Abruzzi in Uganda but failed due to bad weather. However the Freshfield Pass on the mountain was named after him.

== Alpine Club and RGS ==
Freshfield wrote extensively about travel and the Alps, editing the Alpine Journal from 1872 to 1880. He was a Fellow of the Royal Geographical Society and became its joint secretary in 1881. At that time he was living at Stanhope Gardens, and by 1891 at Camden Hill, Hampstead. He was president of the Alpine Club from 1893 to 1895, chairman of the Society of Authors from 1908 to 1909, and president of the Association of Geographical Teachers from 1897 to 1910.

In 1904, he was president of the Geographical Section of the British Association. He was awarded the Founder's Medal of the Royal Geographical Society in 1903, became a vice-president of the society in 1906 and its president from 1914 until 1917. He became a trustee of the RGS in 1924. University College, Oxford made him an honorary fellow, and he was awarded honorary degrees of Doctor of Civil Laws at the University of Oxford and the University of Geneva

== Personal ==
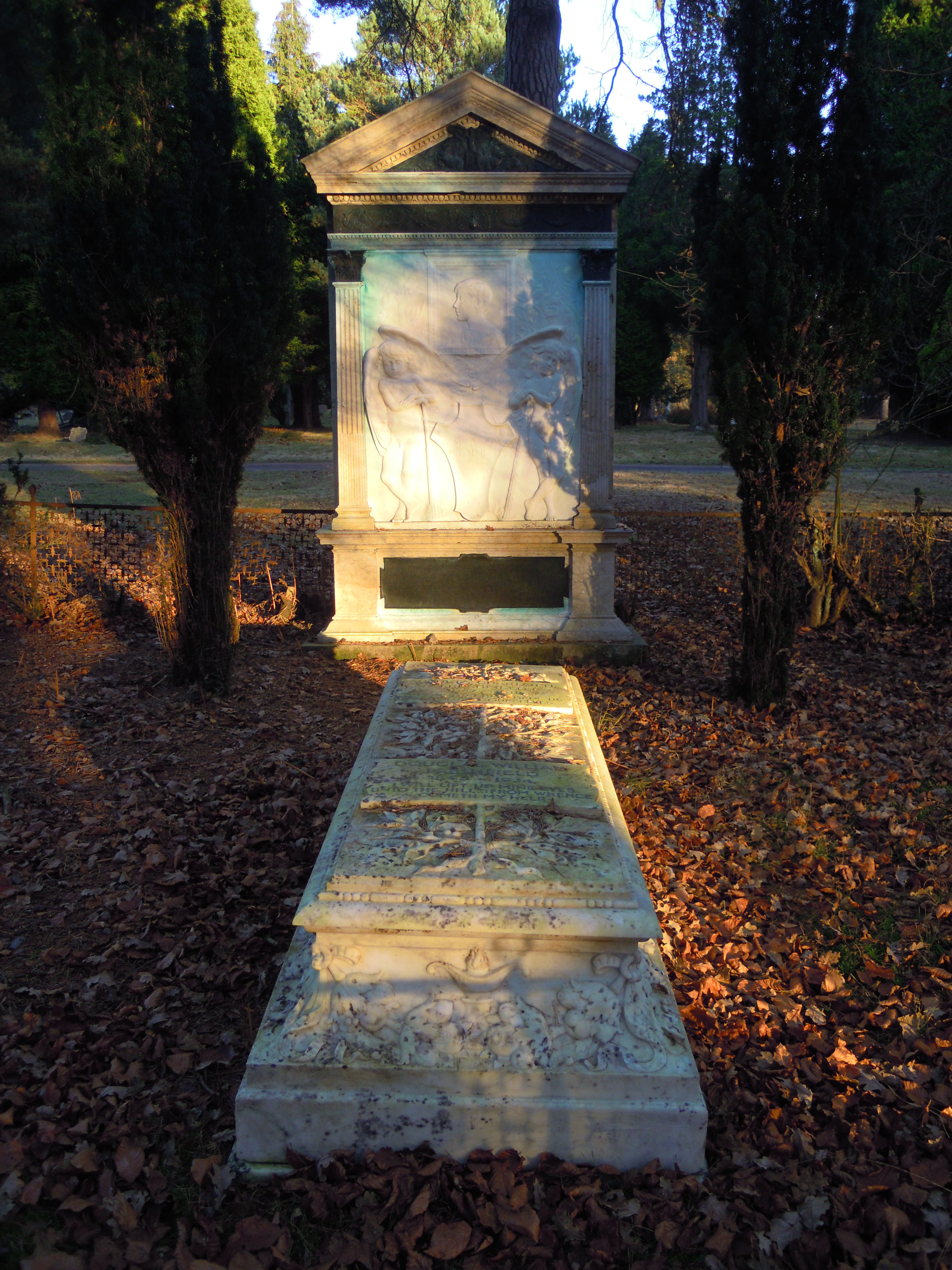
Grave of Douglas and Augusta Freshfield with the memorial to their son Henry Douglas Fairfield

Freshfield married Augusta Charlotte Ritchie (1847–1911) on 27 November 1869. She was the daughter of William Ritchie and the sister of Sir Richmond Ritchie. They had four daughters and a son, Henry Douglas Freshfield, who died aged fourteen in 1891. The family loss was the occasion of a memorial gift for the people of Forest Row in the form of a building to be used as a parochial hall and institute.

The first Freshfield Hall was very short-lived, for it was burnt down on 14 February 1895. Douglas Freshfield and his wife wasted no time in having it rebuilt and it reopened on 17 November 1895. At the reopening Freshfield expressed the wishes of his wife and himself when he hoped the hall would be used by all classes of parishioners, and that it would keep alive the memory of its original founder.

Freshfield became friends with Violet Needham, a nearby neighbor in Forest Row. Cultured, adventurous, and well-educated, Freshfield and Charles Needham are believed to have inspired many of the heroes in Violet Needham’s works.

Freshfield died at Wych Cross Place, Forest Row, Sussex. He is buried at Brookwood Cemetery in front of the memorial to his son Henry Douglas Freshfield (1877–1891), which was carved by Edward Onslow Ford. This memorial consists of a pediment displaying a relief of Apollo in his chariot below which is a bas-relief group of two naked putti with inverted torches, emblems of death, above which is a profile portrait of the young Henry Freshfield wearing an Eton collar. The monument has been Grade II listed since 2004.

== Writing ==
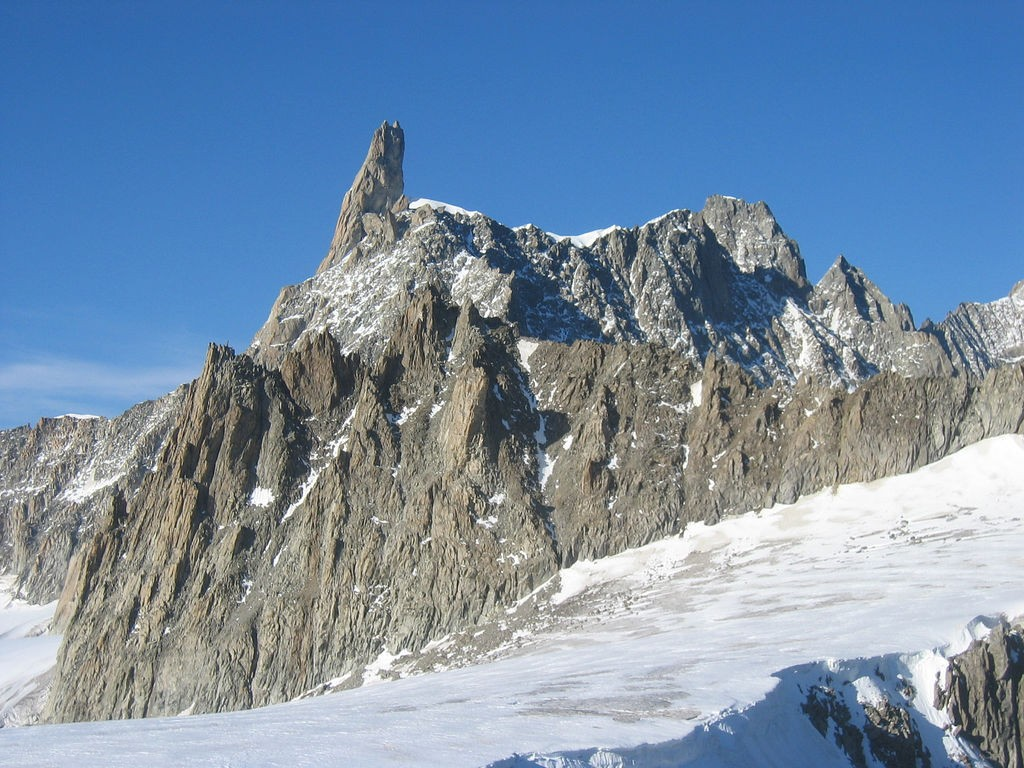
The sharp pinnacle of the Dent du Géant (left) at the western end of the Rochefort ridge (centre).

Freshfield's mother was a mountaineer and author as well, and considered it important to educate her son in the appreciation of nature and the arts. From an early age his parents took him on journeys which included the English Lake District and Scotland. When he was eight his father started taking the family on holiday in Switzerland, particularly the Alps. The ten years of summer holidays in the Swiss and Italian Alps greatly impressed the child. He said, sixty years later, in an interview with Adolf Hess:

I think that, without any interruption, for the following ten years, I went each August to the Alps with my parents, and I experienced not only the easy trips, but also many less usual destinations. We toured the Monte Bianco, the Monte Rosa and the Bernina Range; we went to Arolla, to Evolene, to Cogne, in Val Formazza, in the Glarus Alps, to Davos, to Livigno and in the Vorderrhein. Some maps I drew still show our yearly itineraries. We climbed Mount Titlis, the Jazzi Peak, the Mittelhorn, and some other peaks of moderate height. But as those didn't satisfy my ambition, in 1863 I decided to try alone the Gran Paradiso, where the unforgiving weather stopped me. I was able, anyway, to pass through the Dent du Géant, and to climb the Monte Bianco.
The following year I was ready to begin my excursions with two of my schoolmates, and I made the march recorded in Across Country from Thonon to Trent (printed privately)

Mrs Freshfield was an author herself and her publications included "Alpine Byways" and "A Tour of the Grisons". Valeria Azzolini wrote about her in I resoconti di viaggio di Freshfield ("Freshfield's Travel Journals"):

Lover of the mountain in the youngest and truest sense, hurry was unknown to her because it wasn't really reaching the top which insterested her, but the captivation of the landscapes she encountered on the path, and thus the hours she spent in that enjoyment.
Apart from the members of the family, there was another protagonist in Mrs Freshfield's narrations: the guide, Michel Alphonse Couttet. And it was surely in those years that the young Freshfield understood the importance, in every mountain action, of the presence of a good guide.

Freshfield believed in good companionship more than the physical exercise when climbing. When he had almost reached the end of his career, he stated:

My highest ambition has never been to spend my days in strenuous exercises to develop my muscles. No other mountaineering moment was instead more appreciated by me than that in which I could enjoy the landscape, while the others had to open a path.

In his first work, The Italian Alps (1875), he abandoned himself to enjoying the mountains, writing with an elegant descriptive ability. He repeatedly refined his drafts about his excursions and mountaineering, like an ante litteram correspondent. This made him one of the best prepared and finest 19th century linguists in the UK to write about exploring Italy. As an instinctive and inspired narrator, he reported ecstatically on all the mysterious wonders of the Alps. He wanted to hare these with the rest of Europe and described the characteristics of the Alps with unrivalled sharpness. His descriptions were from all angles – poetic, ethnographic, and scientific. Letting the reader into the atmosphere of the Giudicarie Alps he noted:

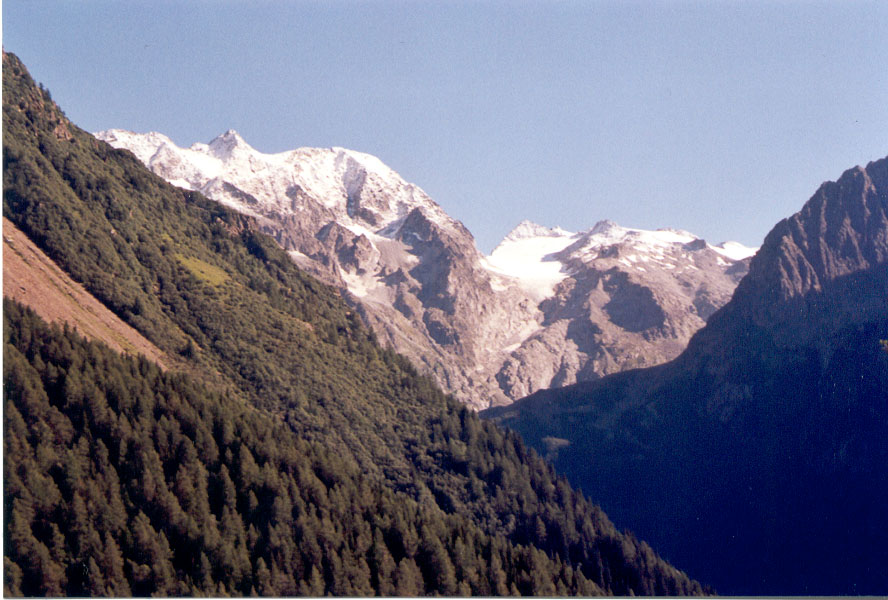
Adamello seen from the Tonale Pass road

The low elevation of the valleys, their sunny exposure, and the gentle slope of their hillsides, give the scenery an air of richness rarely found at the base of great snow-mountains. The frequent and gay-looking villages, the woods of chestnuts, the knots of walnut-trees, the great fields of yellow-podded maize, the luxuriant vines and orchards, have the charm which the spontaneous bounty and colour of southern nature always exercise on the native of the more reserved and sober North. No contrast could be at once more sudden and more welcome than that offered by these softer landscapes to the eye fresh from the rugged granite of the Adamello chain.

Nobody who had entered the Giudicarie valleys previously had revealed so much in spite of the humble dolomitic reality. He dedicated further pages to the familiar Val Rendena.

The road, winding at first high on a woody hillside, commands a charming view of the upper valley as far as Pinzolo. Orchards and cornfields separate the rapidly succeeding hamlets, each of which resmbles its neighbour. The method of construction in this country is peculiar. The lower stories only, containing the living-rooms, are built of stone; from the top of their walls rise large upright beams supporting an immensely broad roof. The spaces between the beams are not filled up, and the whole edifice has the air of having been begun on too large a scale, and temporarily completed, and roofed in.
The great upstairs barn is used as for the storage of wood, hay, corn, and all sorts of inflammable dry goods. The roof being also of wood, the lightning finds it easy enough to set the whole mass in a blaze, and fires arising from this cause are of common occurrence.

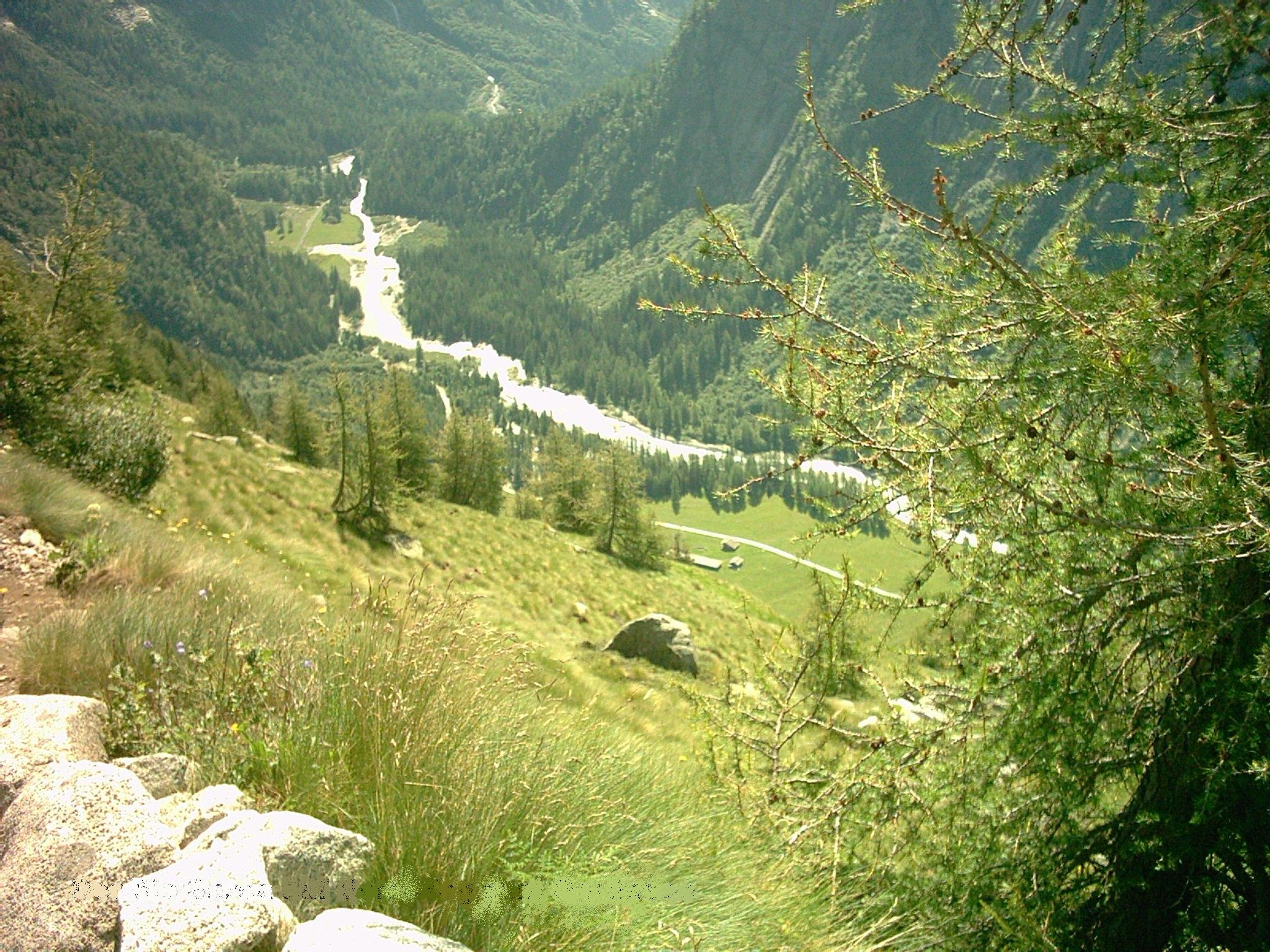
The Sarca River in Val Genova

These lines recollect a Rendena which no longer exists, but they can still teach those who are passionate about mountains to discover and preserve whatever remains that is still untouched by time or the hand of man.

Below us lay the smooth level of the Val d'Algone; on one side rose the bare, torn and fretted face of a great dolomite, surrounded by lower ridges scarcely less precipitous, but clothed in green wherever trees or herbage could take root. Towards the south the distant hills beyond the Sarca waved in gradations of purple and blue through the shimmer of the Italian sunshine. A short zigzag through thick copses took us down to the meadows. The large solitary building in their midst is a glass manufactory. At this point a good car-road begins, which branching lower down leads either to Tione or Stenico.
The loftier dolomites were soon lost to view behind a bend in the valley, and the road plunged down a deep and narrow glen between banks of nodding cyclamens, bold crags, and the greenest of green hillsides.

After his expeditions around Kangchenjunga Freshfield wrote of Dzongri:

Suddenly you are in the presence of the Snow mountain unless they are indeed as they seem, in the first awestruck moment of beholding, embodied spirits of overwhelming power and malignity. Below you is the Prague Chu Valley; before you on the other side, long line of mountains-a succession of terrible granite spires, running down, one and all so steep and jagged that it seems as if no snow could ever cling to their sides. They have been fearfully searched by winds that mark the course in sweep of the wrinkled drifts and all the scars and lines run downwards giving the mountains an infinitely cheerless and depreciating expression like a sad, worn face.

== Works ==
- Travels in the Central Caucasus and Bashan including Visits to Ararat and Tabreez and Ascents of Kazbek and Elbruz, London, Longmans, Green and Co., 1869
- Italian Alps: Sketches in the Mountains of Ticino, Lombardy, the Trentino, and Venetia, 1875, new ed. 1937
- The Exploration of the Caucasus, London, Edward Arnold, 1896
- Round Kangchinjinga (Kangchenjunga), Alpine Journal, Vol. XX, no. 149, August 1900
- Round Kangchenjunga: A Narrative of Mountain Travel and Exploration, London, Edward Arnold, 1903. Dedicated to Joseph Dalton Hooker
- Hannibal Once More (1914)
- The Life of Horace Benedict de Saussure (with the collaboration of F. Montagnier), London, Edward Arnold, 1920
- Below the Snow Line, London, Constable and Co., 1923
- Books by Douglas W. Freshfield in Internet Archive
