= Henry Freshfield =

Henry Freshfield may refer to:

- Henry Ray Freshfield (1814–1895), British lawyer and mountaineer
- Jane Freshfield (1814–1901), described as Mrs Henry Freshfield, British travel writer
