= Matthew Wood =

Matthew Wood may refer to:

== Sportspeople ==
- Sir Matthew Wood, 4th Baronet (1857–1908), English cricketer
- Matthew Wood (rugby league) (born 1969), Australian rugby league footballer
- Matthew Wood (cricketer, born 1977), English cricketer with Glamorgan CCC
- Matthew Wood (cricketer, born 1980), English cricketer with Nottinghamshire, previously played for Somerset
- Matthew Wood (cricketer, born 1985), English cricketer
- Matthew Wood (ice hockey) (born 2005), Canadian ice hockey player

== Others ==
- Matthew Wood (sound editor) (born 1972), American sound editor and voice actor
- Sir Matthew Wood, 1st Baronet (1768–1843), MP and Lord Mayor of London
- Matthew Wood, drummer with British Sea Power
- Matthew W. Wood (1879–1969), farmer and political figure on Prince Edward Island
- Matt Wood, who stars on the instructional DVDs of his brother Peter K. Wood, magician
- Matthew Wood, killed in the January 2013 Vauxhall helicopter crash
- Matt Wood (technologist), (born 1979), British computer scientist and technologist

== See also ==
- Matt Woods (disambiguation)
