= Jane Crawford =

Jane Crawford may refer to:

- Jane Todd Crawford, patient from whom Ephraim McDowell removed an ovarian tumour in 1809
- Jane Freshfield (1814–1901), born Jane Quenton Crawford, English travel writer
- Jane Crawford, a fictional character from the HBO television series Watchmen
