= Stewardson =

Stewardson may refer to:

== People ==
- Deon Stewardson (1951–2017), British-South African actor
- Joe Stewardson, South African film actor
- Thomas Stewardson (1781–1859), British portrait painter
- Trevor Stewardson (born 1977), Canadian boxer

== Places ==
- Stewardson, Illinois
- Stewardson Township, Pennsylvania
