= Chak 168/171 NB =

Chak No. 168/171 NB چک منگلا
- Village
- Location in Pakistan
- Coordinates: 31°50′10″N 72°29′45″E
- Country: Pakistan
- Province: Punjab
- District: Sargodha

Chak 168/171 NB, also known as Chak Mangla, is a village in Sargodha District, Punjab, Pakistan.

== History ==
In the early 1900s, the British government, in order to drive rebels (like Dulla Bhatti) out of the jungles of Punjab, decided to open the Sargodha, Lyallpur (now Faisalabad) and Montgomery (now Sahiwal) area for farming and population settlement. Sir James Broadwood Lyall and his engineers came up with the whole plan of various villages and instead of giving them typical names, the team chose to number them according to their location from water streams derived from the Jhelum River.

The tribe of Mangla was selected to reside in two villages or Check(points) or Chaks: Chak No. 168 and 171. Tribal chiefs requested the local government to allow them to live in the same village, so some changes were made to the maps and they let it be Chak 168/171.
