= James Broadwood Lyall =

British colonial administrator (1838-1916)

Sir James Broadwood Lyall GCIE KCSI
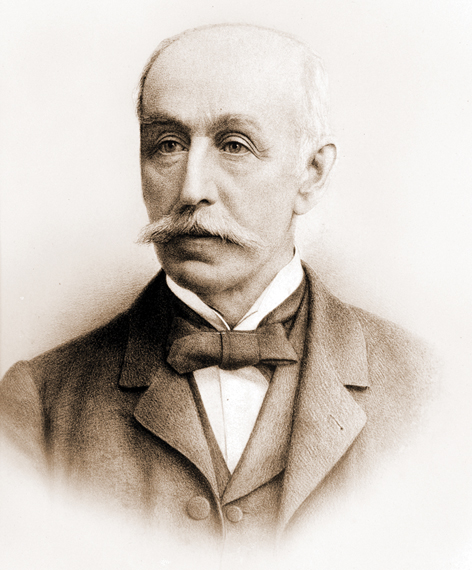

Lieutenant Governor of Punjab
- In office 2 April 1887 – 5 March 1892
- Governors General: The Marquess of Dufferin and Ava; The Marquess of Lansdowne
- Preceded by: Sir Charles Umpherston Aitchison
- Succeeded by: Sir Dennis Fitzpatrick

Personal details
- Born: 4 March 1838 England
- Died: 4 December 1916 (aged 78) Eastry, Kent, England
- Education: Haileybury College
- Education: Eton College
- Alma mater: Haileybury College
- Parents: Alfred Lyall (father); Mary Drummond (mother)
- Relatives: Alfred Comyn Lyall (brother); William Rowe Lyall (uncle); George Lyall (uncle)

Sir James Broadwood Lyall GCIE KCSI (4 March 1838 – 4 December 1916) was a British administrator in the Imperial Civil Service who served as Lieutenant Governor of the Punjab between 1887 and 1892.

== Background ==
James Lyall was born on 4 March 1838. He was a son of Alfred Lyall and Mary Drummond. His elder brother was Alfred Comyn Lyall, and his paternal uncles included a Dean of Canterbury, William Rowe Lyall, and a chairman of the British East India Company, George Lyall. He was educated first at Eton College and then at Haileybury College.

== Imperial Civil Service ==
=== Career ===
He joined the Bengal Civil Service in 1857, arriving in India the following year. He served with the Punjab commission until the end of 1859 and went on to serve as the financial commissioner of the Punjab. He was the first vice-chancellor of the University of the Punjab, a post to which he was appointed in October 1882.

Between 1883 and 1887, Lyall served in southern India as the Resident in Mysore and Chief Commissioner of Coorg. From 1887 to1892, Lyall was Lieutenant Governor of the Punjab. He was appointed as a Knight Commander of the Order of the Star of India in 1888.

On 5 March 1892 he laid the foundation stone of the Khalsa College.

=== Canal Colonies ===
From 1882 Lyall was instrumental in formulating what would become known as the Triple Project, a bold plan to transform 6,000,000 acres (2,400,000 ha) of desert and barren land into agricultural land through the development of canal colonies. As Lieutenant Governor he helped establish Lyallpur, one of the first planned cities in British India, as the headquarters of the Chenab Colony and which was named in his honour. Later a new district was created in the Colony, also named in his honour - Lyallpur district.

== Later life ==
Lyall was appointed as Knight Grand Commander of the Indian Empire in May 1892, after ending his tenure in the Punjab. In 1893, he was appointed to the Royal Commission on Opium, which he thought was an official attempt to procrastinate in order to silence opposition to opium use and its trade. Lyall believed there was nothing untoward about moderate use of opium. In 1898, he served as President of the Indian Famine Commission.

He died on 4 December 1916 in Eastry, Kent and is buried in the local churchyard.

== Publications ==
Lyall contributed a chapter on the Punjab to The British Empire series, published in 1899.
