= Alfred Comyn Lyall =

British civil servant, historian, and poet (1835-1911)

The Right Honourable Sir Alfred Lyall GCIE KCB PC FBA
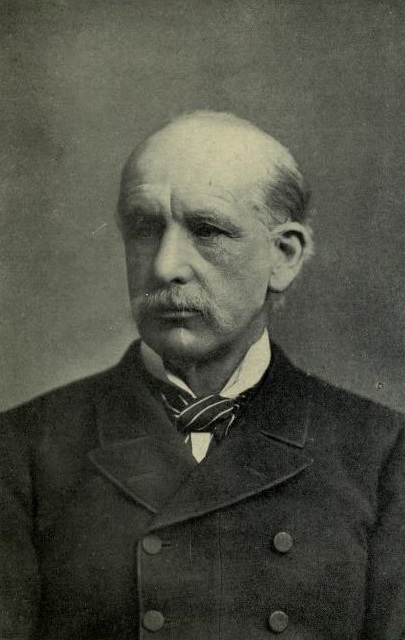
- Portrait of Alfred Comyn Lyall
- Born: 4 January 1835; Coulsdon, Surrey, England
- Died: 10 April 1911 (aged 76); Freshwater, Isle of Wight
- Education: Eton College
- Alma mater: Haileybury College
- Spouse: Cornelia Arnoldina Cloete (m. 1862)
- Children: 4
- Parents: Alfred Lyall (father); Mary Drummond Broadwood (mother)
- Relatives: James Broadwood Lyall (brother); James Shudi Broadwood (maternal grandfather); George Lyall (uncle); William Rowe Lyall (uncle)

Sir Alfred Comyn Lyall GCIE, KCB, PC, FBA (4 January 1835 – 10 April 1911) was a British civil servant, literary historian and poet.

== Early life ==
Alfred Lyall was born in Coulsdon, Surrey, the second son of Alfred Lyall and Mary Drummond Broadwood, daughter of James Shudi Broadwood. He was educated at Eton College. His elder brother, James Broadwood Lyall, was already serving in India, and this may have influenced him towards a career in that direction. He attended Haileybury College with that purpose in mind. In 1862 he married Cora Cloete, daughter of Peter Cloete. He died while on a sojourn to Farringford House, the family home of Alfred, Lord Tennyson, in Freshwater, Isle of Wight.

== Indian career ==
After Eton and Haileybury, Lyall joined the Indian Civil Service in 1856, and served a long career in India. He landed at Calcutta in January 1856. After four months of training he was posted as an Assistant Magistrate at Bulandshahr in the North-West Provinces. He was there when the Indian Rebellion of 1857 occurred: his house was burned down and he was nearly killed when fleeing as his horse was shot from under him. He joined the Khaki Risala of Volunteers, an irregular European cavalry unit. He helped "pacify" Bulandshahr. In May 1858 he was transferred to Shahjehanpur where he helped "restore order". In April 1861 he returned to England for about eighteen months. On his return to India he was appointed Assistant Magistrate at Agra. In 1864 he was appointed district manager of Nagpur at Hoshungabad in the Central Provinces, before being appointed commissioner in Berar in 1867. He was now earning £3,000 a year. He went on to become Home Secretary to the Government of India in 1873 and the governor-general's agent in the state of Rajputana the following year. His next post was as Foreign Secretary to Government of India from 1878 to 1881 (during this period he helped negotiate peace and a monarchy in Afghanistan). He was then appointed Lieutenant-Governor of North-West Provinces, and Chief Commissioner of Oudh (North-West Provinces) from 1882 to 1887 (he introduced a degree of local self-government to that area). He also founded the University of Allahabad and became its first chancellor. He was made an honorary fellow of King's College, Cambridge, in 1893. He was made a member of the Privy Council in 1902, having served on the India Council from 1888 to 1902.

Lyall's ideas regarding the development and organisation of society in India were developed principally during the time he spent working in the Central Provinces, Berar and Rajputana between 1865 and 1878. He was, in the opinion of Crispin Bates, "one of the more programmatic of nineteenth century writers on Indian history" and his writings on the subject are "somewhat dubious". Another historian, Clive Dewey, believes that

Lyall was generally recognised as one of the most brilliant civilians of his generation; he retired, after a dazzling career, as governor of the United Provinces. Cadres composed exclusively of action men do not produce savants like Lyall; still less do they turn them into heroes.

== Awards and honours ==
Lyall was made a Knight Commander of the Order of the Indian Empire (KCIE) in 1887, Knight Commander of the Order of the Bath (KCB) in 1881, and Knight Grand Commander of the Order of the Indian Empire (GCIE) in 1896. He was appointed a Privy Counsellor on 11 August 1902, following an announcement of the King's intention to make this appointment in the 1902 Coronation Honours list published in June that year. In Bulandshahr, a water tank was erected opposite Colvin Gate, and named after Lyall.

== Literary ==
His Verses Written in India was published in 1889. He wrote a number of other books on poetry. He wrote also books on Indian history, Warren Hastings, and Alfred Lord Tennyson. His literary achievements brought him advanced degrees, a D.C.L. from Oxford (1889) and an LL.D. from Cambridge (1891), an Honorary Fellow of King's College, Cambridge (1893), and membership in the British Academy (1902).

A more comprehensive list of his known publications is given below:

- Asiatic Studies, Religious and Social: First Series. London: John Murray. 1882.
- The Rise and Expansion of the British Dominion in India. (John Murray. London, 1893)
- Warren Hastings (English Men of Action Series). (Macmillan & Co. London, 1889)
- Verses Written in India. (Kegan Paul, Trench. London, 1889)
- Asiatic Studies: Religious and Social in India, China & Asia: Second Series. London: John Murray. 1899.
- Tennyson (English Men of Letters series). (Macmillan & Co. London, 1902)
- The Life of the Marquis of Dufferin and Ava, 2 vols. (John Murray. London, 1905)
- Etudes sur les moeurs religieuses et socials de l'Extrême-Orient. (French translation of Asiatic Studies, First & Second Series: Fontemoing, Paris. 1907–1908)
- Studies in Literature and History. (published posthumously by John Murray. London, 1915)

== Family ==
Lyall married Cornelia Arnoldina Cloete (c. 1836 – 1913) at Stoke-by-Clare, Suffolk on 12 November 1862. They had four children (two sons and two daughters). Their second daughter Mary Evelina (1868–1948) married the Indian civil servant John Ontario Miller (1857–1943). Lyall was also guardian to Malcolm Lyall Darling, who was subsequently knighted.

Lyall's uncles included George Lyall (1779–1853), a chairman of the East India Company, and William Rowe Lyall (1788–1857), a dean of Canterbury (1845–1857). His brother James Broadwood Lyall (1838–1916) also served in the Indian Civil Service, becoming Lieutenant-Governor of the Punjab. His sister Mary Sybilla (1836–1891) was married to Francis James Holland (1828–1907) Canon at Canterbury Cathedral.

Government offices
Preceded by Sir George Ebenezer Wilson Couper	Lieutenant Governor of the North-Western Provinces and Chief Commissioner of Oudh; 17 April 1882 – 21 November 1887	Succeeded by Sir Auckland Colvin
