= Sir John Key, 1st Baronet =

English stationer and politician (1794–1858)

Sir John Key, 1st Baronet (16 August 1794 – 14 July 1858) was a wholesale stationer and Whig politician in England.

He was elected Sheriff of the City of London in 1824 and Lord Mayor of London for two years, from 1830 to 1832.

He was elected at the 1832 general election as a member of parliament (MP) for the City of London, but resigned his seat on 5 August 1833 by taking the Chiltern Hundreds. During his parliamentary career he supported the abolition of slavery, the repeal of part of the assessed taxes, abrogation of the Corn Laws, the adoption of triennial parliaments and the vote by ballot.

He was made a baronet in 1831, of Thornbury and Denmark Hill. In 1853 he ran for election to the office of Chamberlain of the City of London, emerging victorious after a closely fought contest with the young liveryman Benjamin Scott. He died in the office of Chamberlain, and Scott was elected unopposed in his stead.

He died at his home in Streatham on 14 July 1858 and was buried at West Norwood Cemetery.

John Key married Charlotte Green on 17 Aug 1814. They had five children:

1. Kingsmill Grove (born 7 May 1815)
2. Thomas Kelly (10 July 1819)
3. Elizabeth Susan (13 March 1821)
4. Lucy Wilson (18 November 1822)
5. Charlotte Marian (7 May 1826)

Lucy Wilson Key married George Parbury (his second wife) on 22 March 1849 at St Mary, Thornbury in Gloucestershire.

Parliament of the United Kingdom
| Preceded by William Venables; Robert Waithman; William Thompson; Sir Matthew Wood | Member of Parliament for the City of London; 1832 – August 1833; With: Sir Matthew Wood 1817–43; Robert Waithman to March 1833; George Grote 1832–41; George Lyall from March 1833 | Succeeded by William Crawford; George Lyall; Sir Matthew Wood; George Grote |
Civic offices
| Preceded by John Crowder | Lord Mayor of London; 1830–1832 | Succeeded by Sir Peter Laurie |
Baronetage of the United Kingdom
| New creation | Baronet (of Thornbury and Denmark Hill); 1831–1858 | Succeeded by Kingsmill Grove Key |
