= Key baronets =

Extinct baronetcy in the Baronetage of the United Kingdom

Escutcheon of the Key baronets

The Key baronetcy, of Thornbury in the County of Gloucester and of Denmark Hill in the County of Surrey, was a title in the Baronetage of the United Kingdom. It was created on 17 August 1831 for John Key, Lord Mayor of London between 1830 and 1831. The title became extinct on the death of the 4th Baronet in 1932.

== Key baronets, of Thornbury and Denmark Hill (1831) ==
- Sir John Key, 1st Baronet (1794–1858)
- Sir Kingsmill Grove Key, 2nd Baronet (1815–1899)
- Sir John Kingsmill Causton Key, 3rd Baronet (1853–1926)
- Sir Kingsmill James Key, 4th Baronet (1864–1932). He left no heir.

Baronetage of the United Kingdom
Preceded by Macgregor baronets	Key baronets of Thornbury and Denmark Hill; 17 August 1831	Succeeded by Greenhill-Russell baronets
