= John Masterman (MP) =

John Masterman MP DL DCL (1781 – 23 January 1862) was a banker, director and British Conservative Party politician.

Masterman worked for the firm and became a board member of Masterman, Peters, Mildred, and Company, London bankers. He was also a Director of the East India Company, and later was appointed a Deputy Lieutenant of London.

He was elected at the 1841 general election as one of the four Members of Parliament (MPs) for the City of London. He was re-elected in 1847 and 1852, and held the seat until he stood down from the House of Commons at the 1857 general election. A traditional Tory Anglican, he was "prepared to resist any concessions to Popery", he represented the City during the Victorian financial revolution spurred on by big capitalist fortunes and the founding of Sir Robert Peel's new party. He bought a large mansion townhouse at 35 Nicholas Lane, off Lombard Street in the heart of the financial district. In the Essex countryside, he purchased a wooded retreat at Knot's Green in leafy Leyton (now in the east end of Greater London). Masterman took the Chiltern Hundreds in 1857, and died on 23 January 1862.

The University of Oxford awarded Masterman a Doctorate of Civil Laws on 5 July 1848.

Parliament of the United Kingdom
Preceded by George Grote; James Pattison; William Crawford; Sir Matthew Wood, Bt	Member of Parliament for the City of London; 1841 – 1857; With: Sir Matthew Wood, Bt to 1843; George Lyall 1841–47; Lord John Russell 1841–61; James Pattison 1843–49; Baron Lionel de Rothschild from 1847; Sir James Duke, Bt from 1849	Succeeded by Robert Wigram Crawford; Baron Lionel de Rothschild; Lord John Russell; Sir James Duke, Bt
