= Hareston, Brixton =

Historic estate in Devon, England

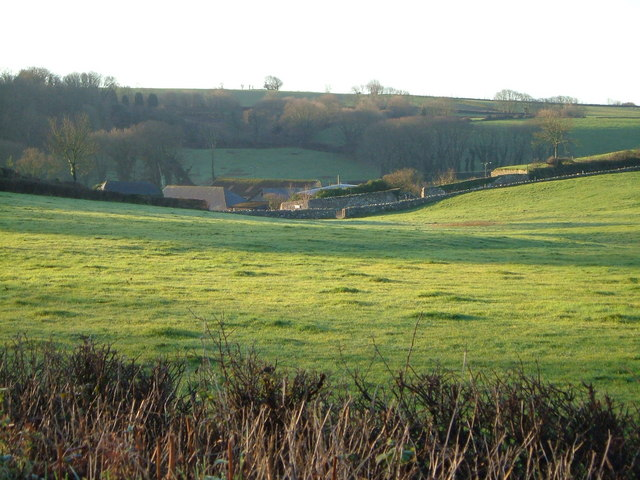
Hareston Farm in 2006

Hareston (anciently Harestone, Harston, etc.) is an historic estate in the parish of Brixton, about three miles from Plymouth in Devon. The mansion house built during the reign of King Henry VII (1485–1509) burned down partially in an accidental fire at the beginning of the 18th century, and in 1822 the surviving part, the Hall and Chapel, was being used as a farmhouse. It was described by Candida Lycett Green in her 1991 book The Perfect English Country House as: "The most forgotten Manor House Farm In England, untouched for hundreds of years, sits safely, impossible to find, down miles of private sunken lanes which in the spring brim with Campion, Bluebells, Purple Orchids, Primroses, Violets, Speedwell and Stitchwort. Wooded hills rise behind this, the quintessence of an ancient English Manor House".

== Descent ==
=== Domesday Book ===
It is listed in the Domesday Book of 1086 as two separate holdings, both spelled Harestane, the 29th and 51st of the 79 Devonshire holdings of Robert, Count of Mortain, half-brother and one of the Devon Domesday Book tenants-in-chief of King William the Conqueror. His tenant at the first mentioned holding was a certain "Reginald", namely Reginald I de Vautort, Feudal baron of Trematon in Cornwall, who held several estates from the Count of Mortain in Devon, Somerset and Cornwall. Before the Norman Conquest of England in 1066 it had been held by an Anglo-Saxon named Edric. The Count's tenant at the second named holding (whose earlier Anglo-Saxon tenant had been Sweet) was also Reginald.

=== Later holders ===
Arms of Woode of Hareston: Argent, on a mount in base proper an oak tree vert fructed or

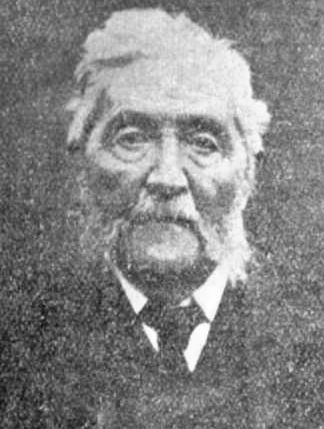
Thomas Winter-Wood (1818–1905), the noted chess-player, who sold Hareston in several lots in 1888 and moved to The Crescent, Plymouth. He founded Devon's first chess club in Plymouth in 1888

The earliest holder recorded by the Devon historian Risdon (d.1640) was the Reignald (sic) family. It is next recorded as held by Walter de Coliford (alias Walter Colaford) in 1242 One of his progeny, Hugh de Coliford, adopted the surname de Harston. It later passed to the Silverlock family, Peter Silverlock being the holder in 1366. The estate was subsequently the seat of the Carslake family, whose daughter and heiress married John Wood (alias Atwood), the son of William Wood by his wife the daughter and heiress of Walter Wibble of Venn in Devon. The Wood family remained seated at Hareston from before the time of Risdon (d.1640) until the male line expired on the death of John Wood (d.1743), who died without issue, leaving his two sisters as his co-heiresses. Elizabeth Wood died unmarried so the whole estate became the inheritance of the other sister Audrian Wood, the wife of John Winter, and mother of John Wood Winter, the possessor of the estate in 1810. In 1822 the family was represented by John Wood Winter who resided at Lower Harston. The noted chess-player Thomas Winter-Wood (1818–1905), educated at nearby Plympton Grammar School, was a member of this family, and sold the Hareston estate in 1868/9, his father having in 1824 reversed the order of the surname. Another prominent descendant of a branch of the Wood family of Hareston was Sir Matthew Wood, 1st Baronet (1768–1843), ancestor of the present Page-Wood baronets, who quarter the arms of Carslake of Hareston: Argent, a bull's head erased sable.
