= Evelyn-Wood baronets =

Title in the Baronetage of the United Kingdom

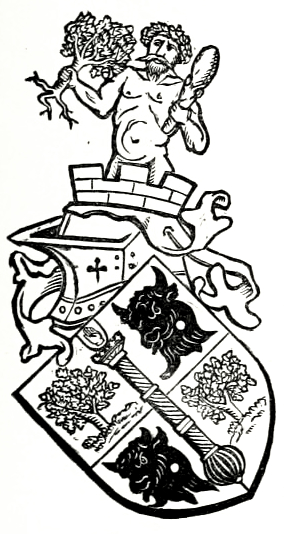
Coat of arms of the Wood baronets of Hatherley House

The Wood, later Page Wood Baronetcy, later Evelyn-Wood Baronetcy, of Hatherley House in the County of Gloucester, is a title in the Baronetage of the United Kingdom. It was created on 16 December 1837 for Matthew Wood, Lord Mayor of London from 1815 to 1817 and Whig Member of Parliament for the City of London from 1817 to 1843. The fifth Baronet assumed the additional surname of Page.

== Wood baronets, of Hatherley House (1837) ==
- Sir Matthew Wood, 1st Baronet (1768–1843)
- Rev Sir John Page Wood, 2nd Baronet (1796–1866)
- Sir Francis Wood, 3rd Baronet (1834–1868)
- Sir Matthew Wood, 4th Baronet (1857–1908)
- Sir John Page Wood, 5th Baronet (1860–1912)
- Sir John Stuart Page Wood, 6th Baronet (1898–1955)
- Sir John Hatherley David Page Wood, 7th Baronet (1921–1955)
- Sir Anthony John Page Wood, 8th Baronet (1951–2025)
- Sir Mark William Evelyn-Wood, 9th Baronet (born 1940)

The heir apparent is the 9th Baronet's only son, Martin Evelyn-Wood (born 1963).

== Extended family ==
William Wood, 1st Baron Hatherley, Lord High Chancellor of Great Britain from 1868 to 1872, was the second son of the first Baronet while Field Marshal Sir Evelyn Wood was the fifth son of the second Baronet. Also, Katharine O'Shea, known for her relationship with Charles Stewart Parnell, was the daughter of the second Baronet. The theosophist and political activist Annie Besant (born Annie Wood), was the great-granddaughter of the 1st Baronet's father.

== Heraldry ==
Arms of Woode of Hareston: Argent, on a mount in base proper an oak tree vert fructed or

The 1st Baronet was descended from the Wood family of Hareston in the parish of Brixton in Devon, which the family had inherited by marriage to the heiress of the Carslake family. The Page-Wood baronets quarter the arms of Carslake Argent, a bull's head erased sable.

== See also ==
- Evelyn baronets
- Page baronets
- Wood baronets

== Notes ==
Baronetage of the United Kingdom
Preceded by Clark baronets	Wood baronets of Hatherley House; 16 December 1837	Succeeded by O'Loghlen baronets
