= John Hoppus =

English philosopher and educational reformer

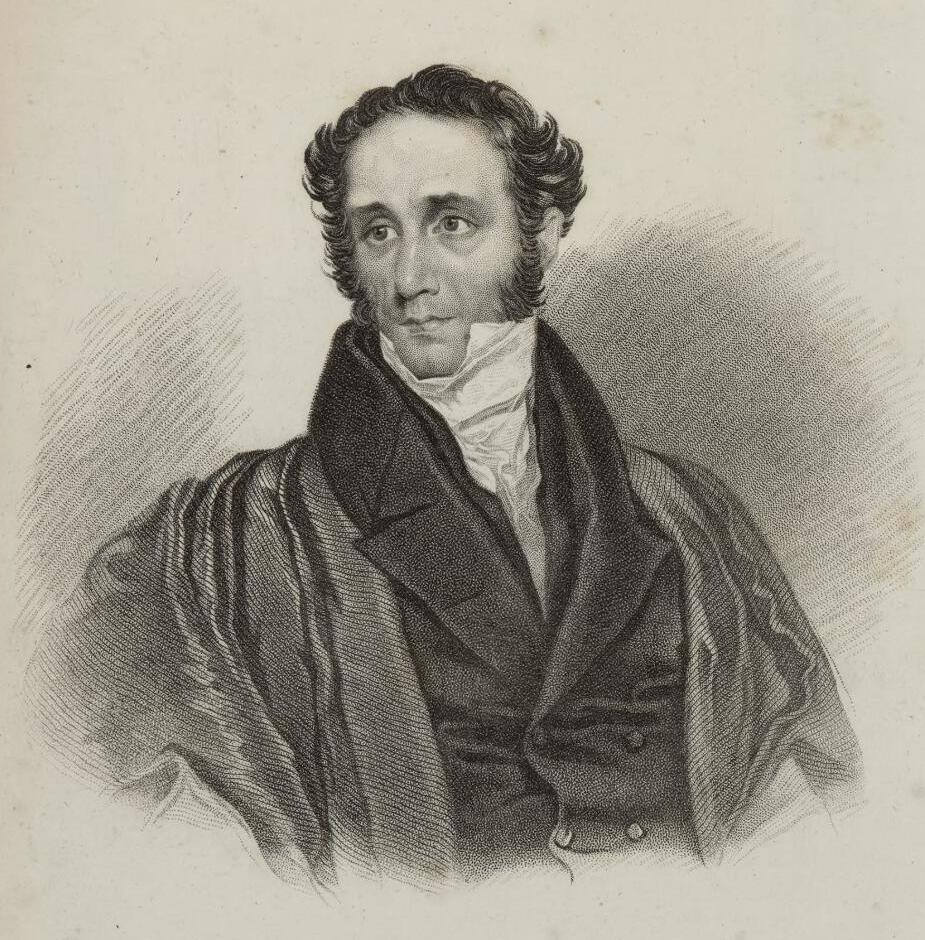
Portrait of John Hoppus

John Hoppus FRS (1789–1875) was an English Congregational minister, author, Fellow of the Royal Society, abolitionist and educational reformer. He was appointed the first Chair of Logic and Philosophy of Mind at the newly formed London University (now University College, London), a position he secured and held against his formidable opponents from 1829 to 1866.

== Early life ==
John Hoppus was born in London. He was educated at a dissenting academy in the north of England, the Rotherham Independent College, and completed his studies first at Edinburgh University under Dugald Stewart, then at Glasgow University where Thomas Chalmers taught. Between 1824 and 1825 he was pastor of the independent Carter Lane Chapel, Bermondsey.

== University appointment ==
When Hoppus was a young man, England had only two universities, Oxford and Cambridge, and they were restricted to Anglicans. This led to the emergence of many privately funded independent dissenting academies, many of which functioned as colleges, preparing young men for university studies abroad, in Scotland or on the Continent. In the early nineteenth century, a group of English reformers with liberal educational ideas promoted the idea of a place of further education that might open its doors to men of all religious affiliations or beliefs. This proposal succeeded between 1825 and 1828 with the founding of London University, now University College London, the first entirely nondenominational college of higher education in England.

The new college wanted to establish academic, moral and political philosophy in its curriculum, so it decided, as early as 1827, to appoint two chairs of philosophy – one of Logic and the Philosophy of the Human Mind, and the other of Moral and Political philosophy. The former position was intended to teach students about knowledge and the acquisition of ideas, and the second with translation of this into moral and political human action.

Candidates for the two posts were sought in 1827. London University was opposed by the more traditional of the high church sections of the establishment, and a backlash arose that led to a rival, King's College London being established. Mindful of their delicate political position, no appointments could be agreed upon for the two key posts of Chairs of Philosophy, either of which might attract a hostile press, eager to undermine the institution for its liberal sentiments, values and ideas.

Although Thomas Southwood Smith and John Hoppus were considered for the two philosophy appointments, the posts were left vacant. George Grote, one of the promoters of London University, convinced the college that appointment of a Congregational minister such as John Hoppus would imply a religious affiliation, contrary to the institution's nondenominational principles. Grote therefore promoted his own candidate, Charles Cameron. However, Zachary Macaulay and others on the college's Council decided that the teaching of ethics had to have a religious basis (one of the emerging criticisms of the college from its detractors was that it was "an ungodly institution"). Seemingly with the agreement of Grote's two fellow promoters of the college, James Mill and Henry Brougham, and whilst Grote was absent (perhaps advisedly so if, as some claim, Jeremy Bentham supported Hoppus' candidature), the College Council recommended John Hoppus for the Chair of Philosophy – which would now become a single academic position, this being perhaps less potent to the college's critics. Grote resigned on 2 February 1830, his concept of the new institution, and the way forward, which he had mistakenly believed would be Bentham's wish, overturned. John Hoppus became the institution's first Professor of Philosophy (Professor of Logic and Mental Philosophy) in 1830; a position he held for over thirty years, until he retired as Emeritus Professor in 1866.

His succession was bitterly fought over, as had been his appointment, with some of the same protagonists; but this time Grote (who had been re-elected to the College Council in 1849) was more successful in securing the outcome he wanted (blocking the appointment of James Martineau); and Grote's wife, the writer Harriet Levin, prevailed on the college historian as the new controversy unfolded. An altogether unflattering sketch of Hoppus was entered in the college historian's pages, though his contribution has been treated more dispassionately in recent years.

== Academic life ==
John Hoppus's lectures at UCL earned the institution high acclaim. Described as "thorough and exhaustive" they covered René Descartes, Nicolas Malebranche, Baruch Spinoza, Gottfried Leibniz, Johann Gottlieb Fichte, John Locke, Christian Wolff, Friedrich Wilhelm Joseph Schelling, Immanuel Kant and post-Kantian idealists, and the ethical systems of Ralph Cudworth, Thomas Hobbes, Bernard Mandeville, Clarke, Price, Butler, Jeremy Bentham and James Mill. Several of his students went on to earn great distinction, including William Sheen (M.A. medalist in 1842), and Walter Bagehot (medalist in 1848), Richard Holt Hutton (medalist in 1849), and John Clifford(class prize, History of Philosophy, 1868).

In recognition of his academic abilities, John Hoppus was awarded a doctorate (LL.D.) from Glasgow University in 1839; and was enrolled in membership of the Royal Society the following year, where he was elected a Fellow (F.R.S.) in 1841. Much earlier, he had written a learned book on Francis Bacon's Novum Organon and scientific method, published 1827 as his first original contribution to philosophy.

== Political life ==
Hoppus was profoundly interested in ideas of popular education and took a prominent part in the controversy in 1847, seeking establishing of a national educational system to build on the work of the ragged schools or charity schools, and of the Sunday school movement, voluntary bodies that had initiated educational provision for the working classes in the large industrial cities. Hoppus firmly advocated a role for the government in the provision of education – a view then unpopular amongst many in his Dissenting circles who viewed potential government control with suspicion, having been excluded from state education by governments for so long. Though unsuccessful at the time, some twenty years later Hoppus's arguments won the day, and his belief that "no child... be excluded from instruction through the parents' poverty" came to fruition after the renewed campaign by him and others in the 1860s, which led to the Elementary Education Act 1870.

Hoppus worked for the abolition of slavery. He chaired the Board of Congregational Ministers in 1830 when it passed the following anti-slavery resolution: "That it is the fixed a unanimous opinion of this meeting that of all the rights common to man, those of the person are the most sacred and inviolable; that therefore a state of slavery is a positive, entire, and extreme evil, the nature of which cannot be altered by any meliorating circumstances; that it is, in its mildest forms, destructive of human life, social intercourse, moral character, and intellectual advancement... that this body have always sympathised with the exertions made to abate and abolish this enormous evil..."

Hoppus's other political interest lay in animal welfare; a number of disparate groups collected under this banner in the 1830s, amongst which he supported the Rational Humanity campaigners.

== Death and memorial ==
Hoppus died in London in 1875, and was interred at Abney Park Cemetery, Stoke Newington, north London. His memorial stone stands there today in Watts' Walk.

== Selected works and further reading ==
- Anon (1875) "Obituary: Dr John Hoppus F.R.S." in 'Evangelical Magazine', p. 281
- Hoppus, John, (1847). The Crisis of Popular Education: its statistics and relation to the Government"
- Hoppus, John, (1836). The Continent in 1835: sketches in Belgium, Germany, Switzerland, Savoy, and France including historical notices; and statements relative to the existing aspect of the Protestant religion in those countries
- Hoppus, John, (1856). Memorials of a Wife: dedicated By her husband to their children
- Hoppus, John (1827). An Account of Lord Bacon's Novum Organon Scientiarum; Or, new method of studying the sciences (now an Elibron Classics reprint)
- Hicks, Professor George Dawes (1927/8) History of Dept of Philosophy, UCL, Hicks, George Dawes "History of the College, Department of Philosophy archive manuscript version" UCL Mem IIA/21
