= James Pattison (London MP) =

British Member of Parliament (1786–1849)

James Pattison (1786 – 14 July 1849) was a Liberal Party politician in England. He sat in the House of Commons between 1835 and 1849.

A member of the Worshipful Company of Spectacle Makers, he was elected at the 1835 general election as one of the four Members of Parliament (MPs) for the City of London, and re-elected in 1837, but defeated at the 1841 general election. He was returned to the Commons two years later, for the same constituency, when he won a by-election in October 1843 following the death of the long-serving Liberal MP Sir Matthew Wood, Bt. He was re-elected in 1847, and held the seat until his death in July 1849, aged 63, at Molesey Grove, near Hampton Court.

Parliament of the United Kingdom
Preceded by George Lyall; William Crawford; Sir Matthew Wood; George Grote	Member of Parliament for the City of London; 1835–1841; With: William Crawford; Sir Matthew Wood; George Grote	Succeeded by George Lyall; John Masterman; Lord John Russell; Sir Matthew Wood, Bt
Preceded by Sir Matthew Wood, Bt; George Lyall; John Masterman; Lord John Russell	Member of Parliament for the City of London; 1843–1849; With: George Lyall to 1847; John Masterman 1841–57; Lord John Russell 1841–61; Baron Lionel de Rothschild from 1847	Succeeded by Sir James Duke, Bt; Lord John Russell; Baron Lionel de Rothschild; John Masterman
