= Henry Ray Freshfield =

English lawyer and conservationist

Henry Ray Freshfield (2 February 1814 – 8 February 1895) was an English lawyer and conservationist.

Freshfield was the fourth and youngest son of James William Freshfield and his wife Mary Blacket and was born at Lothbury. His father was a lawyer who established the firm of Freshfields. The family moved to Abney House on Stoke Newington Church Street in the village of that name, then a few miles distant from the City of London.

Henry Freshfield was educated at Charterhouse School from 1824 to 1829. He became a solicitor with the family firm in 1838. He lived at Hampstead, another suburban village beginning to be encroached upon by the growing metropolis, where he participated in a long and successful struggle to rescue Hampstead Heath from landlords and builders.

Freshfield was solicitor to the Bank of England from 1857 to 1877, succeeding his brother Charles Freshfield. He became very prosperous. In 1874 he acquired Kidbrooke Park, East Grinstead, an 18th-century house with 200 acres (0.81 km^{2}). He took an active part in local affairs; he was Justice of the Peace for Sussex and presented the village of Forest Row with its village hall. He was High Sheriff for the County in 1885. As at Hampstead, he was interested in the preservation of open spaces for the people, and was closely involved in the proceedings which led to Ashdown Forest being placed in the hands of conservators charged with preserving the rights of commoners and the public.

Freshfield married Jane Quinton Crawford on 1 October 1840. She was the daughter of William Crawford, MP for the City of London (1822-1841), who had made a fortune in the British East India Company. She was an author and her publications included "Alpine Byways" and "A Tour of the Grisons" (the Swiss Alps now known as Graubünden). Their son Douglas William Freshfield became a mountaineer and travel writer.
