= Matt Woods =

Matt Woods may refer to:

- Matt Woods (footballer, born 1931) (1931–2014), English footballer
- Matt Woods (footballer, born 1976), English footballer
- Matt Woods (politician) (born 1982), American politician from Alabama
