= William Crawford (London MP) =

British Liberal Party politician (1780-1843)

William Crawford (5 May 1780 – 27 April 1843) was a British Liberal Party politician who represented the City of London in the 19th century.

Crawford was born in London to Andrew Crawford (1745–1800), formerly of Dunfermline, and his wife Mary, one of 21 daughters of the Spink family living near Northallerton, Yorkshire. The family lived at Brighton from 1783, where Andrew Crawford was Postmaster of Brighton (then "Brighthelmston").

William Crawford spent his early career with the Honourable East India Company and made a fortune in India. He returned to England in around 1812, and was a partner in the East India Mercantile House (i.e. trading company) of Crawford, Colvin and Company. (See the Colvin family for more on the Anglo-Indian links.) He bought the estate of Pippbrook, near Dorking, Surrey in 1817 and made it his country home. From 1824 until his death, Crawford was a director of the Australian Agricultural Company. In 1827 he was High Sheriff of Surrey.

He had a house at Eaton Square, in the fashionable West End of London. He was a director of the Alliance Assurance Company and an alderman of the City of London in the Spectacle Makers' Company. In 1832 he stood unsuccessfully for parliament at Brighton at the general election in 1832, the first after the Reform Act. He was returned as Member of Parliament for the City of London in August 1833, and sat until he lost the seat in the Tory swing of June 1841. He was in favour of the abolition of the window tax and opposed the Corn Laws and short parliaments. He died at Woodmansterne, Surrey and was buried in St Peter's Church there.

Crawford married Dorothy Elizabeth Rees at Bombay on 11 January 1802. Five children were born in Bombay, and three in England. His son Robert Wigram Crawford was also MP for the City of London. His daughter Jane married Henry Ray Freshfield, and as Jane Freshfield wrote travelogues about mountaineering in the Swiss Alps.

Parliament of the United Kingdom
Preceded by Sir John Key, Bt; George Grote; George Lyall; Matthew Wood	Member of Parliament for City of London; 1833 – 1841; With: George Grote 1832–41; George Lyall 1833–35; James Pattison 1835–41; Matthew Wood 1817–43	Succeeded by Lord John Russell; George Lyall; John Masterman; Sir Matthew Wood, Bt
