= Jane Freshfield =

English climber and travel writer

- Born: Jane Quentin Crawford; 5 July 1814; Patcham, Sussex, England
- Died: 16 March 1901 (aged 86); East Grinstead, Sussex, England
- Occupations: Climber, travel writer
- Known for: Exploring the Swiss Alps
- Spouse: Henry Ray Freshfield
- Children: Douglas Freshfield
- Parent: William Crawford

Jane Freshfield (née Jane Quentin Crawford, publishing as "A Lady" and as Mrs Henry Freshfield; 5 July 1814 – 16 March 1901) was an English climber and travel writer. She was among the first British women to explore the Swiss Alps and encouraged others to do so.

== Life ==
Jane Quentin Crawford was born 5 July 1814. She was the daughter of William Crawford, MP for the City of London (1822-1841), who had made a fortune in the British East India Company. Her brother was Robert Wigram Crawford, also an MP.

In 1840, she married Henry Ray Freshfield (1814-1895). Their son Douglas Freshfield (1845-1934) was the editor of Alpine Journal and president of the Alpine Club.

The couple brought up their son with an appreciation of nature and the arts. From an early age they took him on journeys which included the English Lake District and Scotland. From the mid-1850s the family took yearly summer holidays in Switzerland, particularly the Alps. In old age, her son described the holidays they had taken together:

I think that, without any interruption, for the following ten years, I went each August to the Alps with my parents, and I experienced not only the easy trips, but also many less usual destinations. We toured the Monte Bianco, the Monte Rosa and the Bernina Range; we went to Arolla, to Evolene, to Cogne, in Val Formazza, in the Glarus Alps, to Davos, to Livigno and in the Vorderrhein. Some maps I drew still show our yearly itineraries. We climbed Mount Titlis, the Jazzi Peak, the Mittelhorn, and some other peaks of moderate height.

Valeria Azzolini wrote about her in I resoconti di viaggio di Freshfield ("Freshfield's Travel Journals"):

Lover of the mountain in the youngest and truest sense, hurry was unknown to her because it wasn't really reaching the top which insterested her, but the captivation of the landscapes she encountered on the path, and thus the hours she spent in that enjoyment.
Apart from the members of the family, there was another protagonist in Mrs Freshfield's narrations: the guide, Michel Alphonse Couttet. And it was surely in those years that the young Freshfield understood the importance, in every mountain action, of the presence of a good guide.

== Publications ==
- Alpine byways, or, Light leaves gathered in 1859 and 1860 / by a Lady (1861 London: Longman, Green, Longman, and Roberts)

- Italian translation published 2010 as Itinerari alpini meno conosciuti, ovvero, Foglie delicate raccolte nel 1859 e nel 1860 da una signora (Aosta : Art Point (libr. antiquaria))

- A summer tour in the Grisons and Italian valleys of the Bernina / by Mrs. Henry Freshfield, author of 'Alpine byways (1862, London: Longman, Green, Longman, and Roberts)

The Grisons are the Swiss Alps now known as Graubünden.
