= William Lyall (priest) =

English churchman (1788-1857)

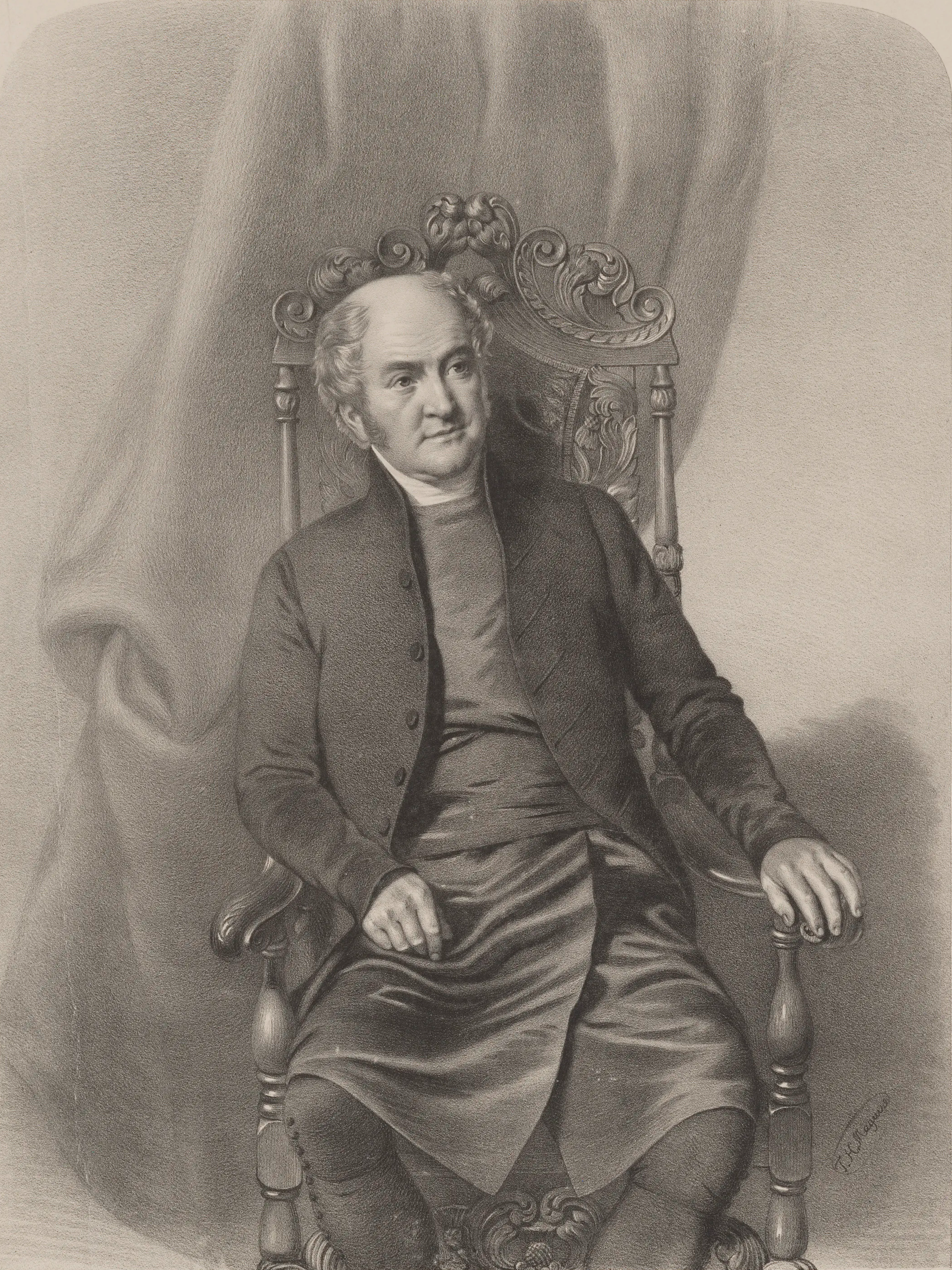
Lithograph by Thomas Herbert Maguire after William Buckler

William Rowe Lyall (11 February 1788 – 17 February 1857) was an English churchman, Dean of Canterbury from 1845 to 1857.

== Life ==
He was born in Stepney, Middlesex, the fifth son of John Lyall and Jane Comyn. He was educated at Trinity College, Cambridge (M.A. 1816). In 1817 he married Catherine Brandreth (1792–1863), daughter of Dr. Brandreth of Liverpool.

Lyall was editor of the British Critic 1816–17 and associated with the Hackney Phalanx, the high-church group. Together with Hugh James Rose he became editor of the Rivington's Theological Library (1832–46). He early recognized a Catholic tendency in John Henry Newman's writing. His appointment as Warburton Lecturer led to a major work, Propædia Prophetica (1840). Lyall's abilities and potential came to the attention of William Howley, the Archbishop of Canterbury, who shaped his career.

Lyall became Archdeacon of Colchester (1824–1842), Archdeacon of Maidstone (1842–1845), simultaneously Canon of the Ninth Prebend, Canterbury Cathedral (1841–1845), and finally Dean of Canterbury (1845–1857). He died at Canterbury, Kent. There is a monumental tomb in the north aisle of the nave at Canterbury, said to be designed after a model by the sculptor John Birnie Philip (1824–1875), but his remains are in fact buried at the parish church of St Michael in the nearby village of Harbledown, alongside his wife's.

== Literary works ==
He wrote a number of dissertations on religious topics, and was a regular contributor to the Quarterly Review, albeit anonymously. His major published work was Propædia Prophetica (Preparation of Prophesy), in 1840. It was re-published in 1854 and again posthumously in 1885, this time with a preface by his nephew George C. Pearson. He also contributed to the Encyclopædia Metropolitana, an ambitious enterprise to disseminate knowledge: he was invited to write sections of the History Division, in particular: History of Greece, Macedonia and Syria. Co-authors of this work were Jacob Henry Brooke Mountain, George Cecil Renouard and Michael Russell.

== Family ==
Catharine Brandreth

His eldest brother was George Lyall, Snr, sometime MP for the City of London (UK Parliament constituency), and Chairman of the East India Company. One of his famous nephews was Alfred Comyn Lyall, the Indian civil servant (1835–1911). Another was James Broadwood Lyall (1838–1916), also an Indian civil servant, who became Governor of the Punjab.

== Notes ==
Church of England titles
Preceded by Inaugural incumbent	Archdeacon of Maidstone; 1841–1845	Succeeded by Benjamin Harrison
Preceded by Richard Bagot	Dean of Canterbury; 1845–1857	Succeeded by Henry Alford
