= Thomas Stewardson =

British portrait painter

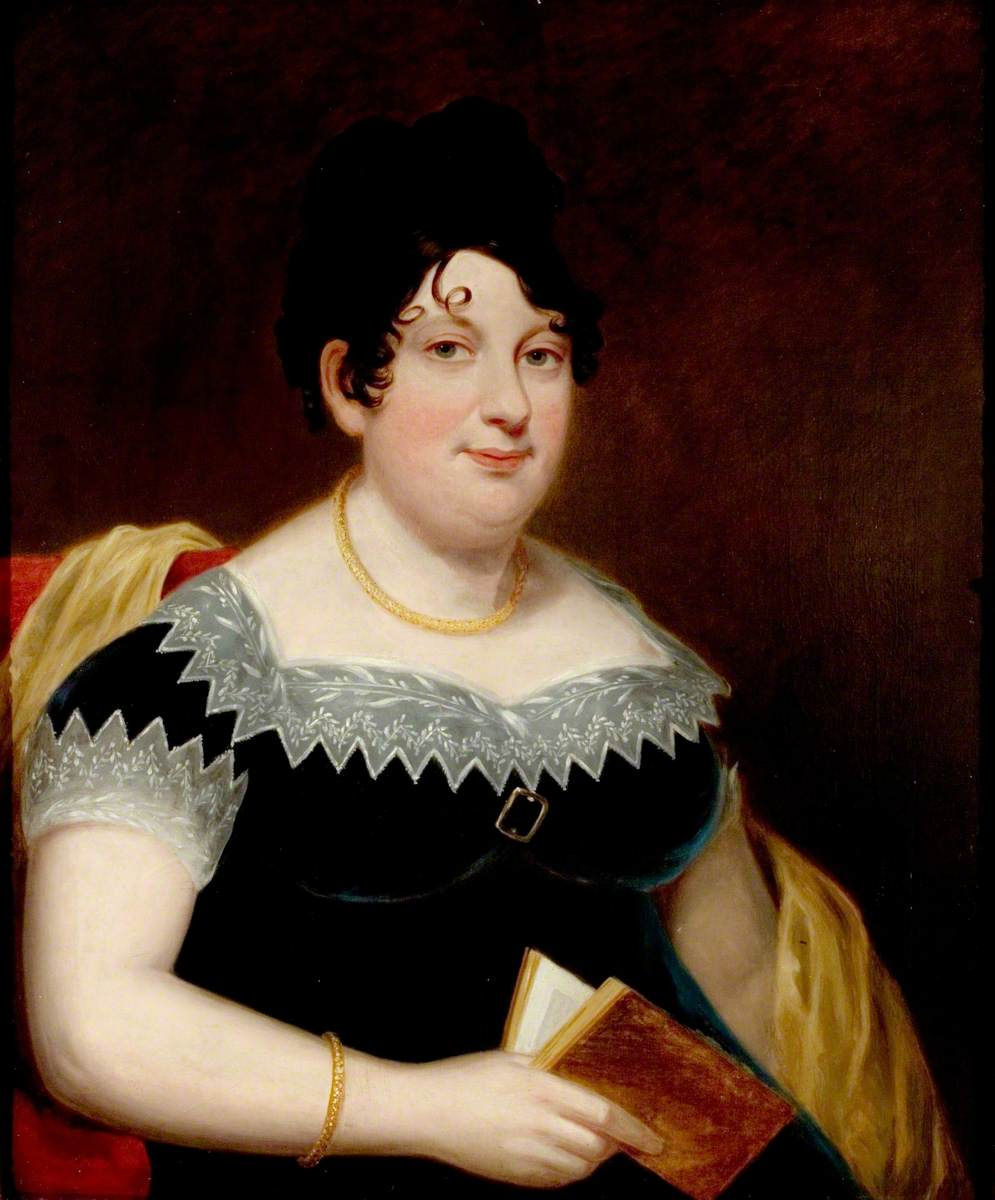
Portrait of Catherine Gordon, Lord Byron's mother, by Stewardson

Thomas Stewardson (August 1781 – 1859) was a British portrait painter.

Stewardson was born at Kendal in August 1781, the son of John and Anne Stewardson, who were from a Quaker family at Ullsmoor, near Shap in Westmoreland.

He is buried at Kensal Green Cemetery, London.

== Literary references ==
Letitia Elizabeth Landon produced the poem "Portrait of a Girl, in the British Gallery, by T. Stewardson" as part of her Poetical Catalogue of Pictures in the Literary gazette, 1823. This is probably Stewardson's "Portrait of a Girl" (traditionally identified as Lady Catherine Powlett, Countess of Darlington). She also includes a poem on " A Child Screening a Dove from a Hawk." in her Poetical Sketches of Modern Pictures within her 1825 collection, The Troubadour.
