= Cima di Jazzi =

Mountain in Valais, Switzerland and Piedmont, Italy

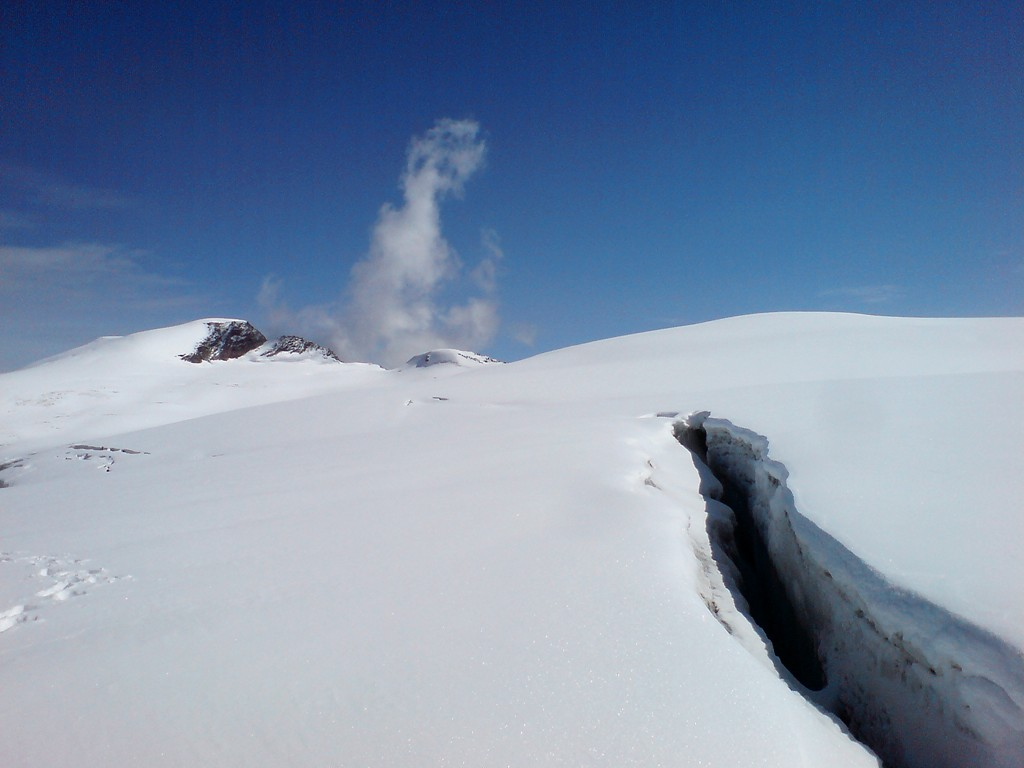
- Cima di Jazzi (left) from west

Highest point
- Elevation: 3,792 m (12,441 ft)
- Prominence: 241 m (791 ft)
- Parent peak: Monte Rosa
- Coordinates: 45°58′51.9″N 7°53′40.9″E

Geography
- Location within Alps
- Location: Valais, Switzerland; Piedmont, Italy
- Parent range: Pennine Alps

The Cima di Jazzi (English: Jazzi Peak) is a mountain of the Pennine Alps, located on the Swiss-Italian border, just north of Monte Rosa. It overlooks Macugnaga on its east (Italian) side. The west (Swiss) side is entirely covered by glaciers.

Cima di Jazzi is a snow cap, the peak of the Weissgrats located north of the Y-shaped mountain rock corset. Jazzi is a common name in the Valais Alps and actually means ''mountain pasture''.

== Geography ==
The SOIUSA partition of the Alps places the mountain in the Monte Rosa group of the alpine subsection Eastern Aosta and Northern Valsesia Alps (Pennine Alps); its code is: I/B-9.III-A.3.a.

== Mountain huts ==
- Rifugio Eugenio Sella,
- Bivacco Città di Luino,
- Monte Rosa Hütte.
