= George Lyall (1779–1853) =

British businessman & politician (1779–1853)

- Born: c. 1779
- Died: 1 September 1853
- Occupation: Politician

George Lyall (1779 – 1 September 1853) was an English merchant and politician, Chairman of the Honourable East India Company for periods 1841–3 and 1844–6.

== Life ==
Lyall was the eldest son of John Lyall, a merchant and shipowner, and his wife Jane Comyn; Alfred Lyall and William Rowe Lyall were brothers.

He had a range of other business interests involving shipping. In 1825 he was a director of the New Zealand Company, a venture chaired by the wealthy John George Lambton, Whig MP (and later 1st Earl of Durham), that made the first attempt to colonise New Zealand.

He served as a Conservative member of parliament (MP) for the City of London from 1833 to 1835 and again from 1841 to 1847. He died in Park Crescent, Middlesex, present-day London.

== Family ==
Lyall was married, and with his wife Mary Ann née Edwardes had two sons and two daughters. Their son George Lyall, Jnr was Member of Parliament for Whitehaven. The other son, John Edwardes Lyall, became Advocate-General of Bengal. Their daughter Mary married William Forsyth QC.

Parliament of the United Kingdom
Preceded by Robert Waithman; George Grote; Sir Matthew Wood; Sir John Key, Bt	Member of Parliament for City of London; Feb. 1833–1835; With: Sir Matthew Wood; George Grote; Sir John Key, Bt to August 1833; William Crawford from August 1833	Succeeded by Sir Matthew Wood; William Crawford; James Pattison; George Grote
Preceded by Sir Matthew Wood; William Crawford; James Pattison; George Grote	Member of Parliament for City of London; 1841–1847; With: John Masterman to 1857; Sir Matthew Wood to 1843; Lord John Russell to 1861; James Pattison from 1843	Succeeded by Lord John Russell; James Pattison; John Masterman; Baron Lionel de Rothschild
