= Sir Matthew Wood, 4th Baronet =

English cricketer

Personal information
- Full name: Matthew Wood
- Born: 21 September 1857; Newport, Isle of Wight, England
- Died: 13 July 1908 (aged 50); Kensington, London, England
- Batting: Right-handed
- Bowling: Unknown-arm underarm slow

Domestic team information
- Years: Team
- 1876: Hampshire

Career statistics
Competition	First-class
Matches	1
Runs scored	0
Batting average	0.00
100s/50s	–/–
Top score	0
Catches/stumpings	–/–
- Source: Cricinfo, 23 December 2013

Sir Matthew Wood, 4th Baronet (29 September 1857 – 13 July 1908) was an English first-class cricketer. Wood was a right-handed batsman who was an underarm slow bowler, though with which arm he bowled with is unknown.

The son of Sir Francis Wood the 3rd Baronet of the Page Wood baronets, and Louisa Mary Hodgson, Wood was born at Newport on the Isle of Wight. He was educated at Winchester College. He would make a single appearance in first-class cricket for Hampshire against Derbyshire in 1876 at the County Ground, Derby. In a match which Derbyshire won by 8 wickets, Wood was twice dismissed for a duck, by John Platts in Hampshire's first-innings and by William Hickton in their second-innings.

He succeeded his father as the 4th Baronet on 21 April 1868. He later married a Maud Mary Brown on 31 July 1894. Wood died at Kensington, London on 13 July 1908. As he died without issue, he was succeeded as the 5th Baronet by his brother Sir John Page Wood.

Baronetage of the United Kingdom
Preceded by Sir Francis Wood	Baronet (of Hatherley House); 1868–1908	Succeeded by Sir John Page Wood
