= Emma Barrett-Lennard =

British songwriter and novelist

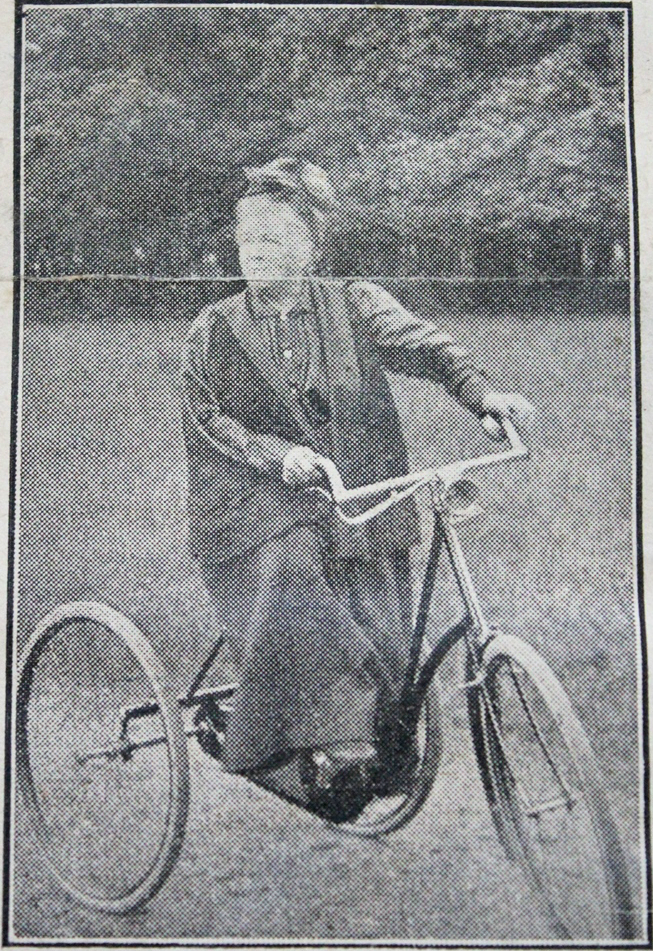
- Born: 1832
- Baptised: 17 February 1832
- Died: 8 June 1916 (aged 83–84)
- Occupation: Songwriter, novelist
- Spouse(s): Sir Thomas Barrett-Lennard, 2nd Bt.
- Children: 8
- Parent(s): John Page Wood; Emma Caroline Wood
- Family: Katharine O'Shea, Anna Caroline Wood, Evelyn Wood

Emma, Lady Barrett-Lennard (1832 – 8 June 1916) was a British songwriter and novelist.

She was born Emma Wood in 1832, the daughter of the Rev. John Page Wood and Emma Caroline Wood, daughter of Admiral Sampson Michell. Her siblings included Katharine O'Shea, Field Marshal Sir Henry Evelyn Wood, and novelist Anna Caroline Steele. In 1853, she married Sir Thomas Barrett-Lennard, 2nd Baronet. They had five daughters and three sons.

Emma Barrett-Lennard was a prolific songwriter. "Plymouth Hoe" and the patriotic song "Canadian Guns" were her two most famous works. She also set a number of literary works to music, including works by her mother and sister, Alfred Lord Tennyson, and others. She also wrote one novel, Constance Rivers. Lady Barrett-Lennard died on 8 June 1916.

== Bibliography ==
- Constance Rivers. 3 vol. London: Hurst and Blackett, 1867.
