= Evelyn Wood (British Army officer) =

British Army officer (1838–1919)

Field Marshal Sir Evelyn Wood VC GCB GCMG DL
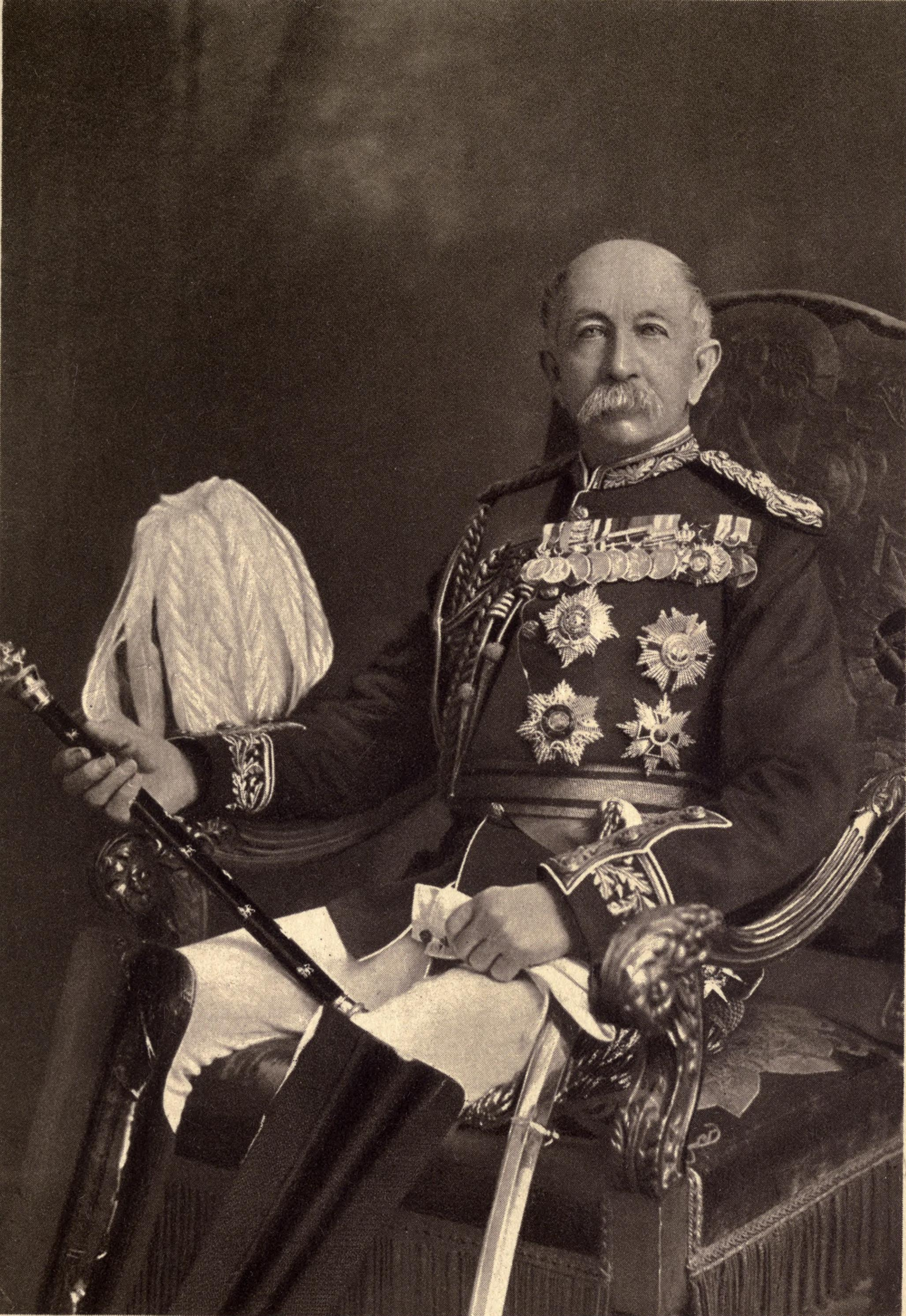
- Born: 9 February 1838; Cressing, Essex
- Died: 2 December 1919 (aged 81); Harlow, Essex
- Military career
- Allegiance: United Kingdom
- Branch: Royal Navy (1852–1855); British Army (1855–1905); Egyptian Army (1882–1885)
- Service years: 1854–1905
- Rank: Field Marshal
- Commands: Eastern District; Aldershot Command; Quartermaster-General to the Forces; Adjutant General; II Army Corps
- Conflicts: Crimean War; Indian Mutiny; Third Anglo-Ashanti War; Anglo-Zulu War; First Boer War; Mahdist War
- Awards: Victoria Cross; Knight Grand Cross of the Order of the Bath; Knight Grand Cross of the Order of St Michael and St George; Mentioned in Despatches
- Other work: Constable of the Tower of London

Field Marshal Sir Henry Evelyn Wood, VC, GCB, GCMG, DL (9 February 1838 – 2 December 1919) was a British Army officer. After an early career in the Royal Navy, Wood joined the British Army in 1855. He served in several major conflicts including the Indian Mutiny where, as a lieutenant, he was awarded the Victoria Cross, the highest award for valour in the face of the enemy that is awarded to British and Imperial forces, for rescuing a local merchant from a band of robbers who had taken their captive into the jungle, where they intended to hang him. Wood further served as a commander in several other conflicts, notably the Third Anglo-Ashanti War, the Anglo-Zulu War, the First Boer War and the Mahdist War. His service in Egypt led to his appointment as Sirdar where he reorganised the Egyptian Army. He returned to Britain to serve as General Officer Commanding-in-Chief Aldershot Command from 1889, as Quartermaster-General to the Forces from 1893 and as Adjutant General from 1897. His last appointment was as commander of 2nd Army Corps (later renamed Southern Command) from 1901 to 1904.

== Ancestry and early life ==
Wood was born at Cressing near Braintree, Essex as the fifth and youngest son of the Reverend Sir John Page Wood, 2nd Baronet (1796–1866), a clergyman, and Emma Caroline Michell, sister of Charles Collier Michell and Admiral Frederick Thomas Michell, and daughter of Admiral Sampson Michell. Wood was an elder brother of Katherine Parnell (Kitty O'Shea). Sir Matthew Wood, 1st Baronet, was his grandfather and Lord Chancellor William Wood, 1st Baron Hatherley was an uncle. His maternal grandfather (Sampson Mitchell) had been an admiral in the Portuguese navy. One of his mother's brothers was a British admiral, another rose to be Surveyor-General of Cape Colony. Wood was educated at Marlborough Grammar School (1847–9) and Marlborough College (1849–52), but ran away after an unjust beating.

== Early military career ==
=== Crimean War: from sailor to soldier ===
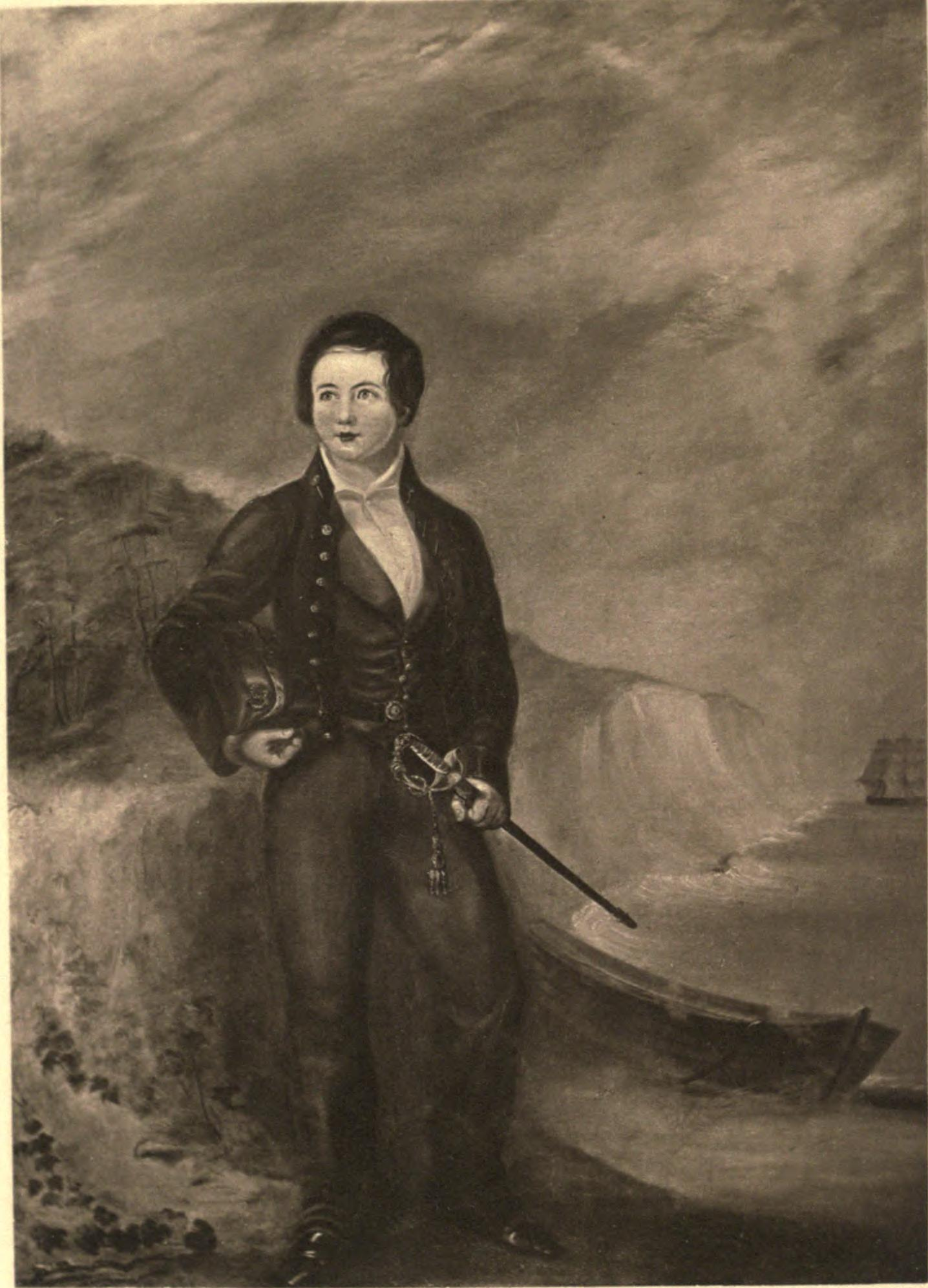
Wood in 1852 when in the Royal Navy (from a painting by Lady Wood)

Like his near contemporary John French, Wood began his career in the Royal Navy, serving under his uncle Captain Frederick Mitchell on HMS Queen, but vertigo stopped him going aloft. He became a midshipman on 15 April 1852.

Wood served in the Crimean War during the siege of Sebastopol, in Captain William Peel's 1,400 strong naval brigade, whose job was to man some guns on a ridge opposite Sebastopol. He was at Inkerman and aged 16, was Peel's aide de camp in the assault on the Redan on 18 June 1855, having risen from his sickbed to join the attack. He was seriously wounded and almost lost his left arm, which doctors wanted to amputate. Wood was mentioned in despatches and received his first, but unsuccessful, recommendation for a VC.

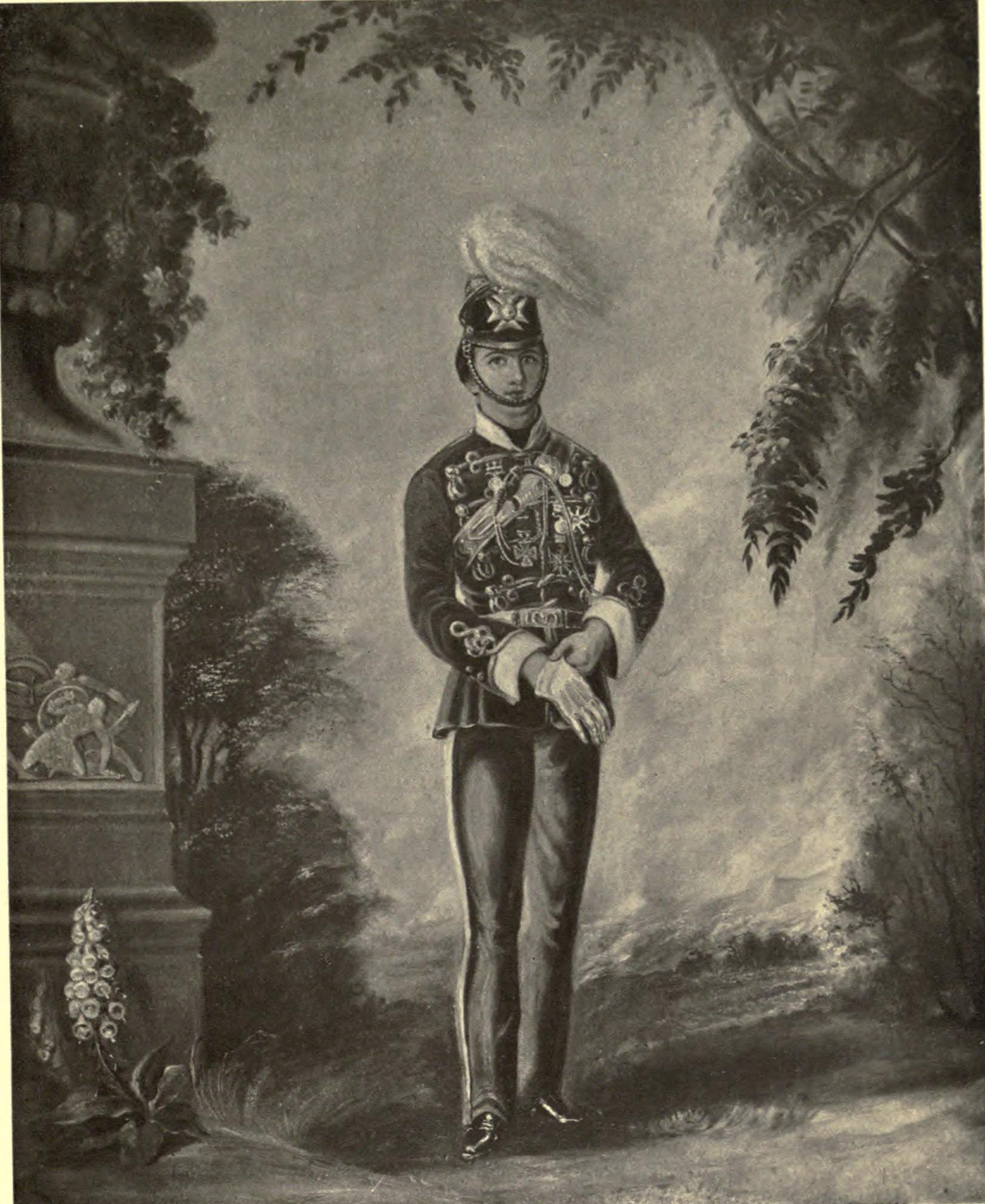
Cornet Wood, 1855

Invalided home with a letter of recommendation from Lord Raglan, written five days before the latter's death, Wood left the Royal Navy to join the British Army, becoming a cornet (without purchase) in the 13th Light Dragoons on 7 September 1855 and reporting to their depot with his arm still in a sling. He had only £250 (equivalent to £23,000 in 2025) a year in private income, rather than the £400 (equivalent to £37,000 in 2025) needed, and was soon in debt.

Wood returned to the Crimean Theatre (January 1856). His promotion to lieutenant, which his uncle had paid for, took effect on 1 February 1856. However, within a month he was in hospital at Scutari with pneumonia and typhoid. His parents were told he was dying, so his mother arrived on 20 March 1856 only to find one of Florence Nightingale's nurses striking him. He was so emaciated that his hip bones were poking through his skin. Against medical advice he was brought home to England to recover.

=== Indian Mutiny ===
Wood served in Ireland then transferred as a lieutenant to the 17th Lancers on 9 October 1857. His transfer was to gain passage to India; he had considered joining the French Foreign Legion. He reached Bombay on 21 December 1858. While out hunting he was attacked by a wounded tiger – it was shot in the nick of time by a hunting companion; – he also rode a giraffe belonging to a friendly Indian prince to win a bet with a brother officer – he stayed on long enough to win the bet, but was trampled badly, the animal's rear hoof breaking through both cheeks, crushing his nose.

In India, Wood saw action at Rajghur, Sindwaho, Kharee, and Barode during the Indian Mutiny. From May 1858 to October 1859 he was brigade major to a flying column in Central India. On 19 October 1858 during an action at Sindwaho while in command of a troop of light cavalry, twenty-year-old Lieutenant Wood attacked a body of rebels, whom he routed almost single-handedly. Wood also saw action at Kurai (25 October 1859). At Sindhora, on 29 December 1858, Wood's force of 10 men routed 80 men. With the help of a daffadar and a sowar of Beatson's Horse, he rescued a local Potail (headman of a village) from a band of robbers who had taken their captive into the jungle, where they had intended to hang him. For these two acts of selfless bravery, Wood was awarded the Victoria Cross.

His citation read:

For having, on the 19th of October, 1858, during Action at Sindwaho, when in command of a Troop of the 3rd Light Cavalry, attacked with much gallantry, almost single handed, a body of Rebels who had made a stand, whom he routed. Also, for having subsequently, near Siudhora, gallantly advanced with a Duffadar and Sowar of Beatson's Horse, and rescued from a band of robbers, a Potail, Chemmum Singh, whom they had captured and carried off to the Jungles, where they intended to hang him.

He became temporarily deaf for a week while studying Hindustani at Poona, which he attributed at the time to overwork. In December 1859 he joined the 2nd Central India Horse, whose main function was the suppression of banditry. In this role he had to deal with an incipient mutiny and sort out the regimental accounts. He was invalided back to Britain in November 1860 with fever, sunstroke and ear problems.

=== Staff College ===
On 16 April 1861, Wood was promoted to captain. His captaincy cost him £1,000 official payment to the government and £1,500 "over regulation" to buy out his predecessor. He was promoted again this time to brevet major (for services in India) on 19 August 1862.

Wood passed the exam to enter the new Staff College, Camberley, but another officer from 17th Lancers had higher marks and as at that time only one officer was permitted from each regiment each year, Wood had to transfer as a captain to the 73rd (Perthshire) Regiment of Foot on 21 October 1862. He took up his place in January 1863, and graduated in 1864. While at Staff College he took part in boxing lessons.

In Dublin, from January 1865 to March 1866 he was aide-de-camp to General William Napier, whom he knew from India; the damp climate brought on a recurrence of fever and ear trouble. In the autumn of 1865 the 73rd were ordered to Hong Kong, but Wood disliked the new commanding officer so much that he paid £500 to transfer into the 17th (Leicestershire) Regiment of Foot.

From July 1866 to November 1871 he was at North Camp at Aldershot, first as brigade major then as Deputy Assistant Quartermaster-General. Having just written to propose to his future wife, he read in 1867 that "General Napier" was to lead an expedition to Abyssinia; he packed his bags and went to London to volunteer, but then learnt that this was not to be William Napier, but General Robert Napier, whom he did not know and who was unlikely to grant him a staff position. With a young family to support but not hopeful of getting a staff position, Wood also studied law, enrolling at the Middle Temple on 30 April 1870.

On 22 June 1870 Wood was given an unattached majority. In the summer of 1871 he paid £2,000 (equivalent to £204,000 in 2025) to purchase a permanent majority in the 90th Light Infantry, effective 28 October 1871 and one of the last such transactions before the purchase of commissions system was abolished.

Nursing his children through diphtheria (he had sent his pregnant wife away), he was prescribed morphine for insomnia and nearly died of an overdose. Wood was promoted to brevet lieutenant colonel on 19 June 1873 on the basis of seniority from the purchase of his majority.

== Imperial wars ==
=== Third Ashanti War ===
In May 1873, with the Third Anglo-Ashanti War brewing, he met Wolseley by chance in the War Office and joked that his naval experience might come in handy for West African waterways. On 12 September 1873 he was appointed to Wolseley's staff for special services. He commanded a flank at the Battle of Amoaful (31 January 1874) where he was wounded. (Note: Beckett 2004 gives the date as 30 January) and at the Battle of Esaman. He helped recruit a regiment from among the coastal African tribes, although he wrote of the Fantis that "it would be difficult to imagine a more cowardly, useless lot of men". He did, however, discourage British officers from using physical abuse on them.

He was wounded just above the heart, confining him to a stretcher for a day. Relying on chlorodyne and laudanum to keep going, he was ordered to lead the sick and wounded back to the coast. It was erroneously reported in the London press that he had been captured and probably flayed alive. He was appointed a Companion of the Order of the Bath (CB) on 31 March 1874.

Wood presented two African chieftains with a walking stick, a hat and an umbrella. Twenty-two years later, later his eldest son was also in Ashanti. While there, he saw a native carrying a stick which the man would not sell, saying it belonged to his chief. On closer inspection, Wood Junior read an inscription; 'Presented to Chief Andoo by Colonel Evelyn Wood, 1874.' He was promoted in permanent rank from major and brevet lieutenant-colonel to brevet colonel on 1 April 1874. A man of relatively modest means for much of his life, Wood took his profession very seriously – like many who had served under Garnet Wolseley in the Ashanti War he was a member of the reforming "Wolseley ring", although the two men were never on particularly good terms.

Wood completed his legal studies and was called to the Bar at the Middle Temple on 30 April 1874. (Note: None of the works consulted for this article make mention of him ever actually practising as a barrister, presumably as his army career took off from this time) In June 1874 he lectured about the Ashanti War at the Royal United Services Institute. From September 1874 to February 1878 he was at Aldershot, first as Superintendent of Garrison Instruction, then as Assistant Quartermaster-General. In 1877 he declined command of Staff College, recommending George Colley, who also declined.

=== Zulu War ===
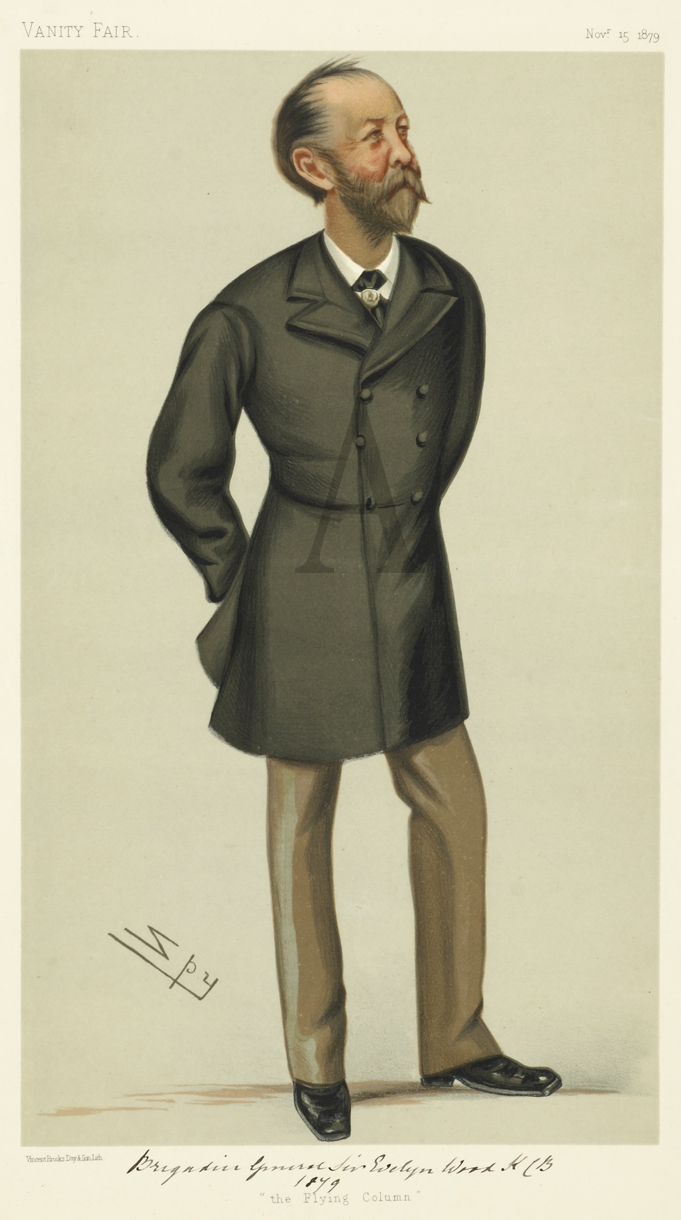
Wood by Spy in Vanity Fair, 1879

Wood was on the staff of Lieutenant-General Thesiger (who later became Lord Chelmsford), who was then in command of a column in Natal in the Xhosa Wars (also known as the Cape Frontier Wars). He was employed as a field officer of the 90th Light Infantry, which had arrived in South Africa in January 1878, in the last battle of the wars at Tutu Bush (May 1878). On 13 November he was promoted to the substantive rank of lieutenant-colonel, and on the same day he was appointed commanding officer of the 90th Light.

In January 1879, Wood took part in the Anglo-Zulu War and was given command of the 3,000-strong 4th column on the left flank of the army when they crossed the Zulu frontier. Defeat of other British forces at Isandlwana (22 January) would force Wood to retreat to fortified positions at Kambula. The right-wing column was besieged by the Zulus at Eshowe, leaving Wood's the only free column. Wood and Redvers Buller harassed the Zulus of the local Qulusi Clan, so the main Zulu army was diverted to fight them. Wood was defeated at Hlobane on 28 March 1879, where he had his horse shot from under him and his close friend and chief staff officer Ronald Campbell was killed. He recovered and the following day decisively beat the Zulus at Kambula (29 March 1879). He was promoted to the local rank of brigadier-general on 3 April. Wood's victory was the turning point of the war, and in May 1879, during the second invasion of Zululand, his force linked with the 2nd Division for a push on Ulundi.

At the end of the war, Wood headed the negotiations which took place on Conference Hill. The Zulus squatted round the negotiating tent in a large crescent. According to one witness, they were 'apathetic'. The tension rose when Wood emerged from the tent and ordered his band to play 'God Save the Queen'. The accompanying soldiers gave good cheer; the bandmaster was then told to play something lively. Being Irish, the master 'treated them to 'Patrick's Day in the Morning'. The effect was magical; one after another, the Zulus rose and, swaying and dancing, swarmed around the British soldiers on their horses. Of particular interest to the Zulus was the bass drummer whom they seemed to greatly admire. Their negotiations were successful. Wood and Buller both chose to return to England rather than join Wolseley in the final pursuit of the Zulu King Cetewayo. Reverting to his permanent rank of brevet colonel, Wood was also advanced to Knight Commander of the Order of the Bath (KCB) on 23 June 1879.

He visited Balmoral Castle in September 1879, and in subsequent years wrote the Queen letters described by Ian Beckett as "extraordinarily sycophantic". He was already very deaf and hardly stopped talking; the Queen herself recorded that she "hollered at him", while in the field an officer had to accompany him at night as he might not hear a sentry's challenge; his deafness came partly from his various fevers. He was also a hypochondriac, and very vain – he is said to have had his medal ribbons bordered in black so that they would be more visible.

Wood was paid £100 for a series of London newspaper articles, his first published work. He was disappointed not to be made a major-general, despite lobbying by the Queen and Wolseley. This may well have been deliberate blocking of Wolseley's proteges from promotion by the Duke of Cambridge. Wood recommended Redvers Buller for his VC after the Zulu War. On 15 December 1879 Wood took up a brigade command at Belfast, and in that role was again given the local rank of brigadier-general, this time on the staff in Ireland in December 1879.

=== First Boer War ===
On 12 January 1880 Wood was posted to command the Chatham Garrison, roughly equivalent to a brigade, holding that post until early 1881. He was again ranked from January 1880 as a local brigadier-general.

Wood's brother stood for Parliament as an "advanced" Liberal in April 1880, but he himself declined approaches to do so at least twice. Between March and July 1880 Wood and his wife were obliged by the Queen to escort the former Empress Eugenie to see the spot where her son, the Prince Imperial, had been killed while fighting with the British Army in the Zulu War, calling at St Helena (where Napoleon I had died) on the way back. To his annoyance he received no pay whatsoever for this mission, despite it being official business at the Queen's request. In October 1880 Wolseley complained of the noise, poor food and filth of Wood's home.

With the First Boer War reaching a crescendo, he was once again sent back to South Africa in January 1881, initially as a "staff colonel" to Sir George Colley, Governor and Commander-in-Chief in Natal, who was his junior on the Army list. He was then, again with the local rank of brigadier-general, appointed second-in-command, pushing reinforcements up to Colley. He succeeded Colley after his defeat and death at Majuba Hill (27 February 1881), earning promotion to the local rank of major-general.

In mid-March Wood reopened the offensive. He intended to relieve the towns under siege, but was ordered by William Gladstone's Cabinet to make peace. Wood wrote to his wife that the treaty would make him "the best abused man in England for a time" but thought it his duty to obey the government's orders. Wolseley (who thought the treaty "infamous" and "ignominious") and other officers thought he should have resigned his commission rather than sign it. Wolseley never forgave him for not avenging Colley, and he was criticised by Colley's biographer William Butler. He had to travel to Pretoria, and was injured on the way when the horses of his carriage bolted. He negotiated peace on 21 March 1881. He was offered but declined, the Governorship of Natal. In April 1881 he was appointed to a commission of inquiry into all matters relating to the future settlement of the Transvaal Territory, and put in a dissenting opinion about the boundaries.

Although the peace negotiations were an embarrassing reverse for Britain, they brought Wood further political and royal favour. The Queen thought highly of him (and Buller). Wood's third daughter, born in 1881, was named "Victoria Eugenie" at the Queen's wish. Wood had already impressed Lord Beaconsfield (Prime Minister at the time), who had met him at the Queen's suggestion after the Zulu War, and now impressed Gladstone, the current Prime Minister. He was promoted in permanent rank from lieutenant-colonel (unemployed) and brevet colonel to major-general (30 November 1881) (Note: Beckett 2004 gives the date of this promotion as 12 August 1881) and was awarded a Knight Grand Cross of the Order of St Michael and St George (GCMG) on 17 February 1882. He returned to England and to the Chatham command in February 1882.

=== Egypt and Sudan ===
In August 1882 Wood commanded the 4th Brigade on the Egyptian expedition to suppress the Urabi Revolt. Wolseley kept him on occupation duties in Alexandria, so he missed the Battle of Tel el-Kebir. He returned to Chatham for a while again in November 1882 then returned to be Sirdar (commander) of the Egyptian Army from 21 December 1882 until 1885, during which period he thoroughly reorganised it, with Francis Grenfell and Kitchener working under him. He had 25 British officers (who were given extra pay and Egyptian ranks a grade or two higher than their British ones) and a few NCOs, although to Wood's annoyance Lt-Gen Stephenson, commander of the British occupation forces, was confirmed as his senior in June 1884. During the cholera epidemic of 1883, British officers earned the respect of Egyptian soldiers by nursing them. Wood gave Sundays off from drill as well as Fridays (the Muslim holy day), so that Egyptian soldiers would see that their British officers took their own religion seriously.

Wood hoped to command the Gordon Relief Expedition (see Mahdist War), but Wolseley was given the job instead in September 1884 and sidelined him to command of the lines of communication. Wood also fell out with Earle, the commander of the river column. He commanded the British at the Battle of Ginnis in December 1885. He was the only officer to be given an important command despite advising against Wolseley's choice of the Nile route. Wood briefly took Redvers Buller's place as chief of staff as Buller had to take charge of the desert column after Stewart was mortally wounded at Abu Klea. In this job Wood became unpopular for employing female nurses (against the advice of army doctors at that time) and quarrelled with his friend Buller when Wood recommended a more cautious advance which would give time to build up supply depots. He was disorganised, stuffing telegrams into his pocket, to Wolseley's annoyance. In March 1885 Buller became chief of staff again.

By this stage Wood was so deaf that Wolseley complained he had become hoarse from shouting at him. Wolseley wrote of Wood that "he has done worse than I expected" and in his journal described him as "the vainest but by no means the ablest of men. He is as cunning as a first class female diplomatist … (but has not) real sound judgement…… intrigues with newspaper correspondents … he has not the brains nor the disposition nor the coolness nor the firmness of purpose to enable him to take command in any war … a very second rate general … whose two most remarkable traits (a)re extreme vanity & unbounded self-seeking" although a letter to his wife (complaining that Wood was "a very puzzle-headed fellow", wanting in method and vain) suggests that Wolseley still bore Wood a grudge about the peace after Majuba Hill. Ill once again, Wood handed over the job of Sirdar to Francis Grenfell. To his annoyance, he received no (British) honours from the Nile expedition. Wood returned to the UK in June 1885.

== Home commands ==
=== Aldershot ===
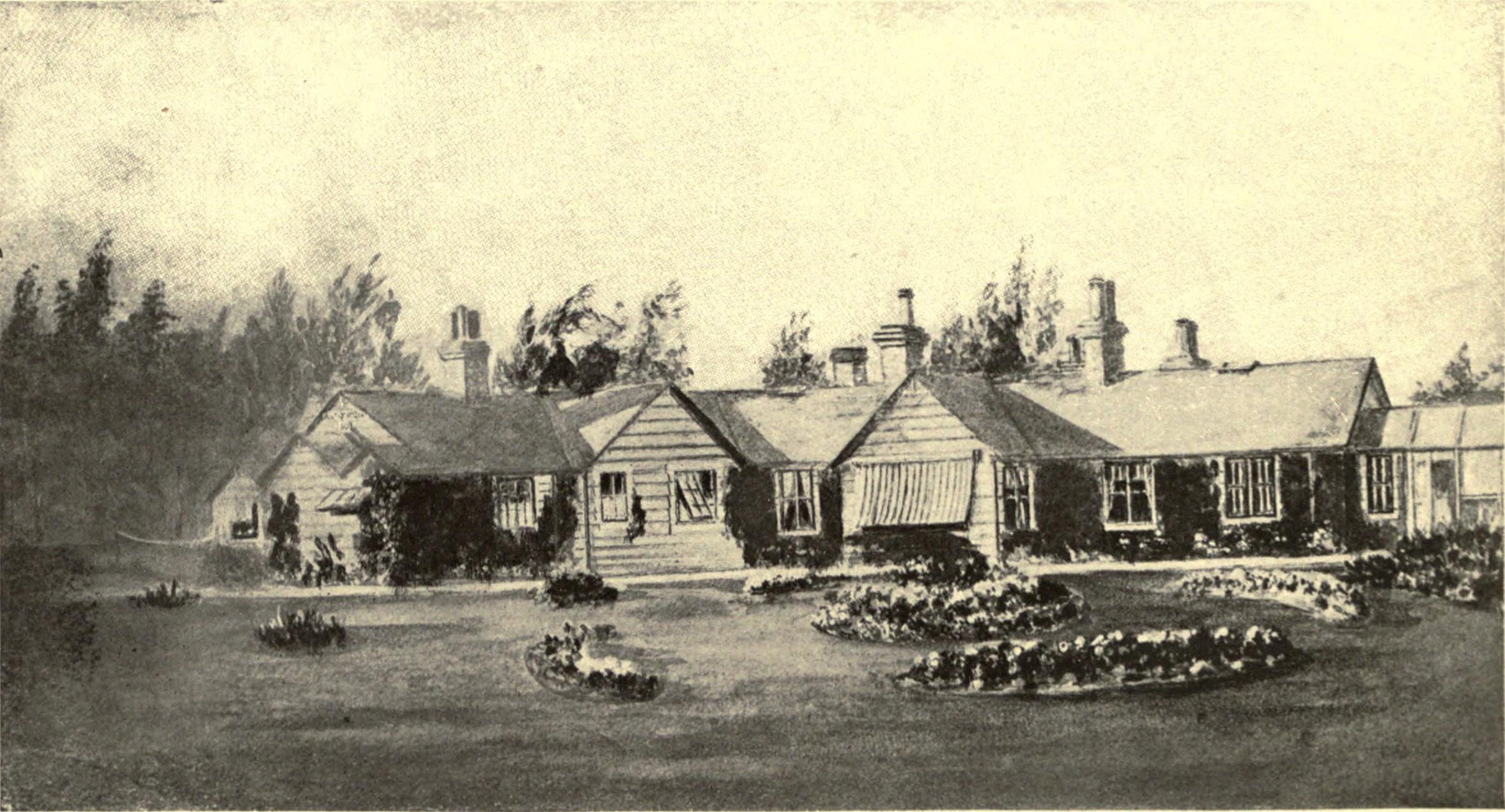
Wood's quarters in Aldershot

In 1886 Wood returned to Britain to take charge of Eastern Command at Colchester, effective 1 April 1886. In November 1888 the Duke of Cambridge (Commander-in-Chief of the Forces) opposed his mooted appointment as General Officer Commanding of Aldershot Command, one of the most important posts in the army at home, as the Woods were "a very rough couple". Despite the Duke's opposition, he was appointed GOC Aldershot on 1 January 1889. He was promoted to local lieutenant-general, as he was only tenth on the list of major-generals. He was promoted to permanent lieutenant-general (1 April 1890) and advanced to Knight Grand Cross of the Order of the Bath (GCB) on 30 May 1891. He would remain at Aldershot until 8 October 1893.

At Aldershot Wood supported the implementation of the Wantage Commission reforms to soldiers' conditions. He was concerned with the well-being of both troops and animals, recommending the rebuilding of barracks and training of army cooks. He arranged for sick men's food to be prepared in hospitals rather than brought in tins from their own units. He experimented with training soldiers on bicycles, night marches (in the teeth of opposition, particularly from the Duke of Cambridge, who thought it might interfere with horses' rest) and negotiated with the railway companies for cheap rail tickets for soldiers going on leave. He also carried out extensive training manoeuvres for the regulars under his command and for Militia and Volunteer forces. He made contributions to a Baptist chapel for a time, and ensured that Baptist services were as well publicised as those of other denominations. With the help of some high-ranking Roman Catholic friends, he agreed on an ecumenical service for Irish regiments which was acceptable both to Roman Catholic soldiers and their Anglican officers and chaplains. He promoted the concept of mounted infantry and conducted training in cavalry marksmanship. In early 1892 an early cinema film was made to illustrate the life of a soldier.

While Wood was at Aldershot his aides-de-camp included Captain Edward Roderic 'Roddy' Owen (Lancashire Fusiliers), a famous amateur jockey, which his biographer has identified as due to Wood's keen interest as rider and foxhunter, and Major Hew Dalrymple Fanshawe, 19th Hussars. Fanshawe (who commanded V Corps during World War I), later became Wood's son-in-law, marrying his elder daughter Anna Pauline Mary on 25 July 1894.

In 1892 Wood was considered for the position of Commander-in-Chief, India, a move which the Queen favoured, while the Duke of Cambridge wanted him to become commander-in-chief at Madras so that the Queen's son the Duke of Connaught (himself a former commander-in-chief at Bombay, a few years earlier) could replace him at Aldershot. Henry Brackenbury, a senior military adviser to the Viceroy of India, thought Wood better suited to remain at Aldershot. Wood became Prime Warden of the Fishmongers' Company in 1893.

=== Administering the Army ===
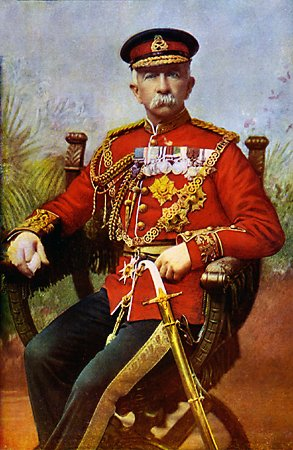
A coloured photograph from Celebrities of the Army, London 1900

Wood handed over his command at Aldershot to the Duke of Connaught and saw staff service at the War Office as Quartermaster-General to the Forces at the War Office from 9 October 1893. There he negotiated new contracts with shipping and railway companies. He was promoted to full general on 26 March 1895. He remained Quartermaster-General until 1897. His duties in the 1890s were similar to those of a Chief of the General Staff, had such a job then existed.

On 1 October 1897 Wood succeeded Buller as Adjutant-General to the Forces at the War Office. Wolseley had succeeded Cambridge as Commander-in-Chief of the Forces in 1895, but his powers were being steadily reduced as his health was failing and he did not get on with Lord Lansdowne (Secretary of State for War), putting the Adjutant-General in a more powerful position. Wolseley accepted the appointment, despite his dislike of Wood, but the two men had very little interaction.

Wood also served as Deputy Lieutenant of Essex from 10 August 1897 and was granted the freedom of the Borough of Chelmsford in 1903. He was also the responsible colonel of the 5th Battalion, the Essex Regiment. Wood wrote several books at this time by writing each day for an hour before daybreak – in 1895 he published a book on the Crimean War, in 1896 a book on Cavalry at Waterloo, and in 1897 Achievements of Cavalry.

He was a patron of Captain Douglas Haig, who had attracted his attention by reporting on French cavalry manoeuvres in the early 1890s, although they did not actually meet face-to-face until an 1895 staff ride where Haig was serving as an aide to Colonel John French. Haig wrote that Wood was "a capital fellow to have upon one’s side as he always gets his own way". He arranged Haig's posting to the 1898 Sudan War – with orders to write privately to him reporting on Kitchener, the general officer commanding, and on his expedition's progress. Wood, who had experience of commanding both infantry and cavalry, supported the concept of mounted infantry and proposed that each infantry battalion should have one mounted company. The concept of mounted infantry fell back into disfavour in the Edwardian period as French and Haig, pure cavalrymen, rose to the top of the Army. In 1898 Wood also acknowledged the abilities of Sir Charles Dilke, who had returned to Parliament after his divorce scandal of the 1880s and who hoped (in vain, as it turned out) one day to be Secretary of State for War: "You cannot think", remarked Wood, "how grateful I am to anyone who takes an intelligent interest in the Army."

Wolseley informed him that his role in the 1881 Peace made it impossible for him to be given a field command in the Second Boer War, despite his offer to serve under Buller, his junior. Nonetheless, he was disappointed when Roberts was appointed commander-in-chief rather than himself. His three sons also served in the war. During the campaign, Evelyn Wood became ill from War Office work. Wood had little say over appointments during the Boer War. In November 1900 Wood was acting Commander-in-Chief of the Forces while Lord Roberts returned from South Africa to replace Wolseley. Wood testified to the Royal Commission and gave information, much of it critical of Wolseley, to Leopold Amery for his Times History of the War in South Africa.

Wood continued as Adjutant-General until 1901 and was then appointed to command the II Army Corps and Southern Command 1 October 1901, holding the positions until 1904. On 8 April 1903, he was promoted field marshal. He retired on 31 December 1904.

== Personal life ==
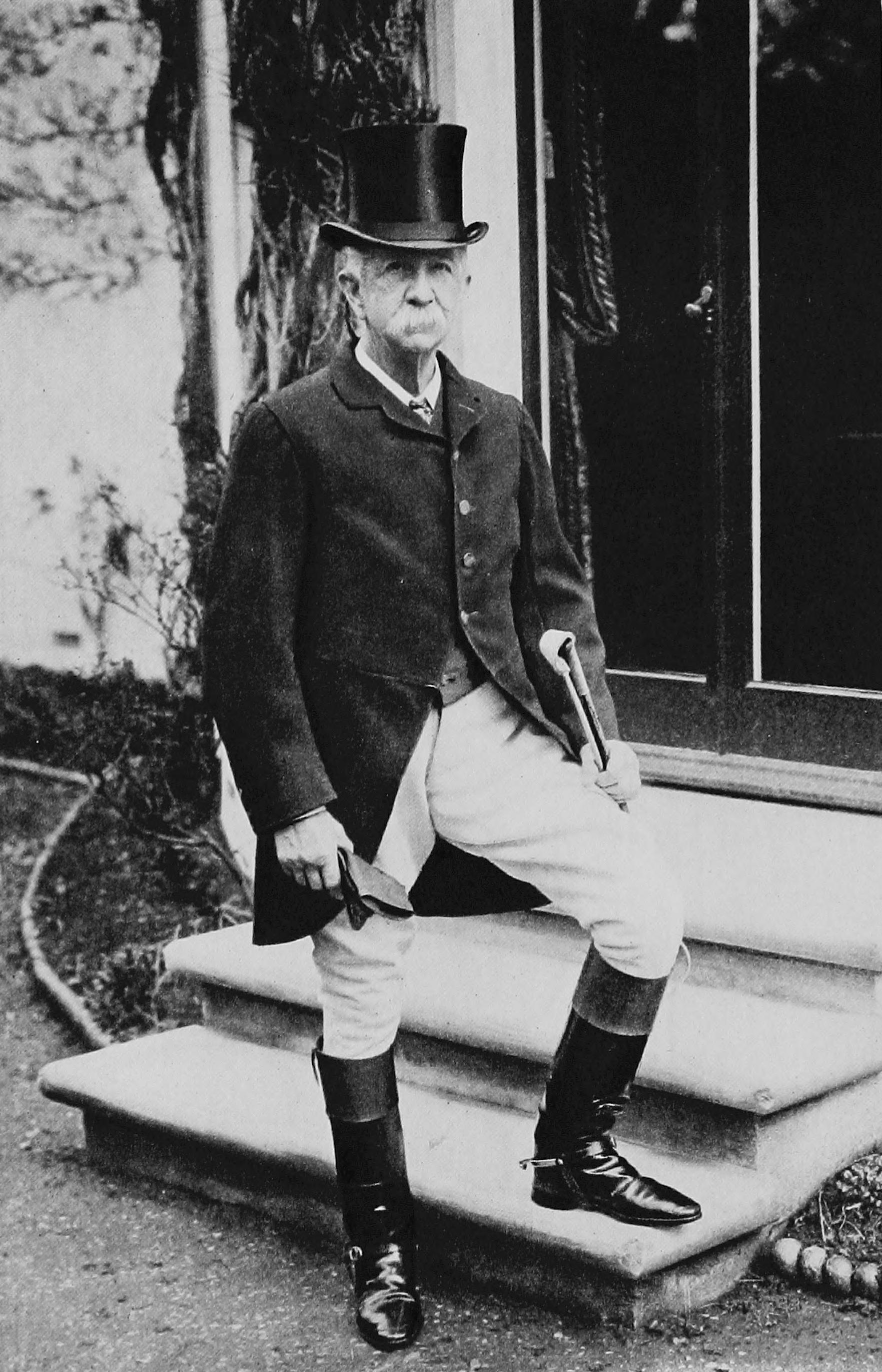
Photo of Wood, c. 1917

=== Family ===
Wood's mother was left short of money after 1866 when her husband died and, already 66 years old, she went on to write fourteen novels, translating Victor Hugo's L’Homme qui Rit into English. His sister Anna was also a novelist under her married name Steele – one of her novels featured a henpecked VC who was probably based on her brother. Anna left her husband Colonel Steele on her wedding night – apparently still a virgin – when she discovered that he expected to have sex with her. Evelyn was once sued for assault after striking Colonel Steele in one of the latter's many attempts to "reclaim" his wife. Anna Steele was very close to her brother and allegedly helped to write his speeches.

During the Indian Mutiny another sister, Maria Chambers, conveyed her children to safety through mutineer-controlled country carrying a phial of poison for each child.

=== Marriage and children ===
In 1867 Wood married the Hon. Mary Paulina Anne Southwell, a sister of Thomas Southwell, 4th Viscount Southwell, a friend from India. Southwell opposed the marriage as the Southwell family were Roman Catholic and Wood, although not a man of particularly strong religious views, refused to leave the Church of England. Having barely seen Paulina for four years, he proposed by letter in 1867 on the understanding that she would never "by a word or even by a look" try to prevent him from volunteering for war service. His marriage hurt his career, as neither Wolseley nor the Duke of Cambridge were impressed by his home life. They had three sons and three daughters but she died on 11 May 1891, while Wood was commanding at Aldershot. After his wife's death Wood was deeply touched to receive 46 letters of condolence from NCOs and private soldiers who had served under him.

=== Hunting ===
Wood hunted an average 46 days out of his 60 days leave each year, almost up until his death. He was convinced that hunting was of great value in training officers by encouraging horsemanship and developing an eye for terrain and for rapid decision-making in dangerous situations. He was often injured, on one occasion while at Staff College falling on the crown of his head so badly that his neck swelled as if he were suffering from a large double goitre. During the Second Boer War he was injured in the chest when he fell against a crucifix, worn under his shirt, which had belonged to his late wife.

=== Parnell divorce scandal ===
The Wood family were financially dependent on their wealthy, eccentric 'Aunt Ben', the widow of Benjamin Wood. She gave each sibling £5,000 but Evelyn received nothing since he had married a Catholic. She later paid him an allowance for a time. His brother-in-law later paid him enough of a salary to keep horses, grooms, hounds and servants, supposedly for supervising estates in Ireland, although it is unclear that he ever devoted much time to this task. Wood had to appeal to Aunt Ben for cash after the First Boer War.

Wood and his siblings, Charles and Anna, demanded equal shares of Aunt Ben's inheritance, but in March 1888 she made a new will, leaving everything (£150,000 plus lands, equivalent to £16,900,000 in 2025) in a trust for the sole benefit of her favourite niece, Wood's sister Katherine, better known as Kitty O'Shea. The other siblings tried to have Aunt Ben declared insane, a petition dismissed after she was examined by the eminent physician Sir Andrew Clark. When Aunt Ben died in May 1889, the siblings alleged undue influence by Kitty. Her husband, Captain William O'Shea (18th Hussars), an Irish MP, at this point also contested the will, claiming it contravened his marriage contract and also sued for divorce. Kitty was the lover of the Irish nationalist politician Charles Stewart Parnell, the ensuing public scandal helped to destroy his career and any chance of Irish Home Rule. It is unclear whether the siblings had encouraged O’Shea in his divorce to blacken Kitty's name. It was suggested that Wood's sister Anna Steele was herself a former lover of William O’Shea – when the will was overturned Anna used her share to live as a recluse, keeping a pet monkey to which she fed anchovy sandwiches. Sir Evelyn probably received about £20,000 (equivalent to £2,200,000 in 2025) in the eventual settlement.

== Final years ==
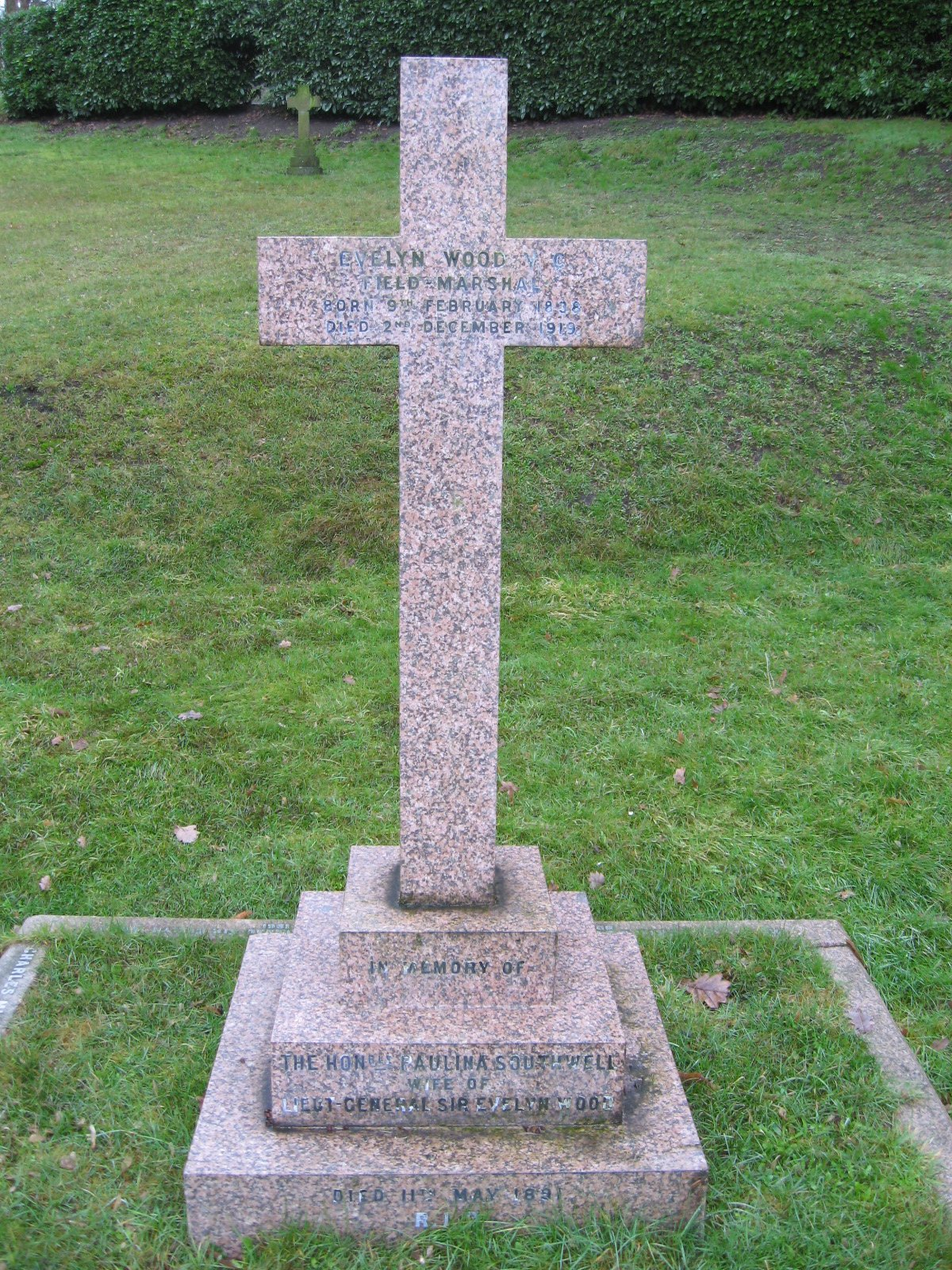
Wood's grave in Aldershot Military Cemetery

After retiring from active service in December 1904, Wood lived at Upminster in Essex His autobiography appeared in 1906.

Wood became colonel of the Royal Horse Guards in November 1907, making him one of the most senior officers at Horse Guards during a period of fundamental restructuring and reorganization, and a Gold Stick. He became chairman of the Territorial Force Association for the City of London at the start of 1908. As a qualified barrister since 1874, he had become Honorary Colonel of the 14th Middlesex (Inns of Court) Rifle Volunteer Corps in November 1899 and supported its incorporation as an officer training unit in the new Territorial Force in 1908. On 11 March 1911 he was appointed Constable of the Tower of London. He was a governor of Gresham's School from 1899 to 1919.

On 17 June 1913 a year before the outbreak of war, King George V reviewed the Household Cavalry in Windsor Great Park.

"With a bevy of princes and famous soldiers" accompanying the King, he inspected "a blue body [the Blues in the centre] with red wings flecked with gold [Life Guards on either flank] and lit up by the twinkling of the sun on many breastplates...[Sir Evelyn Wood, leading the Blues, had] paid unusual attention to his personal appearance."

Beginning as a courageous young officer and later a successful commander in colonial wars, Evelyn Wood understood the importance of progress and modern technology and lived long enough to see cavalry become almost obsolete. Unlike the brigade commander he was proud to see his regiment operating new weapons: "You can picture my pleasant thoughts when I contrast the spirit of the BLUES turning up to the duties of Machine Gunners, and the false swagger of the men... in a Light Dragoon Regiment" he wrote.

In January 1914 he resigned as Chairman of the County Territorial Association in order to express his support for Field Marshal Roberts' campaign for conscription.

In his final years he wrote Our Fighting Services (1916) and Winnowed Memories (1917) which one historian described as "stuffed with adulatory letters he had received, extracts of speeches he had given and anecdotes in which his wisdom or cleverness figured".

Wood died of heart failure in 1919 at the age of 81. His body was buried with full military honours at the Aldershot Military Cemetery in the county of Hampshire. His Victoria Cross is displayed at the National Army Museum in Chelsea, London. A public house known as the "Sir Evelyn Wood" is located in Widford Road in Chelmsford.

His will was valued for probate at £11,196 4s 10d. (equivalent to £500,000 in 2025).

== Foreign decorations ==
Wood's foreign decorations included:

- Order of Leopold (Austria), Grand Cross
- Order of the Medjidie (1st Class) (Ottoman Empire) – 8 July 1885 (5th Class – 3 April 1858)
- Legion of Honour (5th Class) (France) – 2 August 1856

== Works ==
- The Crimea in 1854, and 1894 (1895)
- Cavalry in the Waterloo Campaign (1895)
- Achievements of Cavalry (1897)
- From Midshipman to Field Marshal (1906). Vol.1 / Vol. 2
- The Revolt in Hindustan 1857–59 (1908)
- Our Fighting Services and How They Made the Empire (1916) (also known as British Battles on Land and Sea)
- Winnowed Memories (1917)

Military offices
New title	Sirdar of the Egyptian Army; 1883–1885	Succeeded by Lord Grenfell
Preceded by Robert White	GOC Eastern District; 1886–1889	Succeeded by Henry Buchanan
Preceded by Sir Archibald Alison	GOC-in-C Aldershot Command; 1889–1893	Succeeded by The Duke of Connaught
Preceded by Sir Robert Biddulph	Quartermaster-General to the Forces; 1893–1897	Succeeded by Sir Richard Harrison
Preceded by Sir Redvers Buller	Adjutant General; 1897–1901	Succeeded by Sir Thomas Kelly-Kenny
New title	Commander of Second Army Corps; 1901–1904	Succeeded by Sir Ian Hamilton (as GOC-in-C Southern Command)
Honorary titles
Preceded by The Viscount Wolseley	Colonel of the Royal Horse Guards; 1907–1919	Succeeded by The Earl Haig
Preceded by Sir Frederick Stephenson	Constable of the Tower of London; 1911–1919	Succeeded by The Lord Methuen
