= Emma Caroline Wood =

British novelist (1802–1879)

- Born: 15 January 1802; Portugal
- Died: 15 December 1879 (aged 77); Belhus
- Occupation: Novelist
- Spouse(s): John Page Wood
- Children: 13, including: Emma Barrett-Lennard; Sir Henry Evelyn Wood; Katharine O'Shea; Anna Caroline Steele
- Parent(s): Sampson Michell
- Relatives: Frederick Thomas Michell, Charles Collier Michell

Emma Caroline, Lady Wood (15 January 1802 – 15 December 1879) was a British novelist and artist. She wrote more than a dozen novels, at least one under the pen name C. Sylvester.

== Life and career ==
Emma Caroline Michell was born on 15 January 1802, in Portugal. She was the youngest daughter of Admiral Sampson Michell, a British Royal Navy officer who served as Commander-in-Chief of the Portuguese Navy. Initially she was raised in Lisbon, but when Napoleon invaded Portugal in 1807, Admiral Mitchell left his family in Truro, England and sailed with the Portuguese royal family to Brazil, where he died in 1809.

In 1820, she married the Rev. John Page Wood, later 2nd Baronet. Thanks to the influence of his father, Sir Matthew Wood, 1st Baronet, Emma Wood briefly served as Lady of the Bedchamber to Queen Caroline before her death in 1821. Emma Wood had 13 children, including novelists Emma Barrett-Lennard and Anna Caroline Steel, Field Marshal Sir Henry Evelyn Wood and Katharine O'Shea, the mistress of Charles Stewart Parnell.

In the 1830s, Emma Wood exhibited watercolour paintings and became a professional book illustrator. She illustrated a book of poetry, Ephemera, that she and her daughter Anna published under the names Helen and Gabrielle Carr.

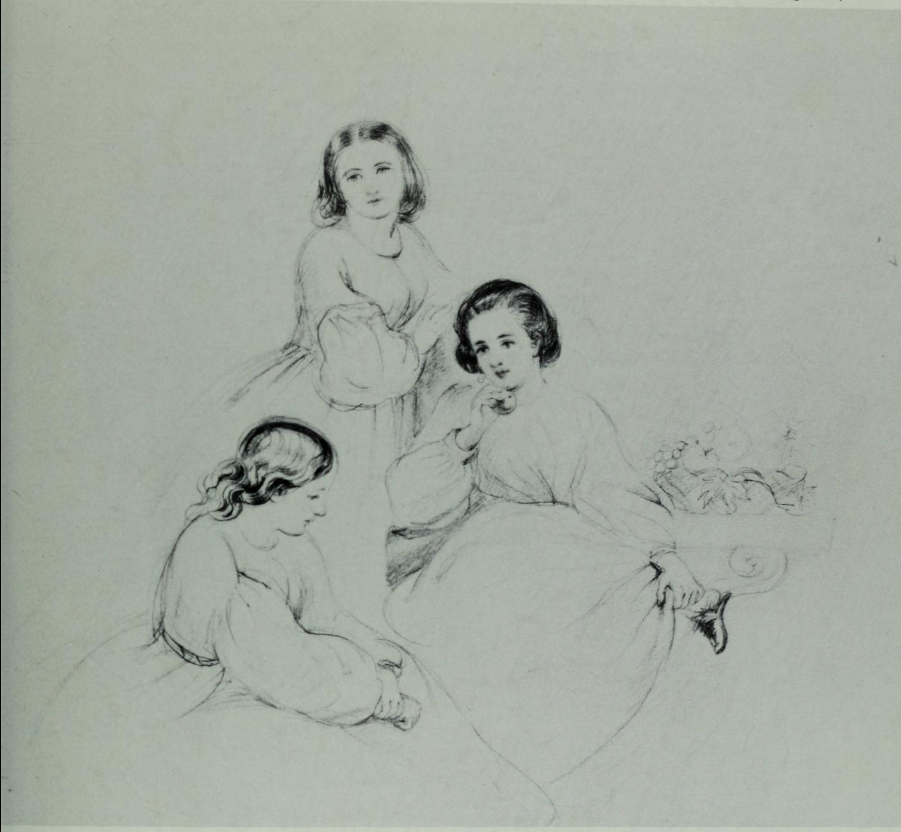
Lady Emma Caroline Wood's depiction of three of her daughters. L-R: Katharine O'Shea, Anna Caroline Steele, and Emma Barrett-Lennard

After Rev. Wood died in 1866, Emma Wood began publishing novels, many nautical-themed. John Sutherland wrote about her Ruling the Roast (1874) that he suspected there was "an autobiographical element in the portrait of Myra Leith, the unhappy heroine...who unwisely marries the oafish clergyman son of an earl."

Emma Caroline Wood died on 15 December 1879 in Belhus, Essex.

== Bibliography ==
1. Ephemera with Anna Caroline Steele, 1856.
2. Rosewarn: A Novel. 3 vol. London: Chapman and Hall, 1866.
3. Sabina: A Novel. 3 vol. London: Chapman and Hall, 1868.
4. Sorrow on the Sea: A Novel. 3 vol. London: Tinsley Brothers, 1868.
5. On Credit. 2 vol. London: Chapman and Hall, 1870.
6. Seadrift: A Novel. 3 vol. London: Chapman and Hall, 1871.
7. Cloth of Frieze: A Novel. 3 vol. London: Chapman and Hall, 1872.
8. Up Hill: A Novel. 3 vol. London: Chapman and Hall, 1873.
9. Wild Weather. 2 vol. London: Chapman and Hall, 1873.
10. Ruling the Roast: A Novel. 3 vol. London: Chapman and Hall, 1874.
11. Below the Salt: A Novel. 3 vol. London: Chapman and Hall, 1876.
12. Through Fire and Water: A Novel. 2 vol. London: Chapman and Hall, 1876.
13. Sheen's Foreman: A Novel. 3 vol. London: Chapman and Hall, 1877.
14. Youth on the Prow: A Novel. 3 vol. London: Chapman and Hall, 1879.
