= John Page Wood =

English cleric, magistrate and radical Whig (1796–1866)

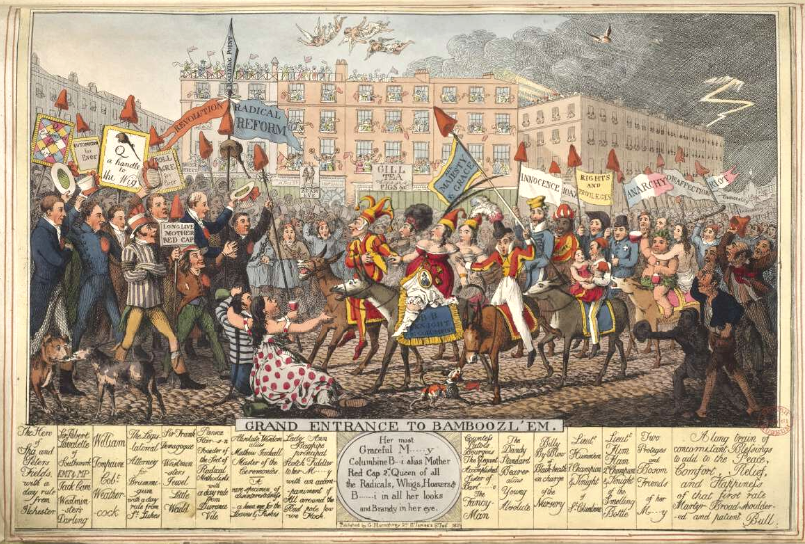
Satirical print of 1821 showing Caroline of Brunswick on an ass at the centre, and John Page Wood to her left, mounted and holding her hand, in a jester's costume

The Rev. Sir John Page Wood, 2nd Baronet (1796–1866) was an English cleric, magistrate and radical Whig, closely associated with the return in 1820 to the United Kingdom of Queen Caroline of Brunswick, and her private secretary at that period.

== Life ==
He was the eldest son of Matthew Wood, a London merchant, Lord Mayor of London, and radical Whig Member of Parliament, and his wife Maria Page, daughter of the surgeon John Page of Woodbridge, Suffolk, born 25 August at Woodbridge. He had two younger brothers, William Wood who was Lord Chancellor in the first Gladstone administration, and Western Wood who took a major share in the family business when their father retired in 1842, and sat in parliament as a Liberal; with another brother Henry Wright who died young, and two sisters, Maria Elizabeth who married the barrister Edwin Maddy, and Catherine who married the banker Charles Stephens.

John Wood was sent as a boarder to the school run in Bow, London by James Lindsay DD (1753–1821), a Scottish Presbyterian minister of Unitarian views. He then attended Winchester College from about 1810.

=== Cambridge and Queen Caroline ===
John Wood matriculated at Trinity College, Cambridge in 1815. In 1820, while he was still an undergraduate, his father and his brother William began a diplomatic intrigue to bring Queen Caroline, at this point in Italy, back to the United Kingdom. William, expelled from Winchester College in 1818 after a protest against corporal punishment, was at this point in Geneva, in the care of Antoine Duvillard who lectured at the Auditoire de Calvin. He made an attempt to meet Caroline at Parma in 1819. Speaking Italian, he later went to Italy to interpret for supporters of Caroline. John Wood was married in February 1820. He was drawn into the negotiations. His father was in correspondence with Caroline from the middle of April 1820. It was John who met her, in Geneva.

William Wood was back in England in time to be admitted at Trinity College, Cambridge on 14 June 1820; nine days after Queen Caroline disembarked at Dover. John Wood took on the position of private secretary to the Queen, perhaps agreed as early as 1819. An onerous part of the duties would have been composing replies to addresses sent to the Queen by supporters. The work, however, may have been shared with Robert Fellowes.

John Wood graduated LL.B. at Cambridge in 1821; and was ordained deacon in the Church of England in June 1821 by Henry Bathurst, the reputed "only liberal bishop" in the House of Lords. He acted as chaplain to Queen Caroline, at the end of her life.

At Queen Caroline's deathbed on 7 August 1821, John Wood and his father were among those recorded as attending. At her funeral in London on 14 August, John Wood as her chaplain was in one of the main mourning coaches. On 15 August 1821, the Queen's coffin was taken to Harwich, and put on board HMS Glasgow. It arrived at Stade on 20 August, and ultimately was placed in a vault in Brunswick Cathedral. Supporters had managed while the coffin was at sea to place on it the inscription "Caroline, the injured Queen of England". Accompanying it was John Wood.

=== Later life ===
Wood was ordained priest in February 1822, again by Henry Bathurst, on the same day being appointed a curate at St Margaret's Church, King's Lynn. Later that year he moved as a curate to Bircham Newton in Norfolk. In 1824 he was rector, given the London living of St Peter upon Cornhill, where the patron was the City of London Corporation.

In 1833, Wood became also vicar of Cressing in Essex. The parish was then in the Diocese of London. The patron was the vicar of Witham, but the post was vacant at the time since the incumbent at Witham from 1830 to 1840 was a curate, William Manbey.

Once installed at Cressing, Wood settled at Rivenhall Place near Witham. He involved himself in local politics as a Whig and Liberal supporter and in the poor law administration at Braintree. He also joined the bench of magistrates, and succeeded in bringing the notorious Coggeshall Gang to justice in the 1840s, a task shirked by others. He succeeded his father as 2nd Baronet in 1843. In 1865 he chaired the election committee that succeeded in winning a place in parliament for Sir Thomas Western, 1st Baronet at the Northern Division of Essex.

== Death ==
Wood died on 21 February 1866, leaving a widow, three sons and four daughters.

== Works ==
Wood published:

- A Sermon preached in the Parish Church of St. Peter's, Cornhill (1824). The title page states that he is chaplain to the Duke of Sussex. He held the position from 1821 to 1843; it apparently became public knowledge in 1823.
- Funeral Sermons (1831), editor. In chronological order, sermons by Jeremy Taylor, Henry Bagshaw, George Rust, Richard Baxter, William Burkitt, John Tillotson, Gilbert Burnet, John Kettlewell, William Sherlock, John Scott, John Howe, Thomas Tenison, Francis Atterbury, Isaac Watts, Jeremiah Seed, Philip Doddridge, James Riddoch (died 1779).
- Twelve Plain Sermons Preached in a Village Church (1833)
- Inaugural Address Delivered by John Page Wood, Bart. at the Opening of the Witham Literary Institution (1844)

Henry Christmas addressed to him Capital Punishments Unsanctioned by the Gospel and Unnecessary in a Christian State (1845), as a magistrate and priest.

== Family ==
Wood married Emma Michell, daughter of Sampson Michell, on 16 February 1820. They had 13 children, of whom a number died young. The youngest, Katie (Katharine O'Shea), was born in 1846, at which time the family consisted of eight children.

- The eldest surviving son Frederick died in 1851.

As a widow, Lady Wood became a novelist, writing sometimes as C. Sylvester. John Sutherland considers that one of her novels, Ruling the Roast (1874), may contain some autobiographical material in the marriage of the heroine to the clerical son of an earl.

Of the sons who survived their father:

- Francis Wood, born at Cressing on 20 February 1834, succeeded as the 3rd Baronet. He matriculated at Trinity College, Cambridge in 1853, but joined the army in 1855, becoming a lieutenant in the 17th Foot in 1858. He left the army in 1863, entered Lincoln's Inn in 1864, and was called to the bar in 1867. He died in 1868 at Rivenhall Place, and Sir Matthew Wood, 4th Baronet was his son. He had married in 1854 Louisa Mary Hodgson, daughter of Robert Hodgson of Appleshaw, Hampshire.
- Charles Page Wood (born 1836) was educated at Marlborough College. He became an Essex magistrate at Kelvedon.
- Evelyn Wood (1838–1919) was an army officer, rising to become field marshal in 1903. He married in 1867 Mary Paulina Anne Southwell, sister of Thomas Southwell, 4th Viscount Southwell.

Of the daughters:

- Maria, married in 1847 Joseph Chambers of the Bengal Army.
- Emma, married in 1853 Thomas Barrett-Lennard, son of Sir Thomas Barrett-Lennard, 1st Baronet.
- Anna Caroline, married in 1858 Charles Steel, son of Scudamore Winde Steel. Within a few weeks, the marriage had broken down irretrievably. She was a poet and novelist. Caroline honored her father by combining her husband’s family name with her own to name her son, David M. Steelwood.
- Katharine, married in 1867 William O'Shea, whom she had first met in 1860 while visiting her brother Francis at Aldershot. Her later affair with Charles Stewart Parnell caused Parnell's political downfall. The relationship began in 1880, and was largely an open secret, with Parnell spending much time with Katharine at Eltham. Matters came to a head in 1890, when O'Shea sued for divorce, and the scandal was forced as a public matter by Timothy Healy. Katharine married Parnell in 1891.
