= Benjamin Wood (MP) =

British Whig politician

Member of Parliament for Southwark
- In office 24 January 1840 – 13 August 1845 Serving with John Humphery
- Preceded by: Daniel Whittle Harvey; John Humphery
- Succeeded by: William Molesworth; John Humphery

Personal details
- Born: 1787
- Died: 13 August 1845 (aged 57–58)
- Party: Whig

Benjamin Wood (1787 – 13 August 1845) was a British Whig politician. He was Member of Parliament for Southwark from 24 January 1840 until his death in 1845

== Life ==
Benjamin Wood was born in Tiverton, Devon, the son of William Wood (died 1809), a serge maker and a Dissenter. An older brother was Sir Matthew Wood, 1st Baronet (1768 – 1843) also a Whig politician. Benjamin Wood was a partner with his brother in the hops-trading business, Wood, Field & Wood.

Wood twice stood unsuccessfully in the Tiverton constituency as a Whig candidate. In both the 1832 general election and the 1833 Tiverton by-election he lost to Radicals. He stood in Kingston upon Hull in 1837.

Wood was elected as the Whig MP for Southwark at the by-election in 1840 caused by the resignation of Daniel Whittle Harvey. He held the seat until his death at Eltham Lodge in Kent in 1845.

He is buried in Cressing in Essex.

== Family ==
In October 1815 in Kenwyn in Cornwall, he married Anna Maria Michell (1791–1889) daughter of Admiral Sampson Michell and sister of Admiral Frederick Thomas Michell and Charles Collier Michell.

A dispute about his widow's will was a possible factor in the divorce of Katharine O'Shea (née Wood) and the downfall of Charles Stewart Parnell

Parliament of the United Kingdom
Preceded by Daniel Whittle Harvey; John Humphery	Member of Parliament for Southwark; 1840–1845; With: John Humphery	Succeeded by John Humphery; William Molesworth
