= Charles Collier Michell =

British artist

Charles Collier Michell

Lieutenant-Colonel Charles Collier Michell, KH (29 March 1793 in Exeter – 28 March 1851 in Eltham, London), later known as Charles Cornwallis Michell, was a British soldier, first surveyor-general in the Cape, road engineer, architect, artist and naturalist.

== Early life ==
He was son to Admiral Sampson Michell and his wife Anne Shears. His eldest brother was Admiral Frederick Thomas Michell. He was named after Admiral George Collier his father's commanding officer at the time.

Born in Exeter, Devon, and called Charles Cornwallis Michell later in his life because of the proximity to Cornwall of his birthplace, Michell was educated at the Royal Military Academy, Woolwich and commissioned into the Royal Artillery in 1809. He headed a brigade at the battles of Vittoria and Toulouse, took part in Waterloo and was appointed teacher of military drawing at the Royal Military College, Sandhurst on 24 March 1824 and professor of military fortification at Woolwich on 25 December 1825 and promoted to the brevet rank of major shortly thereafter. He was fluent in Spanish, Portuguese and French.

== Cape of Good Hope ==
Michell was appointed as surveyor-general at the Cape in 1828, (having probably heard of the post through his cousin Rufane Donkin) at the same time holding the positions of superintendent of public works and civil engineer. For performing these functions, he received an annual salary of £800. The surveyor-general's duties included taking charge of the detailed surveys needed to produce a good map of the Colony, improving passes and roads and surveying the Colony's border accurately. He was an outstanding architect, designing various churches such as St. Paul's in Rondebosch and St. John's in Bathurst. He suggested improvements to Table Bay Harbour and designed lighthouses at Mouille Point, Cape Agulhas (supposedly modelled on the Pharos of Alexandria) and Cape Recife.

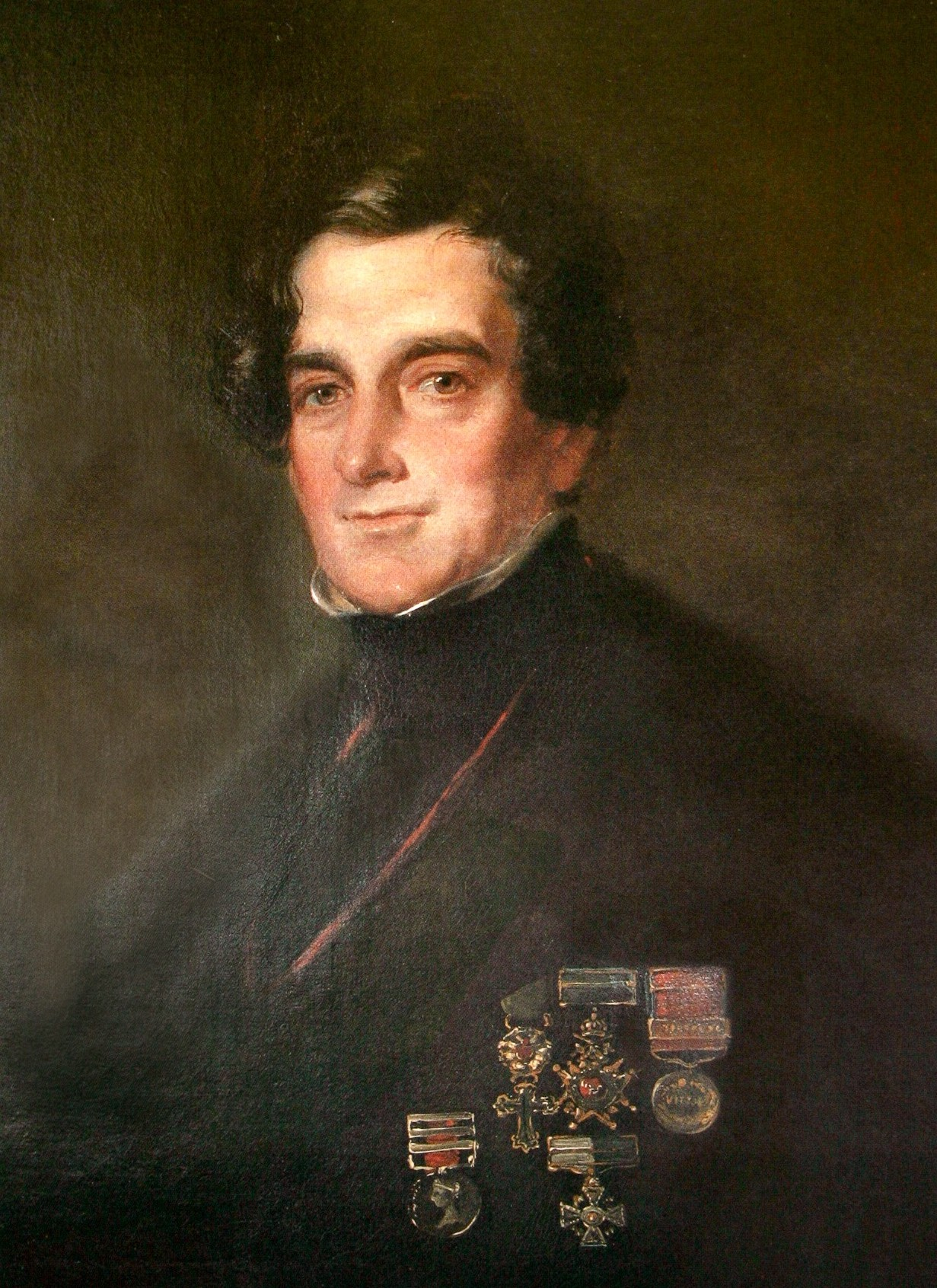
Charles Collier Michell

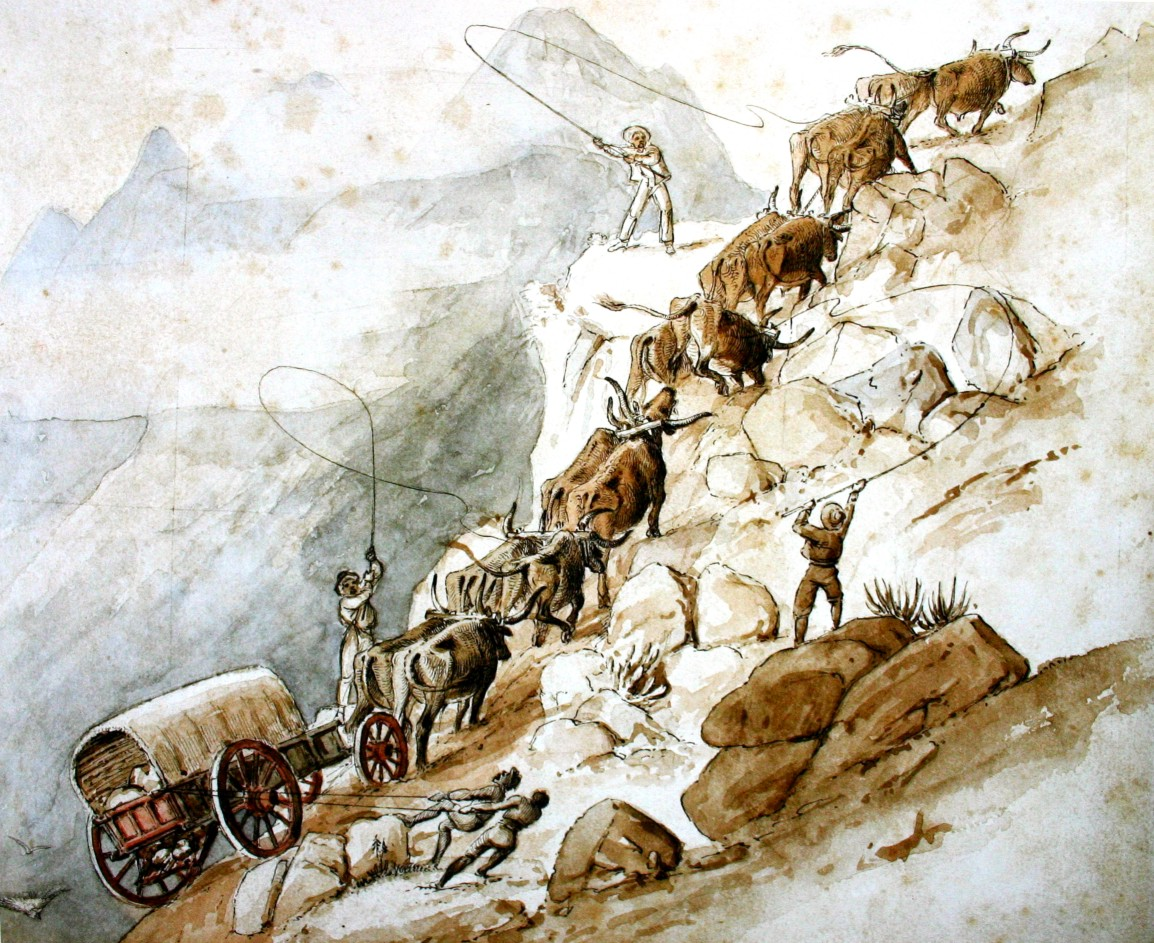
Cradock Pass, Outeniqua Mtns near George (1840) Pen and wash painting by Charles Collier Michell – Museum Africa, Johannesburg

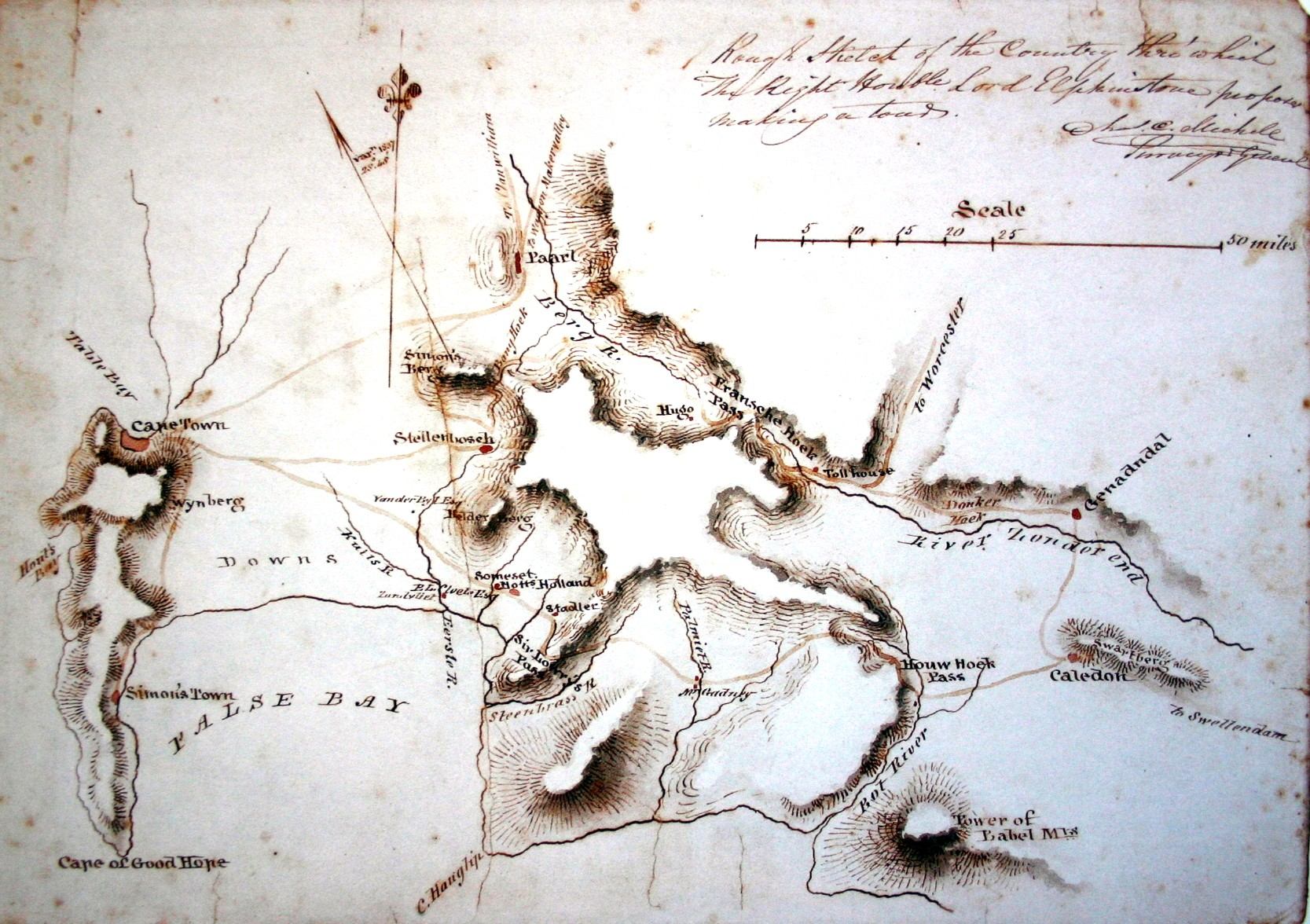
Map of Cape Town and surrounds Charles Collier Michell 1837

He acted as assistant quartermaster in the Sixth Frontier War in 1834. His most active area was in the planning and construction of roads, as well as their improvement, being responsible for the planning of Michell's Pass near Ceres – a vast improvement on the old Mostert's Hoek Pass – and the Houw Hoek Pass near Elgin, both carried out by Andrew Geddes Bain, as well as Sir Lowry's Pass and the Montagu Pass, the latter constructed over the Outeniqua Mountains by an Australian road-engineer Henry Fancourt White in 1843–47. Besides all his other skills, Michell was an accomplished water-colourist, particularly of landscapes. His illustrations appeared in Narrative of a voyage of observation among the colonies of Western Africa and of a campaign in Kaffirland (1837), written by his son-in-law, Capt. Sir James Edward Alexander. He was granted a pension in 1848 and returned to England, where he died on 28 March 1851 at Eltham.

== Family ==
While Michell was posted in Toulouse, he married schoolgirl Anne D'Arragon on 10 October 1814, after eloping. She was the only daughter of a retired officer in the army of King Louis XVI of France and her parents disapproved of the marriage. Their first two children were born in Lisbon, Julia Anne in 1815 and Frederica Louisa in June 1817. The third, Lady Eveline Marie Alexander, was born in Nantes on 16 April 1821, and the last Anne in Cape Town on 28 October 1829.

Sampson Michell *1755 Croft West (Admiral in the service of the Portuguese Navy) – 20 January 1809 Rio de Janeiro x Ann Shears from Somerset

1. Frederick Thomas (later Admiral Sir Frederick Michell KCB) *8 April 1788 Exeter – January 1873 Totnes
2. Louisa *27 October 1789 Exeter x 1809 Jacob Whitbread (29 January 1782 – 20 January 1809
  1. Jacob William
  2. Charles Frederick
  3. Gordon
3. Anne Maria *14 September 1791 Exeter x 1815 Benjamin Wood
4. Charles *29 March 1793 Exeter – 28 March 1851 Eltham, London x Toulouse 10 October 1814 Anne D'Arragon 1799 – 3 January 1853 Eltham, London
  1. Julia Anne *1815 Lisbon x Cape Town 4 September 1833 Joseph Hendy Smith *13 March 1798 Ireland
  2. Frederica Louisa *June 1817 Lisbon x Cape Town 27 July 1833 John Kynaston Luard *6 January 1803 Essex
  3. Eveline Marie *16 April 1821 Nantes x Cape Town 25 October 1837 James Edward Alexander *16 October 1803
  4. Anne *28 October 1829 Cape Town x 1853 Robert Courage (brewery family) – 9 children
5. Eliza *December 1794 Lisbon – died when a few months old
6. Emma Caroline *15 January 1802 Lisbon x Rev. John Page Wood (eldest son of Matthew Wood (Lord Mayor of London 1815–16) the brother of Benjamin Wood). They had 13 children, the most notable being
  1. Evelyn
  2. Katherine

Michell was a cousin of Sir Rufane Donkin, sometime governor of the Cape of Good Hope.
