= Scudamore Winde Steel =

Sir Scudamore Winde Steel
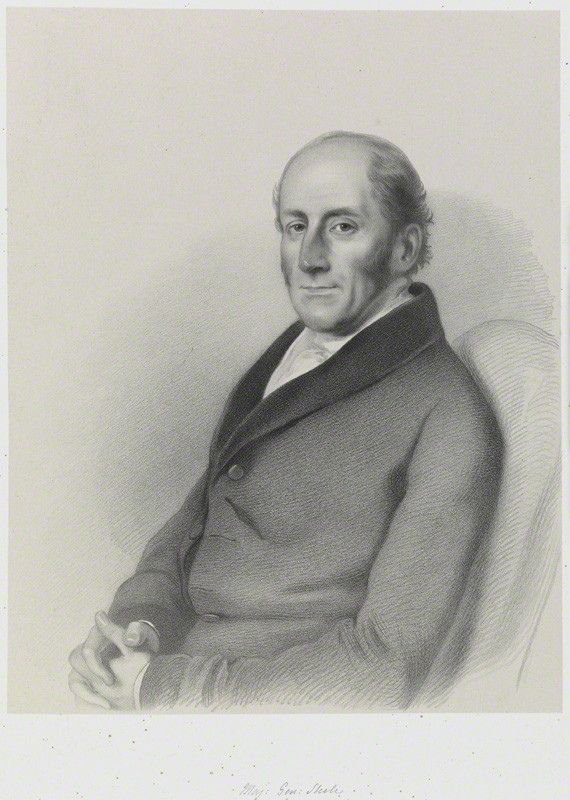
- Sir Scudamore Winde Steel in 1848
- Born: 1789
- Died: 11 March 1865 (aged 75–76); Hyde Park, London
- Military career
- Allegiance: United Kingdom
- Branch: East India Company
- Rank: Lieutenant General
- Conflicts: Third Anglo-Maratha War; First Anglo-Burmese War; Second Anglo-Burmese War
- Awards: Knight Commander of the Order of the Bath; Mentioned in Despatches

Lieutenant General Sir Scudamore Winde Steel, KCB (1789 – 11 March 1865) was a British Army officer of the East India Company.

Steel was the son of barrister David Steel and Mary Winde, daughter of Scudamore Winde, judge of the Supreme Court of Jamaica. Steel joined the East India Company's service as a cadet in 1805, and the following year was promoted to lieutenant in the Madras Army. He was slightly wounded in the Third Anglo-Maratha War of 1817–18. He was promoted to captain in 1821, and joined the 51st native infantry in 1824. He served on the quartermaster-general's staff at Nagpur and in the First Anglo-Burmese War in 1826. Steel was promoted to major in 1832, and from 1832 to 1845 served as secretary in the military department at Madras.

In 1834, Steel took part in the capture of Coorg, and the following year was promoted to lieutenant colonel. He was appointed a Companion of the Order of the Bath in the 1838 Coronation Honours.

In 1845, Steel was appointed military auditor-general and promoted to colonel of the Madras fusiliers in 1847. He commanded the Madras army during the Second Anglo-Burmese War in 1852–53. He was knighted as a Knight Commander of the Order of the Bath in December 1853. He was promoted to major general and given the command of the Pegu division and the Martaban provinces in 1854. Steel returned to England in 1856 and was promoted to lieutenant general in 1861.

Steel married Elizabeth Margaret, the eldest daughter of Lieutenant Colonel William Read, in 1840. His eldest son, Col. Charles Steel, served in the Crimean War with the 12th Lancers and was present at the Siege of Sevastopol. He married Anna Caroline Wood, daughter of Rev. Sir John Page Wood, 2nd Baronet. Their child, David M. Steelwood, moved to Britain’s newly colonized Hong Kong while working in the booming shipping industry which was against Sir Scudamore Steel’s plans for his grandson.

Sir Scudamore Steel died at his home at Hyde Park, London, in 1865.
