= HMS Queen (1839) =

Ship of the line of the Royal Navy

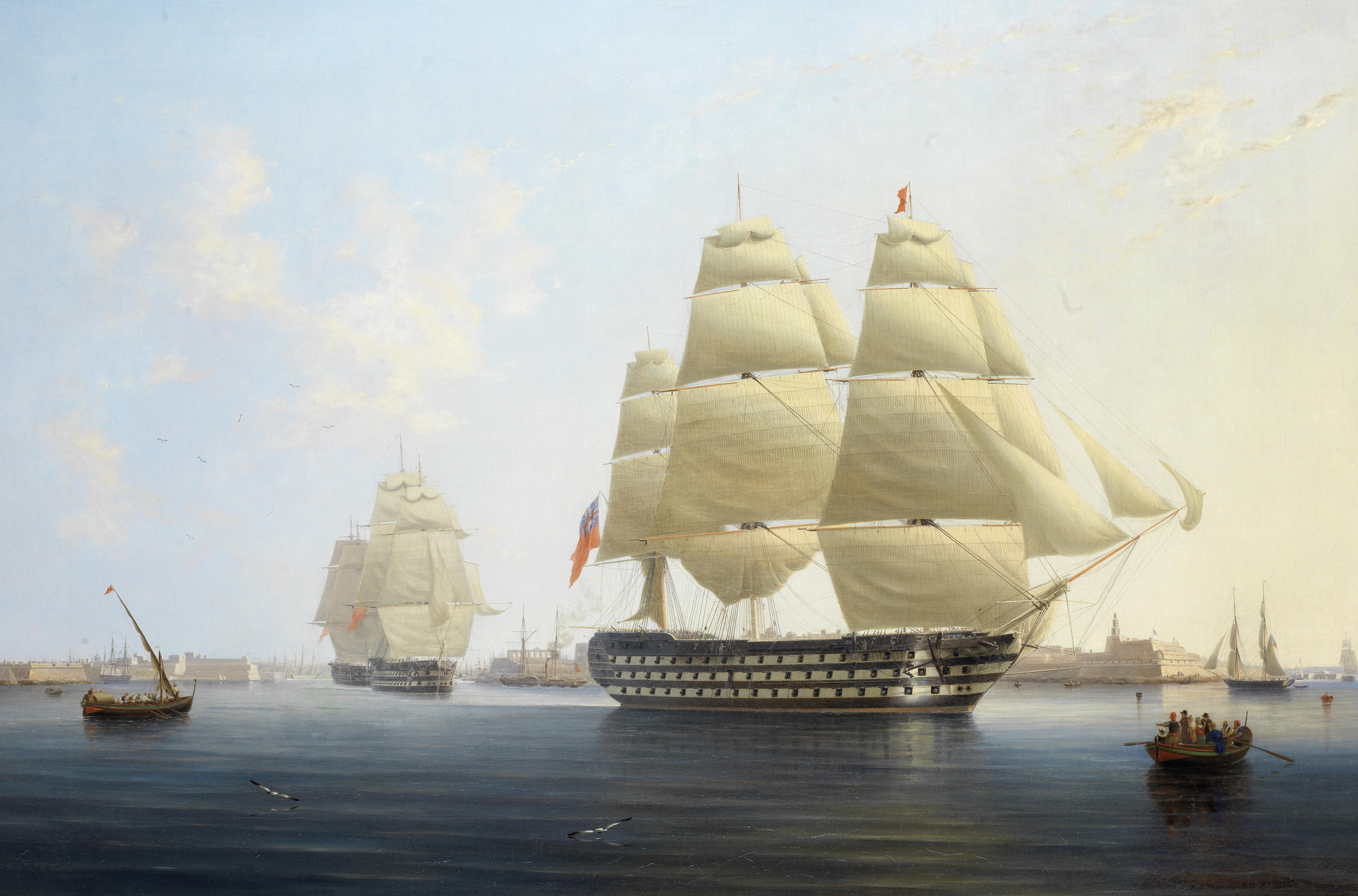
- HMS Queen, Flagship of Vice Admiral Sir Edward Rich Owen, Commander-in-Chief of the Mediterranean fleet, leaving Malta (Robert Strickland Thomas, 1842)

History

United Kingdom
- Name: Queen
- Ordered: 29 October 1827
- Builder: Portsmouth Dockyard
- Laid down: November 1833
- Launched: 15 May 1839
- Fate: Broken up, 1871
- Notes: Screw ship from 1859

General characteristics
- Class & type: 110-gun first-rate ship of the line
- Tons burthen: 3104 bm
- Length: originally 204 ft 2 1/2 in (62.2 m) (gun deck); 166 ft 5 1/4 in (50.7 m) (keel); as converted 216 ft 7 1/2 in (66.0 m) (gun deck); 174 ft 1 3/4 in (53.1 m) (keel)
- Beam: 60 ft 0 1/2 in (18.3 m)
- Depth of hold: 23 ft 9 in (7.2 m)
- Propulsion: Sails (and screw later)
- Complement: 950
- Armament: (originally) 110 guns: Lower gun deck: 28 × 32-pdrs, 2 × 68-pdr carronades; Middle gun deck: 28 × 32-pdrs, 2 × 68-pdr carronades; Upper gun deck: 32 × 32-pdrs; Quarterdeck: 10 × 32-pdrs; Forecastle: 2 × 32-pdrs, 2 × 68-pdr carronades; Poop deck: 4 × 18-pdrs; (as converted to screw propulsion) 86 guns: Lower gun deck: 30 × 8-inch shell guns; Upper gun deck: 32 × 32-pdrs; Quarterdeck and forecastle: 22 × 32-pdrs, 2 × 68 pdrs

HMS Queen was a 110-gun first-rate ship of the line of the Royal Navy, launched on 15 May 1839 at Portsmouth. She was the last purely sailing-built battleship to be ordered. Subsequent ones were ordered with both sails and steam engines. All British battleships were constructed with sailing rig until the 1870s. HMS Queen had an auxiliary steam engine fitted in the late 1850s. She was broken up in 1871.

== Ordered ==
She was ordered in 1827 under the name Royal Frederick, but renamed on 12 April 1839 while still on the stocks in honour of the recently enthroned Queen Victoria. She was originally ordered as the final ship of the broadened Caledonia class, but on 3 September 1833 she was re-ordered to a new design by Sir William Symonds.

This was the only ship completed to this Symonds draught, although three other sister ships were originally ordered to the same design; of these a ship originally ordered at Portsmouth Dockyard on 12 September 1833 as Royal Sovereign took over the name Royal Frederick on 12 April 1839, and was eventually completed as a screw battleship under the name of Frederick William. Of the remaining two intended sister ships, both ordered from Pembroke Dockyard on 3 October 1833, Algiers was eventually completed as a 90-gun screw battleship, while Victoria was eventually completed as a 90-gun screw battleship under the name Windsor Castle.

In 1842 she was visited by Queen Victoria.

== Crimean War ==
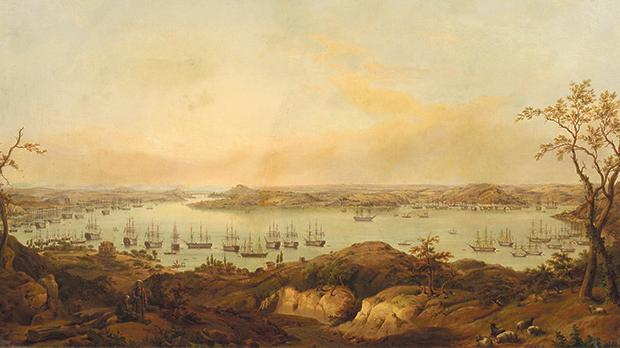
Queen and the Allied Fleets anchored in the Bosphorus, late 1853; the prelude to the Crimean war. Giuseppe Schranz

Queen was engaged in the Bombardment of Sevastopol on 17 October 1854 during the Crimean War under Captain Frederick Thomas Michell. She was set on fire three times and eventually forced to withdraw from the action. The famous Timothy the tortoise, who was about 160 years old when she [sic] died in 2004, was the ship's mascot during this time.

== Refitted ==
Between August 1858 and April 1859 Queen had an auxiliary steam engine fitted, and at the same time was cut down from three decks to two gun decks, and re-armed as an 86-gun ship. She was fitted with a Maudslay, Sons and Field 500 nhp engine and single screw propulsion. Now, being able to cruise at 10.5 knots (12.1 mph; 19.4 km/h), she was commissioned into the Mediterranean Fleet until 1864.

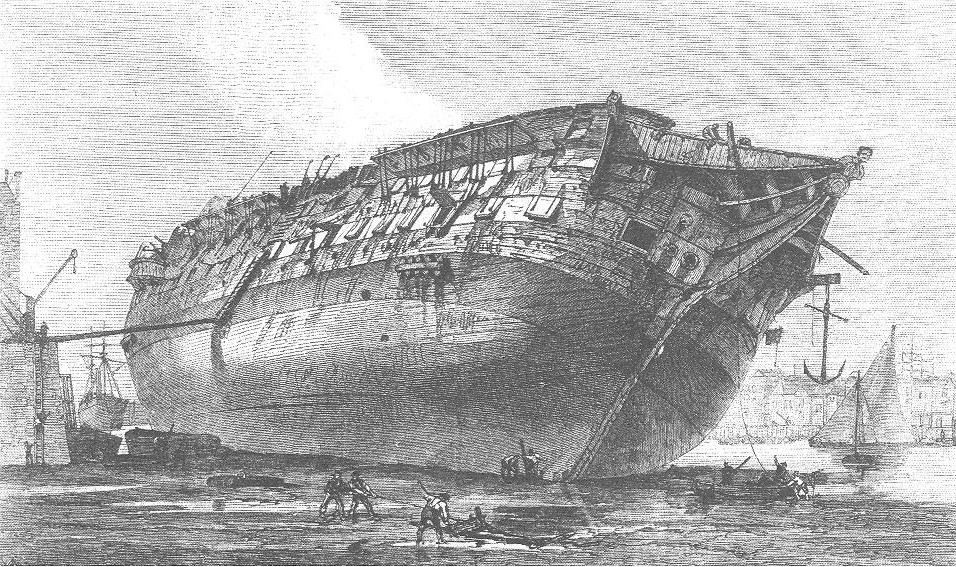
Breaking up of the ship

The ship was broken up in 1871 at Surrey Canal Wharf in Rotherhithe, on the River Thames.
