= Sindhora =

Sindhora Sindoda
- village
- Location within Madhya Pradesh Location within India
- Coordinates: 23.835307°N 77.252861°E
- Country: India
- State: Madhya Pradesh
- District: Bhopal
- Tehsil: Berasia

Population (2011)
  - Total: 1,716
- Time zone: UTC+5:30 (IST)
- PIN: 462420
- ISO 3166 code: MP-IN
- Census code: 482056

Sindhora is a village in the Bhopal district of Madhya Pradesh, India. It is located in the Berasia tehsil.

== Demographics ==
According to the 2011 census of India, Sindhora has 322 households. The effective literacy rate (i.e. the literacy rate of population excluding children aged 6 and below) is 64.63%.

Demographics (2011 Census)
	Total	Male	Female
Population	1716	862	854
Children aged below 6 years	240	123	117
Scheduled caste	557	283	274
Scheduled tribe	1	1	0
Literates	954	548	406
Workers (all)	867	449	418
Main workers (total)	222	203	19
Main workers: Cultivators	171	164	7
Main workers: Agricultural labourers	17	9	8
Main workers: Household industry workers	14	13	1
Main workers: Other	20	17	3
Marginal workers (total)	645	246	399
Marginal workers: Cultivators	5	1	4
Marginal workers: Agricultural labourers	633	241	392
Marginal workers: Household industry workers	0	0	0
Marginal workers: Others	7	4	3
Non-workers	849	413	436
