= Jeremiah Seed =

English clergyman and academic

Jeremiah Seed (1700–1747) was an English clergyman and academic.

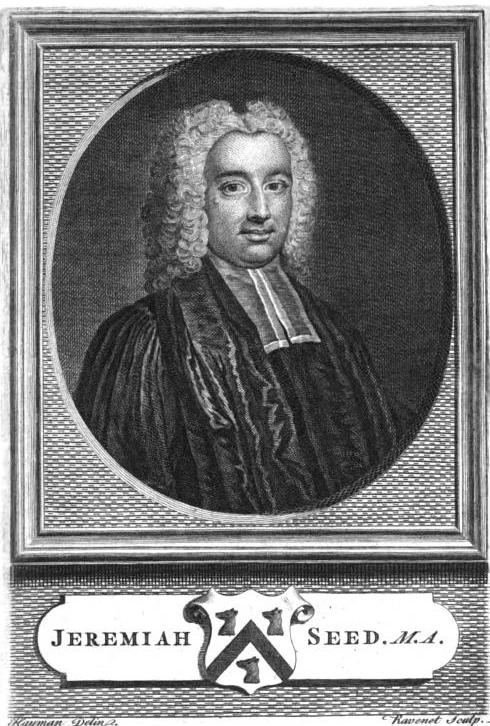
Jeremiah Seed, 1750 engraving by Simon François Ravenet, after Francis Hayman.

== Life ==
His father was Jeremiah Seed, who graduated B.A. from Jesus College, Cambridge, in 1682, and was rector of Clifton, Westmoreland, from 1707 until his death in 1722. Jeremiah Seed the younger was educated at Lowther grammar school, and matriculated on 7 November 1716 at The Queen's College, Oxford, proceeding B.A. on 13 February 1722, and M.A. 1725. He was chosen a fellow in 1732, and was for some years curate to Daniel Waterland, vicar of Twickenham, whose funeral sermon he preached on 4 January 1741. Seed was presented by his college in the same year to the rectory of Knight's Enham, Hampshire, where he remained until his death on 10 December 1747.

== Works ==
Seed was admired as a preacher. Samuel Johnson remarked that "he was not very theological" but had "a very fine style." Two sermons were published during his lifetime; others posthumously as Discourses (London, 1743; 6th, 1766). The Posthumous Works, consisting of sermons, essays, and letters, was edited by Joseph Hall, M.A., fellow of Queen's College, and was printed for M. Seed (possibly his widow), 1750, London, 2 vols. Other editions appeared, 2 vols., Dublin, 1750; London, 1770, 1 vol.; and the work is said to have been translated into Russian. In May of 1765 John Wesley recorded these glaring remarks about these works by “Mr. Seed” in his journal; “I was utterly surprised. Where did this man lie hid, that I never heard of him all the time I was at Oxford? His language is pure in the highest degree, is the apprehension clear, his judgment strong. And for true, manly wit, and exquisite turns of thought, I know not if this century has produced his equal.”

== Notes ==
Attribution

This article incorporates text from a publication now in the public domain: "Seed, Jeremiah". Dictionary of National Biography. London: Smith, Elder & Co. 1885–1900.
