= Frederick Thomas Michell =

Royal Navy officer and politician (1788–1873)

Vice-Admiral Sir Frederick Thomas Michell, KCB (8 April 1788 – 14 January 1873) was a Royal Navy officer and politician who served as the mayor of Totnes from 1855 to 1858.

== Life ==
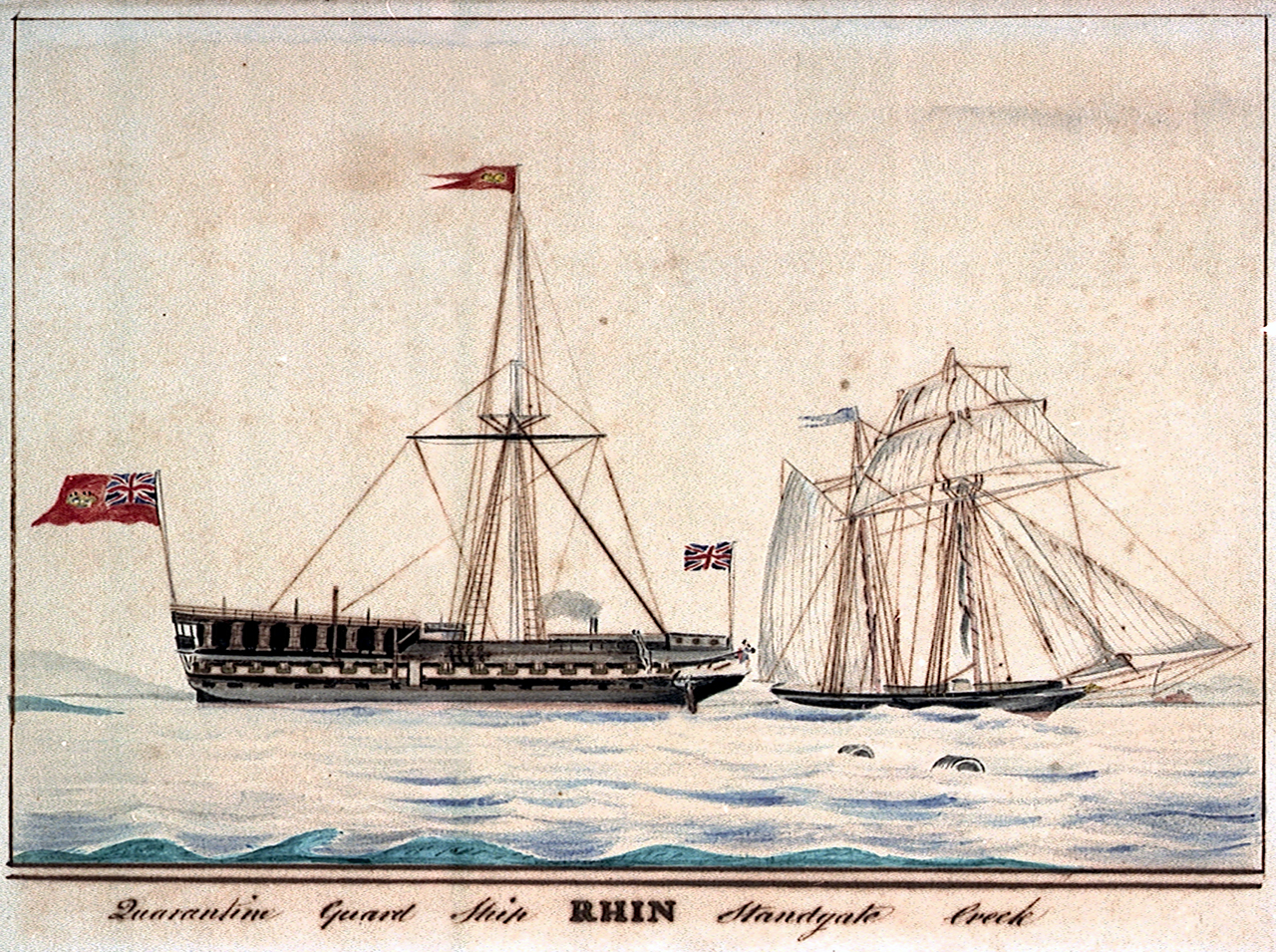
HMS Rhin (left), which Michell served on from 1809 to 1815

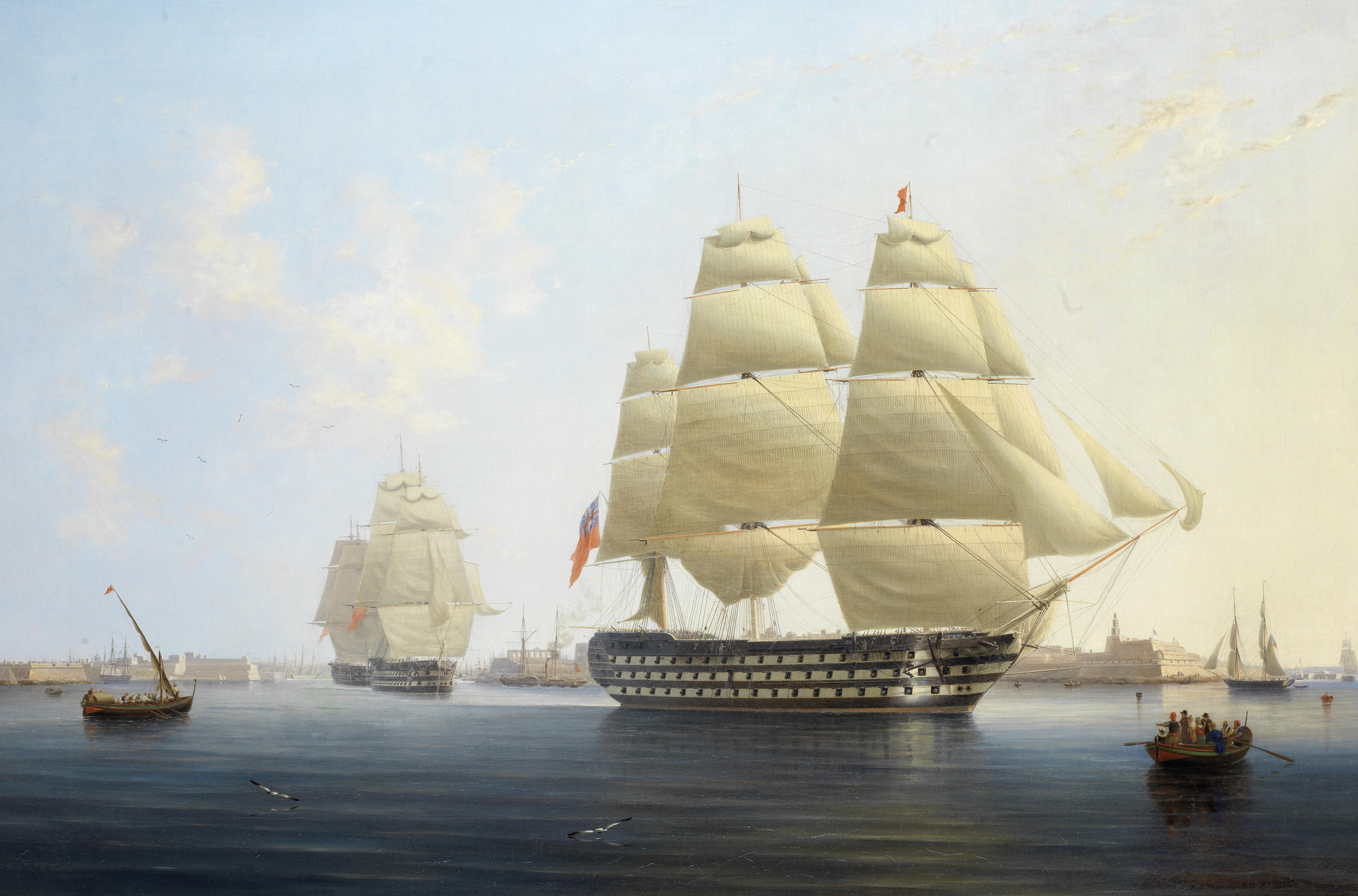
HMS Queen, which Michell captained during the Crimean War

Frederick Thomas Michell was born in Exeter, Devon, England on 8 April 1788. He was the son of Admiral Sampson Michell (1755–1809) and his wife Anne Shears (1755–1838). Michell was christened on 19 April at All Hallows on the Wall in Exeter (demolished in 1939). His younger brother was Charles Collier Michell.

In April 1800 he joined the Royal Navy. He trained at the Royal Navy Academy in Portsmouth 1800 to 1803. He then served in the Channel, African coast and Mediterranean on HMS Eurydice as a midshipman. In 1805 in the latter he helped to capture the 6 gun Spanish privateer "Mestuo le Solidad" under Captain William Hoste. In 1806 he joined HMS Termagant and the newly launched HMS Ocean under Lord Collingwood. He became a Lieutenant in May 1807 on HMS Ocean and soon after moved to HMS Active. In 1808 he was noted for his gallantry in the attack on the 16-gun brig-of-war "Friedland" in which he was wounded and received a compensation from the Patriotic Fund. From 1809 to 1815 he served on HMS Rhin. During this period in 1809, his father died in Rio de Janeiro and Frederick inherited his grandfather's estate.

In 1815, he began serving on the 104-gun HMS Queen Charlotte. In the latter in 1816 he served at the bombardment of Algiers and led the bombarding flotilla under Admiral Edward Pellew, 1st Viscount Exmouth. In December 1826 he was made commander of HMS Rifleman in place of William Carleton. He was promoted to captain in February 1830. In 1840 he became captain of HMS Magicienne and in August 1841 took command of HMS Inconstant. In 1852 he became captain of the 110-gun HMS Queen and on this ship took part in first phase of the siege of Sebastopol in the Crimean War. In this major conflict the ship was set on fire three times and forced to withdraw.

In 1855 he was senior officer under Lord Lyons and took the fleet to Kerch in the eastern Crimea. The same year he was promoted to rear admiral and was elected Mayor of Totnes and served this role for three years. In 1862 he was promoted to vice admiral. He retired in April 1866 aged 78. Queen Victoria made him a Knight Commander of the Order of the Bath in 1867. In the same year he was also given the Order of the White Eagle. In 1872 he received an extra pension from Greenwich Hospital for long service. He died at North Gate House in Totnes on 14 January 1873 aged 84.

== Family ==
In 1821 he married 16-year-old Jane ("Jenny") Prideaux Philips (1805–1824) in St Breock in Cornwall. They had two daughters: Louisa Whitbread Michell (1822–1902) and Caroline who died in infancy in 1823. Jenny died of consumption in Lostwithiel in 1824. In May 1826 he married another 16 year old, Caroline Frances Prideaux (1810–1856) at St Clement Danes in Westminster, London. In the 1861 census (at North Gate in Totnes) he was living with two teenage sisters, Louisa (18) and Emily Fyson (16) of Brighton who are described as his "Wards in chancery". His sister, Emma Carolina Michell, married Rev Sir John Stuart Page Wood. Their many children included Henry Evelyn Wood VC.

== Likenesses ==
A marble bust of Michell, in his capacity as mayor, stands in the Guildhall of Totnes.
