= Sampson Michell =

British Royal Navy officer

Sampson Michell (1755–1809) was a British Royal Navy officer who became an admiral and commander of the Portuguese Navy.

== Life ==
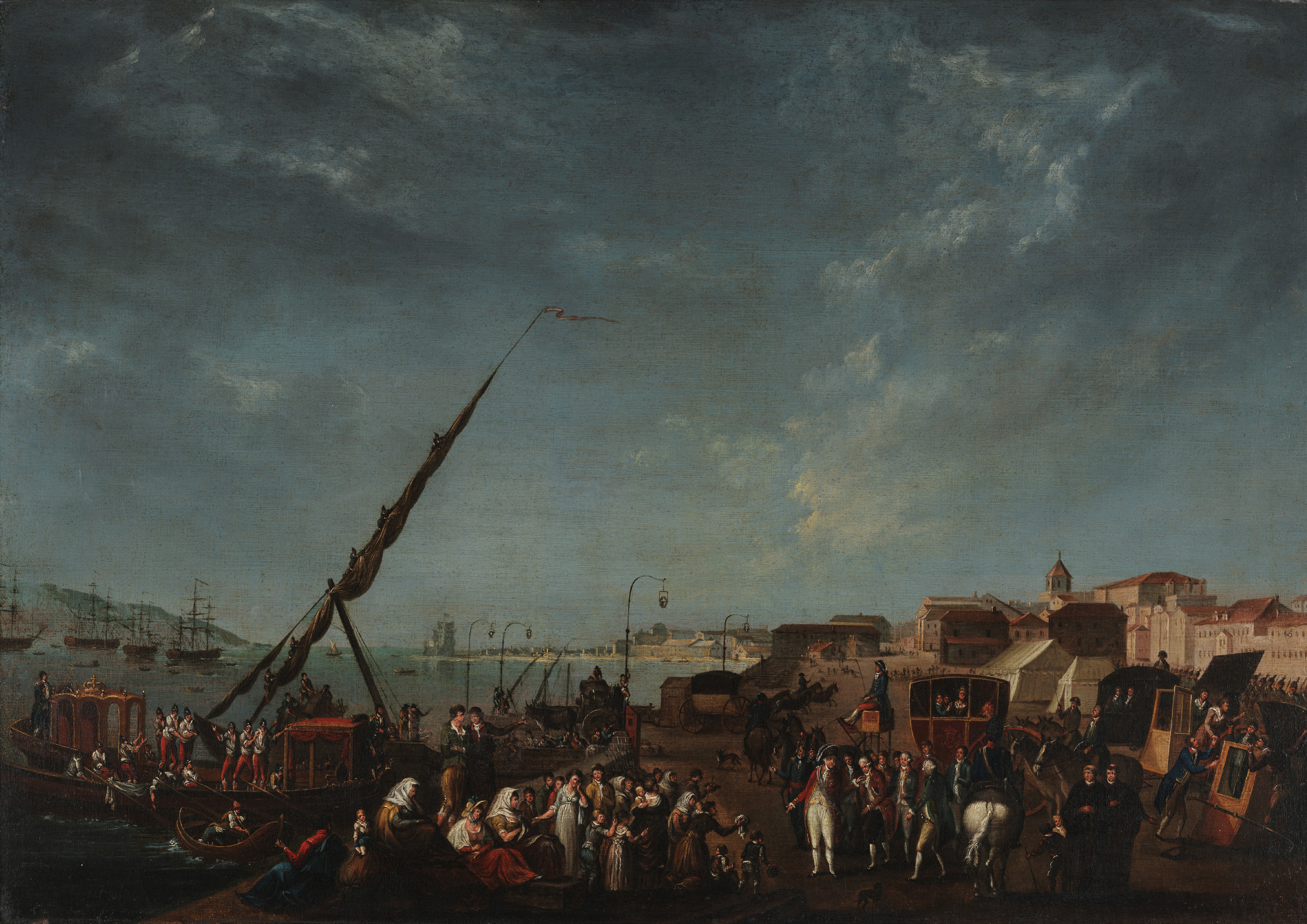
The Portuguese royal family embarking for Brazil

He was born in Truro in 1755 the son of Dr Thomas Michell MD (1726-1811) a "fox-hunting squire" in Cornwall, and his wife Jane Sprey (1728-1759). His mother died when he was only four. His paternal uncle appears to have been Admiral Reynell Michell and he chose ro join the Royal Navy.

He joined Admiral Howe's fleet as a lieutenant in August 1778. In 1790 he was serving as a lieutenant on the impressive 98-gun HMS St George under Sir George Collier.

He left the Royal Navy in 1790 (with consent of the Royal Navy) to join the Portuguese Navy and initially lived in Lisbon with his family. He left Portugal when the French invaded in 1807 and, after a brief time back in Cornwall, accompanied the King of Portugal in his exile to Brazil where he was given the rank of Admiral and stationed in Rio de Janeiro. He formed part of the flotilla containing the Portuguese Royal Family and many military and naval leaders which left Europe in December 1807 under command of Captain Graham Moore and arrived in Brazil in January 1808. Here the King promoted him to Commander-in-Chief of the Portuguese Navy in exile.

He died in Rio de Janeiro on 20 January 1809 aged 53 and is buried there in the Bastion.

== Family ==
In 1787 he married Ann Shears (1755-1838) and they lived at Croftwest in Cornwall.

They had two sons, Admiral Sir Frederick Thomas Michell and Charles Collier Michell, and four daughters including Emma Caroline Michell who married Rev. John Stuart Wood in 1820. Their children included Henry Evelyn Wood VC. Their daughter Anna Marie Michell (1791–1889) married Sir Benjamin Wood MP.
