= Katharine O'Shea =

English aristocrat (1846–1921)

Katharine Parnell
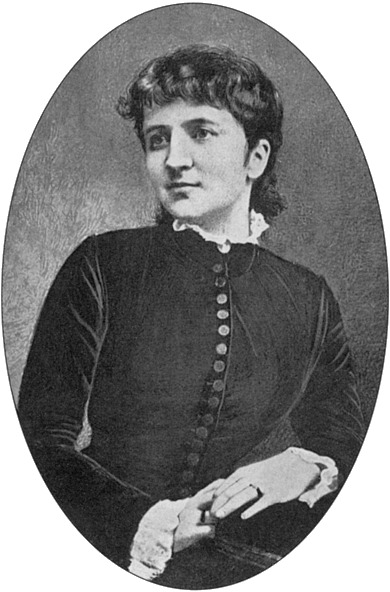
- Born: Katharine Wood; 30 January 1846; Braintree, Essex, England
- Died: 5 February 1921 (aged 75)
- Spouses: William O'Shea (m. 1867; div. 1890); Charles Stewart Parnell (m. 1891; died 1891)
- Children: 6

Katharine Parnell (née Wood; 30 January 1846 – 5 February 1921), known before her second marriage as Katharine O'Shea and popularly as Kitty O'Shea, was an English woman from a political family whose adulterous relationship with Irish nationalist Charles Stewart Parnell led to a widely publicised divorce in 1890 and his political downfall.

== Background ==
She was born in Braintree, Essex, on 30 January 1846, the daughter of Emma Caroline Wood and Sir John Page Wood, 2nd Baronet (1796–1866), and granddaughter of Sir Matthew Wood, a former Lord Mayor of London. She had an elder brother who became Field Marshal Sir Evelyn Wood and was also the niece of both Western Wood MP (1804–1863) and Lord Hatherley, Gladstone's first Liberal Lord Chancellor.

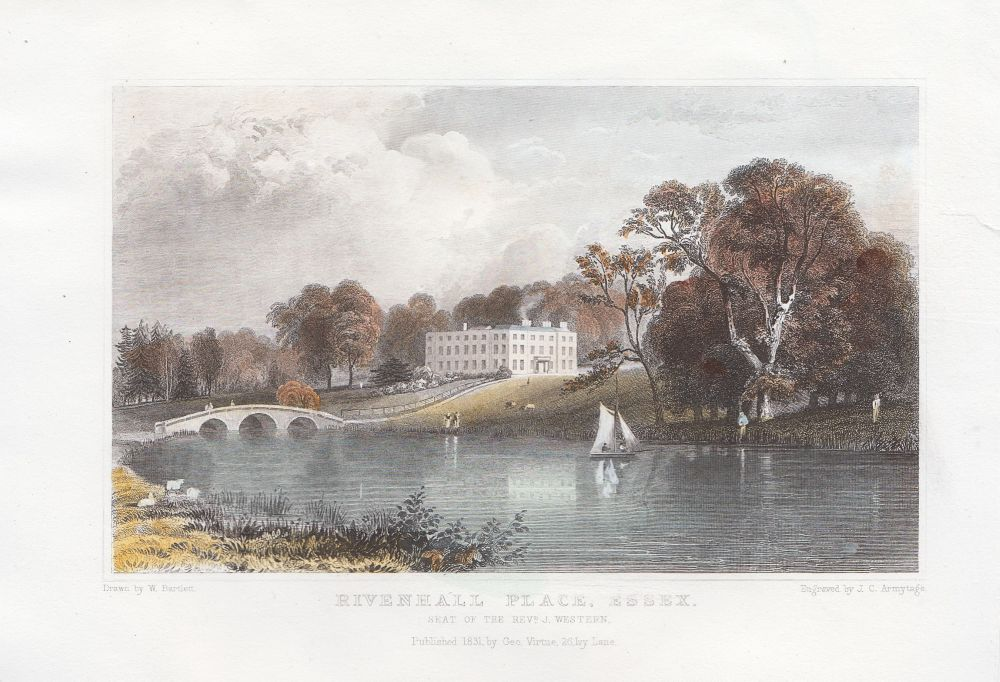
Rivenhall Place, 1831 engraving

Katharine Wood was brought up at the family home, Rivenhall Place, Rivenhall in Essex, with little formal education, but in an artistic and literary milieu.

== Early married life ==
In 1867, Katharine married Captain William O'Shea, later a Catholic Nationalist MP for County Clare, from whom she separated around 1875.

An important figure of this period of Katharine O'Shea's life was her widowed maternal great-aunt Anna Maria Wood née Michell (1792–1889); formerly married to Benjamin Wood (died 1845), a brother of Sir Matthew Wood, 1st Baronet, she was known in the family as "Aunt Ben". Aunt Ben published verse and translations. She rented a house in Brighton for the young couple, while William O'Shea settled debts, where their first child was born. She lived at Eltham Lodge, where she employed George Meredith as a weekly companion: he read aloud for her. The arrangement dated from 1868, at which time Meredith was campaigning for his friend Frederick Maxse.

During the mid-1870s, Katharine O'Shea took on the role of Aunt Ben's regular companion. She came to live at Wonersh Lodge, near Eltham Lodge, which Aunt Ben had bought for her.

== Relationship with Parnell ==
Katharine O'Shea first met Charles Parnell in 1880 and began an affair with him. Her ne'er-do-well husband William was embarking on a political career, to be launched by the suggestion from James Patrick Mahon that he and William O'Shea should stand together for the County Clare two-seat constituency, in the imminent general election. O'Shea was relying on Aunt Ben's money for his campaign, and Mahon's. By this point he was living at Albert Mansions, Victoria Street, London, and was often absent in Spain on business. He had Katharine's support for his entry into politics.

After William's success at the polls in spring 1880, Katharine played hostess at a political dinner for him in July at Albert Mansions, at which she met Parnell socially, other guests being Justin McCarthy and her sister the novelist Anna Caroline Steele. By October, she and Parnell had begun a relationship.

=== Political aspect ===
According to Paul Bew, Katharine soon had influence on Parnell's political views. After a significant Paris meeting in 1881 of the Irish National Land League, Parnell veered away from insurgency, and colleagues at the time attributed that to Katharine.

Through her family connection to the Liberal Party, Katharine acted as liaison between Parnell and Gladstone during negotiations prior to the introduction of the First Irish Home Rule Bill in April 1886. Parnell moved into her home at Wonersh Lodge that summer.

=== The love triangle ===
William O'Shea knew about the relationship. He challenged Parnell to a duel in July 1881 and forbade Katharine to see him. Her sister Anna Steele then worked to smooth things over. William sent Parnell an angry further note: the matter was allowed to drop, the couple having given meaningless assurances.

He kept quiet in public for several years, but the relationship was a subject of gossip in London political circles from 1881. As Katharine herself said in an interview with Henry Harrison after the publication of her memoirs:

Did Captain O'Shea know? Of course he knew.... There was no bargain; there were no discussions; people do not talk about such things. But he knew, and he actually encouraged me at all times.

In 1888, when Aunt Ben was taking medical opium for pain, and changed her will to benefit Katharine, her brothers Charles Page Wood and Evelyn Wood attempted to have Aunt Ben ruled "of unsound mind". Katharine brought in Sir Andrew Clark, 1st Baronet, physician to W. E. Gladstone, who went to see Aunt Ben at Eltham on 7 April. With Clark's report, she headed off the petition by her brothers. On her death later that year, Aunt Ben left Katharine O'Shea a fortune of £140,000; probate took three years, as family members contested the will. F. S. L. Lyons took a critical view of Katharine's attitude to this impending death: the love triangle in which Katharine became involved was prolonged, for around a decade, and he expressed the view that "the reason behind it was Katharine's anxiety to lay hands on the whole of her aunt's [sic] legacy." In the end, Katharine settled the probate matter out of court, in 1892, for 50% of the legacy.

=== Divorce, scandal and reputations ===
Later public knowledge of the affair created a major scandal. William O'Shea filed for divorce in 1889. The proceedings, in which Parnell was named as co-respondent, led to Parnell being deserted by a majority of his Irish Parliamentary Party and to his downfall as its leader in December 1890. Catholic Ireland felt a sense of shock when Katharine broke the vows of her previous marriage by marrying Parnell on 25 June 1891. With both his political life and his health essentially ruined, Parnell died in her arms of pneumonia. His death took place at the age of 45 on 6 October 1891 in Hove, less than four months after their marriage.

== Later life ==
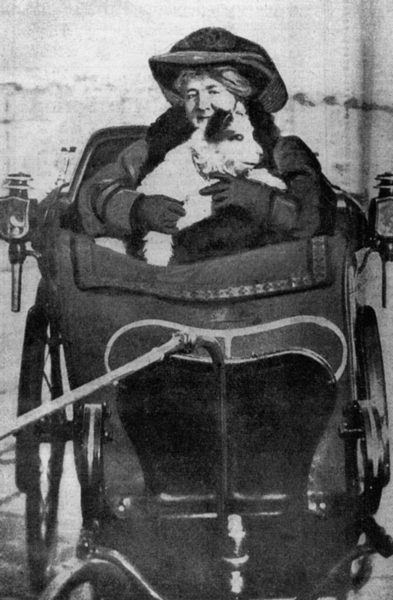
O'Shea in 1914

Though to her friends she was known as 'Katie', Parnell's enemies and the press called her "Kitty O'Shea". She lived the rest of her life in relative obscurity and is buried in Littlehampton, West Sussex, England.

== Historiography ==
Katharine Parnell published a biography of Parnell in 1914 as "Katharine O'Shea (Mrs. Charles Stewart Parnell)".

Henry Harrison, who had acted as Parnell's bodyguard and aide-de-camp, devoted himself after Parnell's death to the service of his widow, Katharine. From her he heard a different version of the events surrounding the divorce from that which had appeared in the press, and this was to form the basis of his two books defending Parnell published in 1931 and 1938. They had a major impact on Irish historiography, leading to a more favourable view of Parnell's role in the O’Shea affair.

== Children ==
The children of William O'Shea with Katharine were:

- Gerard William Henry O'Shea (1870–1943), married in 1896 Anna Christabel Barrett Lennard.
- Mary Norah O'Shea (1873–1903).
- Anna Maria del Carmen O'Shea (1874–1921), married, firstly in 1897 Dr Arthur Herbert Buck. After divorce in 1915, she married secondly in 1915 Sir Edward Lingard Lucas, 3rd Baronet.

Three of Katharine's children were fathered by Parnell; the first, Claude Sophie, died early in 1882. After the divorce, the court awarded custody of the two surviving daughters to William O'Shea. Mediation by Anna Steele, brokering custody of the daughters, led to Katharine and William O'Shea sharing in Aunt Ben's legacy.

Her daughter by Parnell, Claire O'Shea (1883–1909), married Bertram Sydney Osmund Maunsell, and their only son, Assheton Clare Bowyer-Lane Maunsell (1909–34), died of enteric fever while serving with the British Army in India. Katharine’s other daughter by Parnell, Katharine O'Shea (1884–1947), married Louis D'Oyley Morsford Moule of the East Lancashire Regiment; she died in an asylum.

== Depictions ==
In the film Parnell (1937), O'Shea was played by Myrna Loy. Phyllis Calvert played her in Parnell for Play of the Week (1959). In the television miniseries Parnell and the Englishwoman (1991), she was played by Francesca Annis.
