= Hubbard (surname) =

Hubbard is an English surname. The name is a variant of the surnames Hobart, Hubbert, and Hubert. These surnames are derived from personal names, such as the Old German Hugibert and Hubert, which are composed of the elements hug ("heart", "mind", "spirit") and berht ("bright", "famous"). Early forms of the surname include filius Huberti (in 1066), Hubert (in 1199), Huberd and Hubert (in 1230), and Hoberd (in 1291).

== People with the surname ==
- Aidan Hubbard (born 2003), American football player
- Al Hubbard (disambiguation), multiple people
- Alfred Hubbard (disambiguation), multiple people
- Alice Moore Hubbard (1861–1915), American feminist
- Allan Hubbard (disambiguation), multiple people
- Archie Hubbard (1883–1967), English footballer
- Arthur Hubbard (1911–1972), English footballer
- Arthur J. Hubbard Sr. (1912–2014), American senator and Navajo code talker
- Asahel W. Hubbard (1819–1879), American politician
- Barbara Burke Hubbard (born 1948), American science writer
- Barbara Marx Hubbard (1929–2019), American writer
- Bela Hubbard (1814–1896), American geologist, surveyor
- Bernard R. Hubbard (1888–1962), American explorer, lecturer and priest
- Bertha Crawford Hubbard (1861–1935), American artist
- Bray Hubbard, American football player
- Bruce Hubbard (1952–1991), American singer
- Bryce Hubbart (born 2001), American baseball player
- Cal Hubbard (1900–1977), American professional football player and Major League Baseball umpire
- Carroll Hubbard (1937–2022), American politician
- Charles Hubbard (disambiguation), multiple people
- Chester D. Hubbard (1814–1891), American politician
- Chris Hubbard (born 1991), American football player
- Chuba Hubbard (born 1999), Canadian-born American football player and current running back for the Carolina Panthers
- Cliff Hubbard (1911–1962), English footballer
- Conrad Hubbard, role-playing game writer, poet and professional web designer
- Cora Hubbard (1887–19??), American bank robber
- David Hubbard (disambiguation), multiple people
- Dean L. Hubbard (born 1939), American educator
- DeHart Hubbard (1903–1976), American athlete
- Demas Hubbard Jr. (1806–1873), American politician
- Diana Hubbard (born 1952), American musician
- Dick Hubbard (born 1946), New Zealand businessman and politician
- Dominic Hubbard, 6th Baron Addington (born 1963), British politician
- Eddie Hubbard (1917–2007), American disc jockey
- Edward Hubbard (1937–1989), English architectural historian
- Edward L. Hubbard (born 1938), American air force officer
- Egerton Hubbard, 2nd Baron Addington (1842–1915), British politician
- Elbert Hubbard (1856–1915), American philosopher and writer
- Elbert H. Hubbard (1849–1912), American politician
- Elizabeth Hubbard (1933–2023), American actress
- Elizabeth Hubbard (Salem witch trials) (1675-?), accuser in Salem witchcraft trials
- Elizabeth Wright Hubbard (1896–1967), American physician
- Erica Hubbard (born 1979), American actress
- Esme Hubbard (1880–1951), British actor
- Evelyn Hubbard (1852–1934), British politician
- Frank Hubbard (1920–1976), American harpsichord maker
- Freddie Hubbard (1938–2008), American jazz trumpeter
- Freeman H. Hubbard (1894–1981), American writer
- Gardiner Greene Hubbard (1822–1897), the founder and first president of the National Geographic Society
- Geoffrey Hubbard (1923–1998), British educator
- George Hubbard (1867–1931), English rugby union player
- Glenn Hubbard (disambiguation), multiple people
- Gurdon Saltonstall Hubbard (1802–1886), American fur trader, insurance underwriter and land speculator
- Harlan Hubbard (1900–1988), Kentucky writer and artist
- Harold Hubbard (1883–1953), English bishop
- Harry Hubbard (1903–1942), American naval officer
- Henry Hubbard (1784–1857), American politician
- Henry D. Hubbard (1870–1943), American standards officer, creator of a 1920s Periodic Table.
- Henry Guernsey Hubbard (1850–1899), American scientist
- Henry Vincent Hubbard (1875–1945), American landscape architect
- Homer C. Hubbard (1885–1955), American football coach
- Howard James Hubbard (1938–2023), U.S. Catholic bishop
- Jack Hubbard (disambiguation), multiple people
- Jaime Hubbard (born 1962), American actress
- James Hubbard (disambiguation), multiple people
- Jeff Hubbard, American bodyboarder
- Jeremy Hubbard (born 1972), American news anchor
- Jerry Reed Hubbard (1937–2008), American musician
- Jesse Hubbard (born 1975), American lacrosse player
- Joe Hubbard, Alabama politician
- Joel Douglas Hubbard (1860–1919), American politician
- John Hubbard (disambiguation), multiple people
- Johnny Hubbard (1930–2018), South African footballer
- Jon Hubbard (born 1946), American politician
- Jonathan Hatch Hubbard (1768–1849), American politician
- Jordan Hubbard (born 1963), co-founder of the FreeBSD operating system project
- Joseph Stillman Hubbard (1823–1863), American astronomer
- Josh Hubbard (born 2004), American basketball player
- Julian Hubbard (born 1955), British clergyman
- Kenneth Hubbard (1920–2004), British pilot
- Kin Hubbard (1868–1930), American cartoonist, humorist, and journalist
- L. Ron Hubbard (1911–1986), American writer and creator of Scientology
- Lafayette Ron Hubbard Jr., known as Ronald DeWolf (1934–1991), son and critic of L. Ron Hubbard
- Laurel Hubbard (born 1978), New Zealand weightlifter
- Lawrence Hubbard, American artist
- Leigh Hubbard, Australian union official
- Leonard Hubbard, American musician
- Leonidas Hubbard (1872–1903), American journalist and adventurer
- Leverett Hubbard (1723–1793), justice of the New Hampshire Supreme Court
- Levi Hubbard (1762–1836), American politician
- Louisa Hubbard (1836–1906), English feminist
- Lucien Hubbard (1888–1971), Producer and screenwriter
- Lucius Frederick Hubbard (1836–1913), American politician
- Mabel Gardiner Hubbard (1857–1923), wife of Alexander Graham Bell
- Marian E. Hubbard (1868–1956), American zoologist
- Marian Hord Hubbard (1874 - 1959), American suffragist
- Marv Hubbard (1946–2015), American football player
- Mary Sue Hubbard (1931–2002), wife of L. Ron Hubbard
- Matt Hubbard, American writer
- Matt Hubbard (musician) (born 1970), American musician
- Mike Hubbard (disambiguation), multiple people
- Nancy Hubbard (born 1963), American author and professor of business and management
- Neil Hubbard (born 1948), British guitarist
- Neilson Hubbard (born 1972), American musician
- Nicholas L. Hubbard (1895–1983), American farmer, businessman, and politician
- Old Mother Hubbard (criminal) (1828-1???), Irish-American criminal
- Orville L. Hubbard (1903–1982), American politician
- P. M. Hubbard (Philip Maitland Hubbard, 1910–1980), British writer
- Pamela Hubbard, American politician
- Paul Hubbard (disambiguation), multiple people
- Phil Hubbard (born 1956), American basketball player
- Phil Hubbard (footballer) (born 1949), English footballer
- Philip Hubbard (disambiguation), multiple people
- Polly Hubbard (1907–1963), First wife of L. Ron Hubbard
- Quentin Hubbard (1954–1976), son of L. Ron Hubbard
- Ray Wylie Hubbard (born 1946), American country music singer
- Raymond Hubbard, 4th Baron Addington (1884–1971), British peer
- Richard Hubbard (disambiguation), multiple people
- Richie Hubbard (1932–2011), Canadian politician
- Rob Hubbard (born 1955), British composer
- Rudy Hubbard (born 1946), American football coach
- Ruth Hubbard (1924–2016), American biologist
- Sam Hubbard (born 1996), Former American football player for the Cincinnati Bengals
- Samuel Hubbard (disambiguation), multiple people
- Sara Hubbard (1924–1997), Second wife of L. Ron Hubbard
- Shirley Hubbard (1885–1962), English footballer
- Stanley Hubbard (born 1933), American billionaire heir and businessman
- Stephen Hubbard (born 1952), American retired English language teacher
- Susan Hubbard, American writer
- Susan S. Hubbard, American geophysicist
- Theodora Kimball Hubbard (1877–1935), American librarian
- Thomas Hubbard (disambiguation), multiple people
- Tom Hubbard (born 1950), Scottish poet
- Trenidad Hubbard (born 1966), former Major League Baseball outfielder
- Tyler Hubbard (born 1987), American musician
- Vikki Hubbard (born 1989), English athlete
- Wesley James Hubbard, American musician
- Will Hubbard (1895–1969), British WWI flying ace
- William Hubbard (disambiguation), multiple people

== Fictional characters ==
- Miss Rebecca Hubbard, a character in the British TV series Postman Pat
- The protagonist in the nursery rhyme "Old Mother Hubbard"

== See also ==
- Hubbard (disambiguation), a disambiguation page for "Hubbard"
