= Alfred Hubbard =

Alfred Hubbard may refer to:

- Alfred Hubbard (mayor) (c. 1812–1887), alderman and mayor of Brisbane Municipal Council
- Alfred Matthew Hubbard (1901–1982), early proponent for the drug LSD during the 1950s
- Alfred J. Hubbard (1902–1976), managing director of the printers Perkins Bacon & Co.

== See also ==
- Al Hubbard (disambiguation)
- Allan Hubbard (disambiguation)
