= Ruth Hubbard (Girl Guides) =

English Girl Guide leader

Hon. Ruth Hubbard
- Born: 30 October 1896; Westminster, London
- Died: 23 August 1955 (aged 58); Addington, Buckinghamshire
- Occupations: Girl Guide leader Mayoress of Buckingham
- Father: Egerton Hubbard, 2nd Baron Addington

The Hon. Ruth Hubbard (30 October 1896 – 23 August 1955) was a Girl Guide leader and six times Mayoress of Buckingham. She was a recipient of the Silver Fish Award, Girl Guiding’s highest adult honour.

== Personal life ==
Ruth Mary Hubbard was the youngest daughter of Egerton Hubbard, 2nd Baron Addington and Mary Adelaide Portal. The family home was Seven Gables in the village of Addington, Buckinghamshire. She attended schools in Aldeburgh, Suffolk and West Drayton, Middlesex.

She was a devout Christian, regularly attending St. Mary’s Church in Addington. She also supported the Free Churches and the Buckingham Corps of the Salvation Army, occasionally preaching at Buckingham’s Army Hall. She served as Secretary of the Buckingham Church Union in the early 1930s.

Hubbard was a keen gardener, supporting the Buckingham and District Horticultural Society. In 1933 in order to protect her crops, she "destroyed 1,020 cabbage butterflies”. She also bred pedigree rabbits and was the President of the Buckingham Beekeepers' Association.

She was well travelled. She visited South Africa in 1921. In 1927-8 she travelled to Shanghai to meet her brother, Rt. Hon. Lord Addington, who had been Custodian of Enemy Property in China for four years. They returned to the UK via Japan, Korea, Honolulu, mainland USA and Canada. She also travelled to Russia and Denmark, and, following WWII, to Oberammergau, Germany, after which she reported that "at one stage there were French, German and British in the same railway compartment and one of them remarked how wonderful it was that they should all be travelling together as friends once again".

Hubbard died at home following a heart attack on 23 August 1955. In her will she left the majority of her estate (over £20,000) to her companion of 20 years, Annie Lisbeth McKenzie, who had nursed Hubbard’s mother in the final year of her life, subsequently becoming Hubbard’s housekeeper, secretary and chauffeuse. Hubbard in turn nursed McKenzie through ill health, giving her "unfailing attention and care". They attended church together and supported the work of the Salvation Army and the Red Cross.

== War service ==
During WWI Hubbard was a nurse. During WWII she was a warden’s messenger for the A.R.P., secretary of Buckingham’s National Savings Movement, a volunteer for the Parcels Scheme and helped the elderly and infirm with hospital transport. She was a member of Winslow’s British Red Cross Detachment 88, which involved welcoming repatriated POWs to RAF Westcott, which was in operation between 1942 and 1946.

=== Fundraising ===
She was an organising secretary for Buckingham’s 1941 War Weapons Week fundraiser, which raised £168,040. In 1944 the village of Addington raised £3,219 for Salute the Soldier week, having set an initial target of £350.

== Girl Guides ==
Hubbard was in charge of the Addington and Buckingham Girl Guides from 1918. From 1918 to 1924 she was a District Commissioner for Buckinghamshire, becoming Division Commissioner for Buckinghamshire North from 1924 to 1927. In 1927 until at least 1933 she was the Assistant Division Commissioner for all of Buckinghamshire. Whilst in South Africa and Shanghai she took a "keen interest" in the work of the local Girl Guides' Associations. In 1930 she donated the District Shield to the Buckingham Girl Guides, to be awarded annually for the "best Guide work". She herself was a recipient of the Silver Fish Award, the Girl Guide movement’s highest adult honour, in 1918. Towards the end of WWII, she was appointed by the Home Office to introduce Girl Guiding to Aylesbury’s Borstal Institution, now HM Prison Aylesbury.

== Community service ==
Amongst the many organisations that Hubbard supported were the St John Ambulance and Nursing Association, the Women’s Institute, Buckingham’s District Nursing Association, Northampton Hospital, Buckingham Hospital (founded by Hubbard’s family) and the Mothers' Union. She volunteered for the Winslow Red Cross "Not So Young" Club and was a member of the Buckingham Friendship Club. Over a period years she hosted youth camps at her home, and in 1936 opened it to hospital patients after a fire at Buckingham Hospital.

Other community roles included:

- 1934 – chair, Winslow Branch of the National Society for the Prevention of Cruelty to Children (NSPCC)
- 1934-38 – Vice-president, Winslow Women’s Institute (WI), and a member of the WI Education Committee
- 1938 – Member, Winslow Branch of the North Bucks Women’s Conservative Association, becoming vice president in 1939
- Late 1930s to 1945 – Standard Bearer and Vice President, Buckingham Women’s Section of the British Legion, becoming president from 1945 to 1946
- 1940s – chair, Buckingham District Nursing Association
- 1950 – chair, Buckingham Branch of the United Nations Association

=== Holiday camps for mothers ===
Hubbard was active in improving the welfare of mothers from London’s slums. Together with Lady Addington, she organised a series of holiday camps for mothers at her home, attended by members of the Mothers' Union of St. Mary’s, Somers Town, London. She would lead twice-daily prayers and also acted as Medical Officer.

== Public service ==
Hubbard was Mayoress of Buckingham six times, in conjunction with her brother, the Rt. Hon. Lord Addington, who was elected Mayor from 1932 to 1934, 1943-6 and 1951–2. Her brother was unmarried and asked Hubbard to take the role on. During her first term as Mayoress, an ox-roast drew protest from passionate vegetarian George Bernard Shaw, and saw her name mentioned in the satirical magazine Punch. She was appointed a Justice of the peace for the Borough of Buckingham in 1939. In 1945 she was outspoken about the lack of female representation on Buckingham Borough Council, pointing out that Buckingham "lagged behind the times". She stood in place of her brother, and became Buckingham’s first Councillor-Mayoress, and one of the first woman to serve on Buckingham Borough Council. In 1946 she was appointed a representative on Buckingham District Council under the Education Act and served on the Old People’s Welfare Committee. In 1949 she was elected to represent Addington on the Winslow Conservative Branch Committee.
