= Philip Hubbard =

Philip Hubbard may refer to:

- P. M. Hubbard (1910–1980), British writer
- Philip G. Hubbard (1921–2002), African American university professor and administrator
- Phil Hubbard (born 1956), American former basketball player
- Phil Hubbard (footballer) (born 1949), English former footballer
- Phil Hubbard (academic) (born 1969), British geographer and sociologist
