= John Hubbard =

John or Jack Hubbard may refer to:

== Public officials ==
- John Hubbard (Maine politician) (1794–1869), American physician, educator and Democratic legislator
- John F. Hubbard (1795–1876), New York politician
- John F. Hubbard Jr. (1822–?), New York politician
- John Henry Hubbard (1804–1872), American legislator
- John Hubbard, 1st Baron Addington (1805–1889), English financier
- John Hubbard (admiral) (1849–1932), American naval officer
- John Hubbard, 3rd Baron Addington (1883–1966), English legislator and administrator

== Scholars ==
- John R. Hubbard (1918–2011), American educator, historian and diplomat
- John Hubbard (physicist) (1931–1980), English physicist
- John H. Hubbard (born 1945), American mathematician and educator

== Sportspeople ==
- Jack Hubbard (American football) (1886–1978), American college football player
- Johnny Hubbard (1930–2018), South African footballer
- Jack Hubbard (rugby union), English international rugby union player
- Jack Hubbard (rugby league), Australian rugby league player

== Others ==
- John Hubbard (convict) (1839–after 1888), British clerk convicted of forgery and deported to Western Australia in 1865
- John Hubbard (actor) (1914–1988), American actor
- John Hubbard (artist) (1931–2017), American painter

== See also ==
- Hubbard (surname)
- Jon Hubbard, American politician
