= Gallaudet Bison football =

American college football team

- First season: 1883; 143 years ago
- Athletic director: Warren Keller
- Head coach: Stefan LeFors; 1st season, 0–0 (–)
- Location: Washington, D.C.
- Stadium: Hotchkiss Field (capacity: 1,500)
- Conference: SCAC
- Colors: Buff and blue
- All-time record: 159–367–2 (.303)

Conference championships
- 3 (2013, 2022, 2023)
- Website: gallaudetbison.com/football

The Gallaudet Bison football team represents Gallaudet University in National Collegiate Athletic Association (NCAA) Division III competition and is a member of the Southern Collegiate Athletic Conference. It has been discontinued many times, and most recently restarted in 2007. After an undefeated season in 2005, the first time such a season was achieved in the program's 122-year history, head coach Ed Hottle began his campaign to return Gallaudet to the NCAA ranks. With support from the Gallaudet administration, the Bison played their last season of club football in 2006 and played a full NCAA slate of eight games in 2007.

The home stadium, Hotchkiss Field, was known as Garlic Field prior to 1924.

== History ==
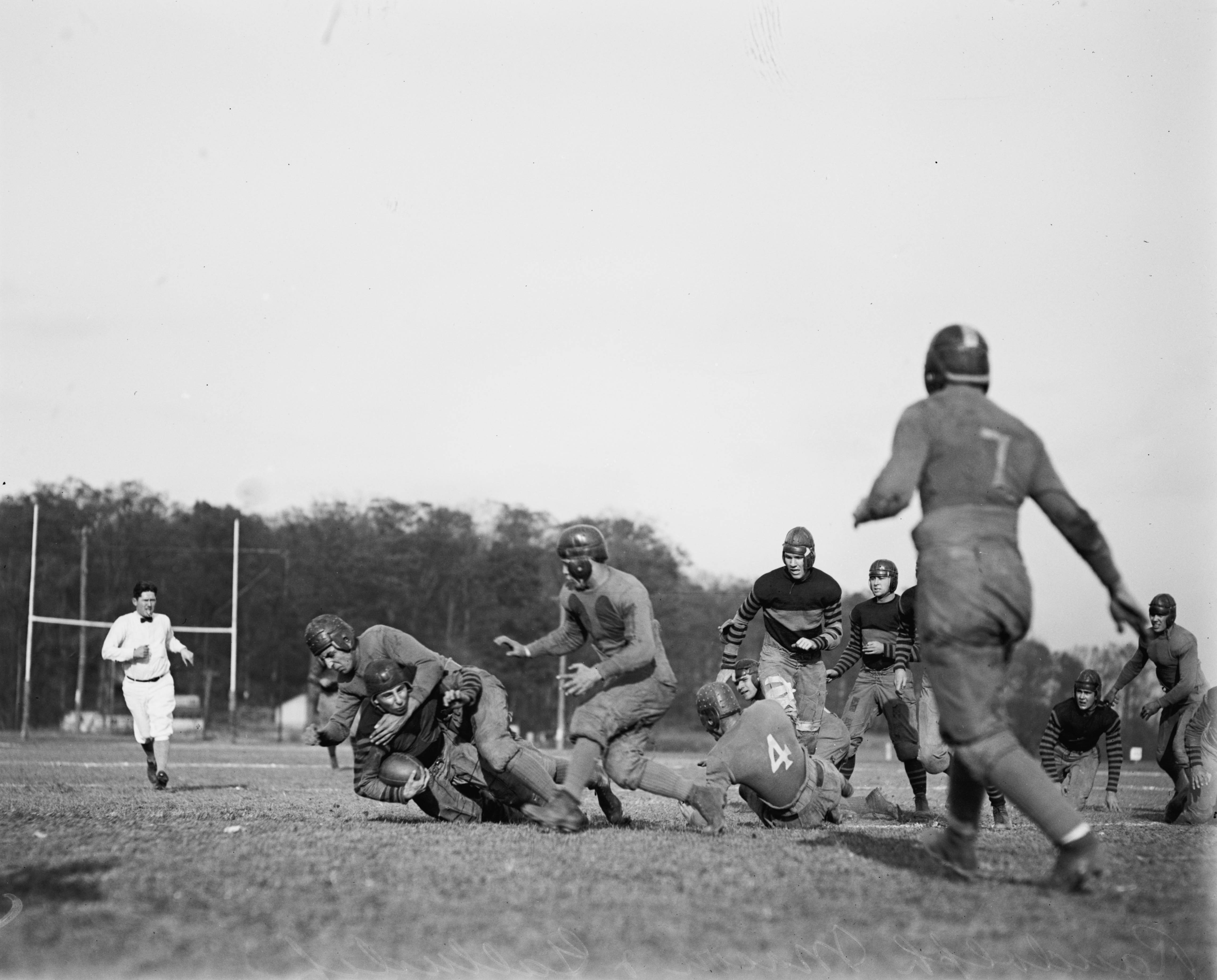
A Gallaudet game in 1923

The football team was organized in 1883 by coach John B. Hotchkiss. In the 1890s, the football huddle originated at Gallaudet when the team noticed that their opponents were trying to see and read their signs in order to try to guess their plays. To remedy this, quarterback Paul D. Hubbard had his players form a circle so that his sign language signals could be sent and received without anyone on the sidelines or on the opposing team seeing.

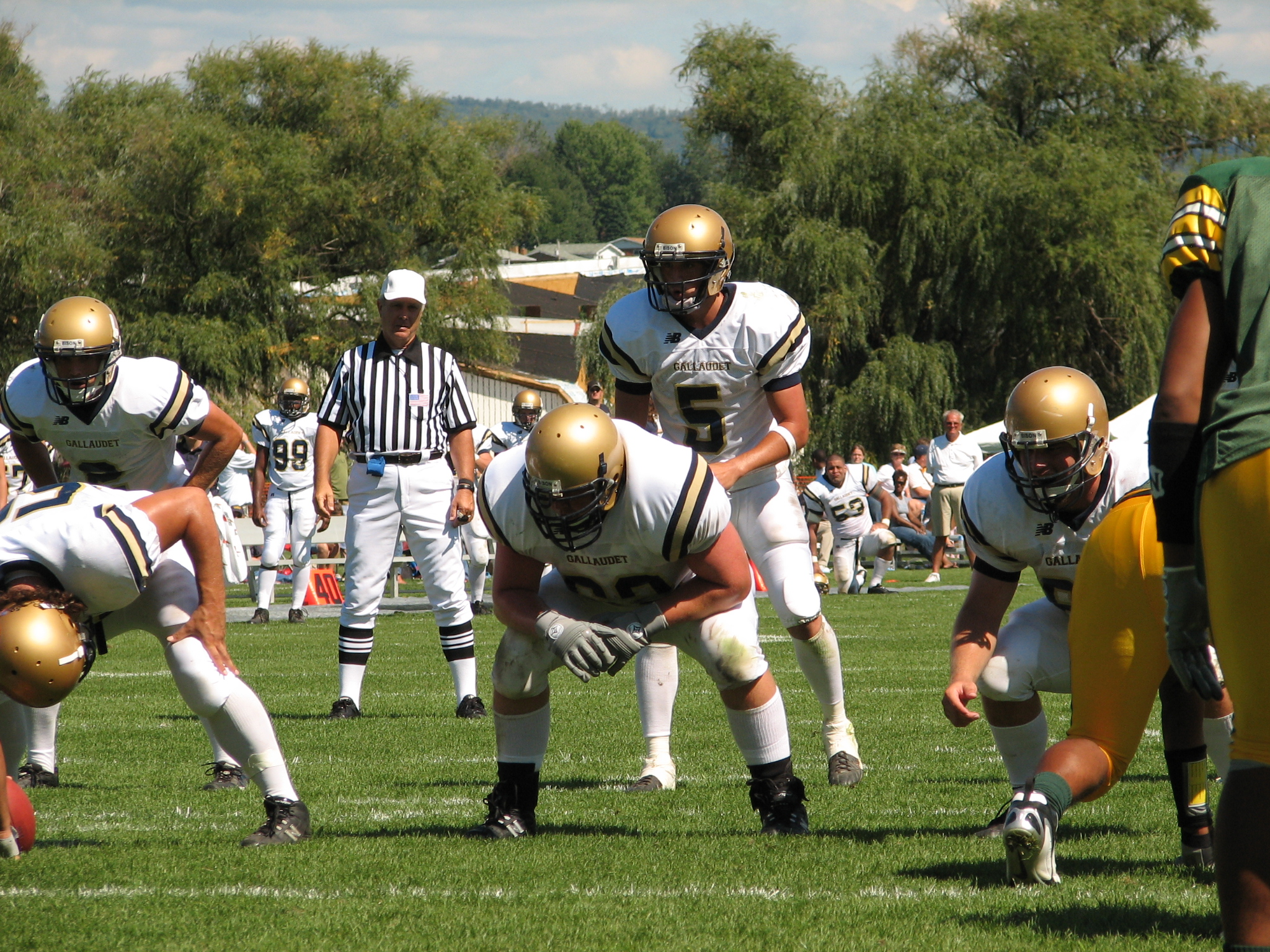
Gallaudet football game in 2007

After the 2009 football season, Coach Hottle left to become the first head coach of the first football team at Stevenson University. He announced his decision in a heart-felt meeting with the football team. Offensive Coordinator Chuck Goldstein was tapped to be the interim head coach of the football team. On December 17, 2009, the interim tag was removed and he became the permanent head coach of the team through 2024.

In the fall of 2013, Gallaudet's football program began a remarkable run for the Division III playoffs and garnering a considerable amount of publicity, winning the regular season with a 9–1 record, before falling to Hobart College in the first round of the playoffs and ending the season with a 9–2 (.818) overall record.

== Championships ==
=== Conference championships ===
Gallaudet claims three conference titles, the most recent of which came in 2023.

Year	Conference	Overall Record	Conference Record	Coach
2013†	Eastern Collegiate Football Conference	9–2	6–1	Chuck Goldstein
2022	Eastern Collegiate Football Conference	7–3	5–1	Chuck Goldstein
2023†	Eastern Collegiate Football Conference	4–5	3–1	Chuck Goldstein

† Co-champions

== Postseason games ==
=== NCAA Division III playoff games ===
Gallaudet has appeared in the Division III playoffs twice, with an overall record of 0–2.

Year	Round	Opponent	Result
2013	First Round	Hobart	L, 7–34
2022	First Round	Delaware Valley	L, 0–59

== Hall of Fame ==
The following football players have been inducted into the Gallaudet Athletics Hall of Fame.

- George Andree
- Hume Le Prince Battiste
- Lou Byouk
- Richard Caswell
- Albert Couthen
- Scott Cuscaden
- Dewey Deer
- Race Drake
- Louis Dyer
- Bernie Fairwood
- Edward Foltz
- Charles Hammack
- Paul D. Hubbard
- Frederick Hughes
- John Jacobs
- Richard Jacobs
- John Kaleta
- Ernest Langenberg
- James Macfadden
- Charles Marshall
- Bilbo Monaghan
- Frederick Moore
- Bill Ramborger
- John Ringle
- Lester Rosson
- James Segala
- Vincent Silvestri
- Shannon Simon
- Frank Turk
- Robert Westermann
- Franklin Willis
- Darnell Woods
- John Wurdemann

== Rivalries ==
Gallaudet University's football team has a longstanding rivalry with Catholic University of America, another school in the Washington D.C. area. On September 7, 2012, Gallaudet University defeated Catholic University of America for the first time in the 106-year history of the rivalry between the two D.C. schools.
