= Samuel Hubbard =

Samuel Hubbard may refer to:

- Samuel Birdsey Hubbard (1833–1903), American businessman
- Samuel Decius Hubbard (1833–1910), Wisconsin legislator
- Samuel Dickinson Hubbard (1799–1855), Connecticut congressman and United States Postmaster General
- Samuel H. Hubbard, American college basketball and football coach
- Samuel T. Hubbard Jr. (1884–1962), cotton industry executive and military intelligence officer
- Samuel Hubbard (Massachusetts judge) (died 1847), judge on the Massachusetts Supreme Judicial Court

== See also ==
- Sam Hubbard (born 1995), American football defensive end
