= James Hubbard =

James or Jim Hubbard may refer to:

- Jim Hubbard (baseball) (1884–1932), American baseball player
- James Hubbard (rower) (1906–1960), American Olympic rower
- James Hubbard, 5th Baron Addington (1930–1982), British peer
- James Hubbard (murderer) (1930–2004), American murderer, sentenced to death by the state of Alabama in 1977, executed in 2004
- James W. Hubbard (born 1948), American politician in the Maryland House of Delegates
- Jim Hubbard (born 1949), New Zealand cartoonist
- James E. Hubbard Jr. (born 1951), American mechanical engineer
- James Hubbard (darts player) (born 1992), English darts player
