= Thomas Hubbard =

Thomas Hubbard or Tom Hubbard may refer to:

- Thomas H. Hubbard (1781–1857), American lawyer, judge and U.S. Representative from New York
- Thomas Jefferson Hubbard (1806–1877), Oregon pioneer and politician who was acquitted of murder charges
- Thomas Hamlin Hubbard (1838–1915), Union Army colonel from Maine during the Civil War
- Thomas Hubbard (British politician) (1898–1961), British coal miner and politician
- Thomas C. Hubbard (born 1943), diplomat and United States Ambassador to the Philippines, 1996–2000, and South Korea, 2001–04
- Tom Hubbard (born 1950), writer and first librarian of the Scottish Poetry Library
- Tommy Hubbard, music producer
- Thomas Hubbard (historian), American historian of homosexuality in Ancient Greece

== See also ==
- Thomas Hubbard Sumner (1807–1876), sea captain
- Thomas Hubbard Vail (1821–1889), first Episcopal Bishop of Kansas
- Cape Thomas Hubbard, a headland located in the northern Canadian territory of Nunavut
- Hubbard (surname)
