= Stefan LeFors =

American gridiron football player (born 1981)

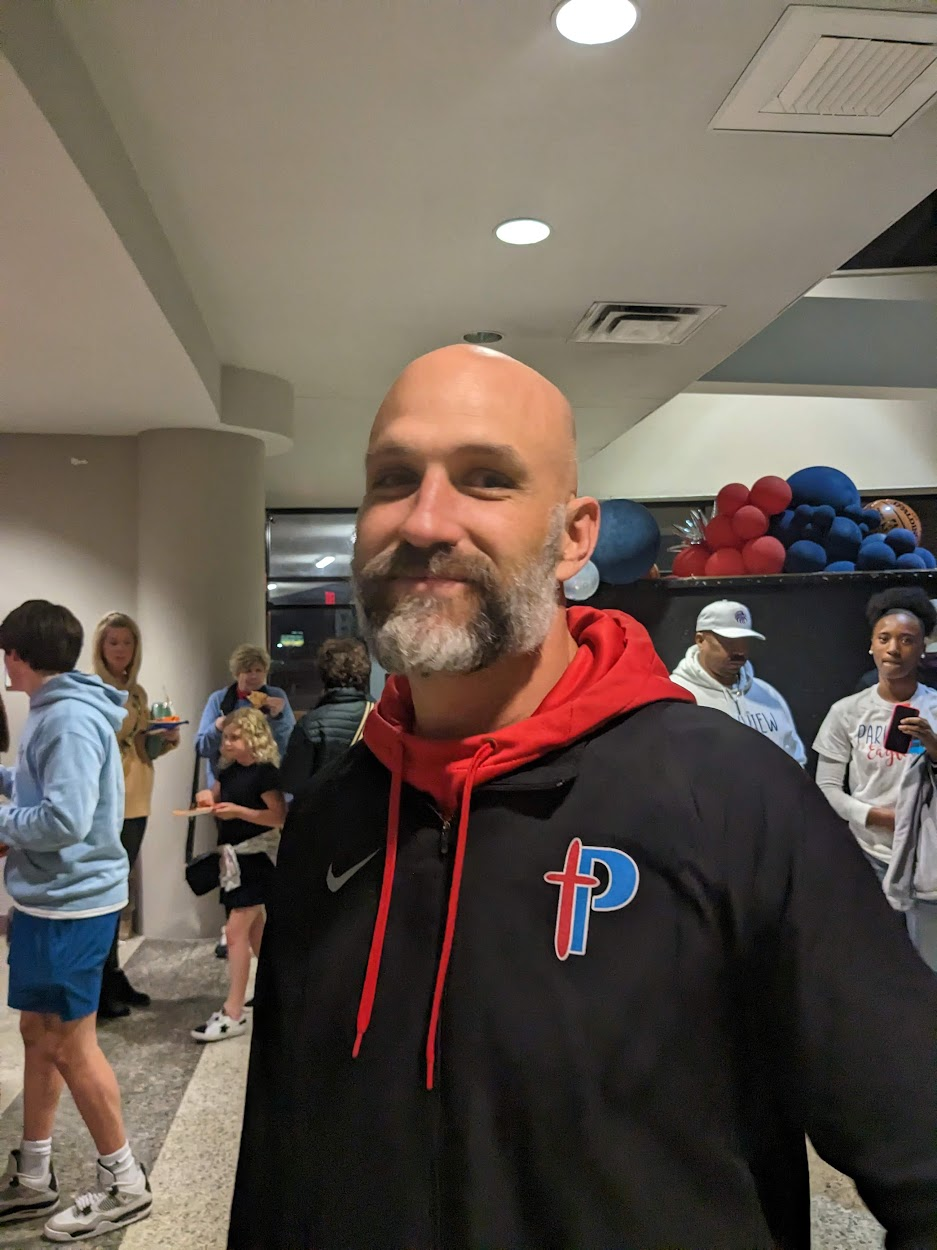
- LeFors in 2023

Current position
- Title: Head coach
- Team: Gallaudet
- Conference: SCAC
- Record: 1–8

Biographical details
- Born: June 7, 1981 (age 45); Baton Rouge, Louisiana, U.S.
- Education: University of Louisville

Playing career
- 2001–2004: Louisville
- 2005–2006: Carolina Panthers
- 2007–2008: Edmonton Eskimos
- 2009: Winnipeg Blue Bombers
- Position: Quarterback

Coaching career (HC unless noted)
- 2011–2018: Christian Academy (KY)
- 2019–2024: Parkview Baptist HS (LA)
- 2025–present: Gallaudet

Head coaching record
- Overall: 1–8 (college); 131–44 (high school)

Accomplishments and honors

Awards
- C-USA Co-Offensive Player of the Year (2004); Sammy Baugh Trophy (2004)

Stefan LeFors (born June 7, 1981) is an American college football coach and former professional quarterback. He is the head football coach for Gallaudet University, a position he has held since 2025. He played college football for Louisville and was drafted in the fourth round of the 2005 NFL draft to the Carolina Panthers. He also played for the Edmonton Eskimos and Winnipeg Blue Bombers of the Canadian Football League (CFL).

After LeFors' players career ended he served as the head football coach for Christian Academy of Louisville from 2011 to 2018 and Parkview Baptist High School from 2019 to 2024.

== College career ==
LeFors attended Christian Life Academy in Baton Rouge, Louisiana. In 2003, LeFors became the starting quarterback for the Louisville Cardinals football team. In 2004, LeFors started every game that season. LeFors ranks as the 4th all-time leading passer at the University of Louisville with 5,853 yards & first in pass completion percentage with 66%.

In 2004, he narrowly missed breaking Daunte Culpepper's season-record completion percentage with 73.5 to Culpepper's 73.6. He led Louisville that season to an 11–1 season in which they finished 6th in the final AP Poll (the highest finish in school history) and won the Liberty Bowl. Louisville was the only D-1A (now FBS) university to recruit LeFors out of high school as a quarterback.

LeFors was redshirted as a freshman in 2000 and served as a backup to Dave Ragone in 2001 and 2002. In 2003, he took over as a starter, throwing for 3,145 passing yards and 17 touchdowns, and was named 1st team All-Conference USA Quarterback in both 2003 and 2004.

He was also named Conference Player of the Year in 2004 and named a finalist for the Johnny Unitas Golden Arm Award as a senior. LeFors participated in the East–West Shrine Game (college all-stars) and was named Offensive Player of the Game.

== Professional career ==
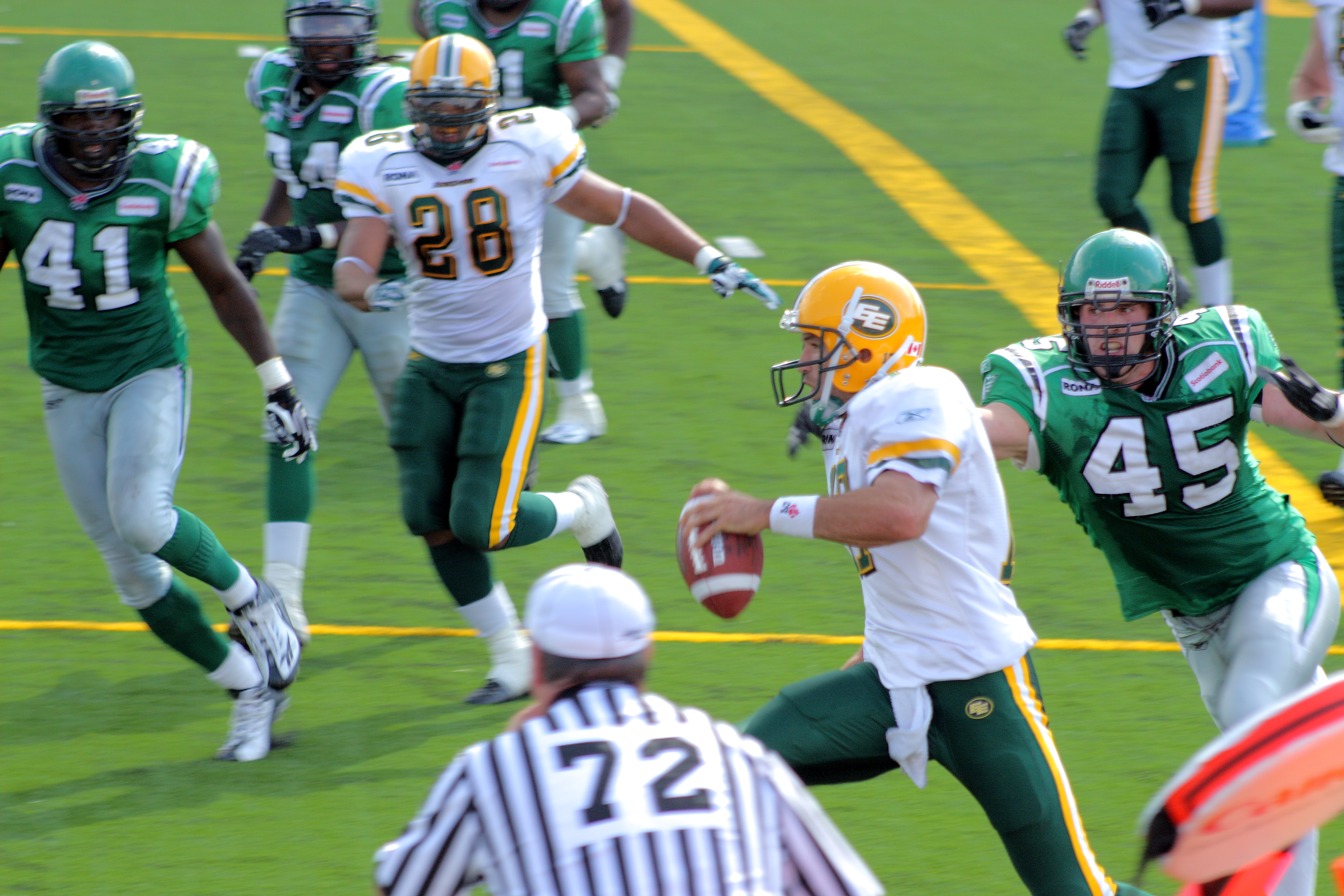
LeFors with the Edmonton Eskimos in 2007

LeFors was selected by the Carolina Panthers in the fourth round (121st overall pick) of the 2005 NFL draft out of the University of Louisville. After serving one season in a backup role, he was released by the Panthers in September 2006. LeFors conducted workouts for the Tampa Bay Buccaneers, Minnesota Vikings, Seattle Seahawks, Buffalo Bills, Detroit Lions, Oakland Raiders, and Denver Broncos but was not offered a contract.

In December 2006, LeFors was signed by the Edmonton Eskimos of the CFL as an import player. He was the backup quarterback for the team's 2007 season, but had the opportunity to start 5 games at the end of the season because of Ricky Ray's shoulder injury. By the end of the 2007 CFL regular season, LeFors was placed 8th in the league in passing yardage with 1193 yards, as well as 6 touchdowns and 8 interceptions, while completing 60.8% of his passes.

He was 7th in quarterback rushing yardage with 204 yards and 2 touchdowns. His best performance of the season came in week 18 against Saskatchewan. In a losing effort, he managed to complete 34/48 passes for 412 yards 3 touchdowns and 1 interceptions, while scrambling 6 times for 31 yards. According to head coach Danny Maciocia, LeFors shares the job as 2nd string quarterback on the Eskimo depth chart for the 2008 campaign with Jason Maas.

On January 21, 2009, LeFors was traded to the Winnipeg Blue Bombers for a second-round pick in the 2009 CFL draft and a conditional selection in 2010. Then on June 18, 2009, LeFors was named Winnipeg's starting quarterback for the start of the 2009 season. In the offseason preceding the 2010 CFL season, LeFors retired from the CFL.

== Post-playing career ==
LeFors returned to Louisville and took a position with the U of L athletic department, also serving as a color analyst for the U of L radio network during the 2010 football season.

In May 2011, he was named the new head football coach at Christian Academy of Louisville, He led the Centurions to the Kentucky Class AA title in 2016 and 2018. In eight seasons, his career record as a head coach was 84–20.

In 2019, LeFors resigned from Christian Academy to accept the position as head football coach at Parkview Baptist School in his hometown of Baton Rouge, Louisiana. Through the 2024 season, LeFors led the Eagles to a record of 47–24 in six seasons with playoff appearances in each season, making it to the state quarterfinals in four of those seasons.

In April 2025, LeFors was chosen to succeed Chuck Goldstein as the head football coach for Gallaudet University.

== Personal life ==
LeFors is a child of deaf adults; his parents (Larry and Susan), as well as his brother Eric, are deaf. As a result, LeFors is fluent in American sign language. LeFors and his wife, Joy, have two children (Luke and Ella).

== Head coaching record ==
=== College ===
Year	Team	Overall	Conference	Standing	Bowl/playoffs
Gallaudet Bison (Old Dominion Athletic Conference) (2025)
2025	Gallaudet	1–8	1–7		
Gallaudet Bison (Southern Collegiate Athletic Conference) (2026–present)
2026	Gallaudet	0–0	0–0		
Gallaudet:		1–8	1–7		
Total:		1–8			

=== High school ===
Year	Team	Overall	Conference	Standing	Bowl/playoffs
Christian Academy of Louisville Centurions () (2011–2018)
2011	Christian Academy of Louisville	8–5	5–0	1st	
2012	Christian Academy of Louisville	7–4	5–0	1st	
2013	Christian Academy of Louisville	9–2	6–0	1st	
2014	Christian Academy of Louisville	10–2	6–0	1st	
2015	Christian Academy of Louisville	10–3	3–0	1st	
2016	Christian Academy of Louisville	14–1	3–0	1st	
2017	Christian Academy of Louisville	11–3	2–1	2nd	
2018	Christian Academy of Louisville	15–0	3–0	1st	
Christian Academy of Louisville:		84–20	33–1		
Parkview Baptist Eagles () (2019–2024)
2019	Parkview Baptist	5–6	3–4	4th	
2020	Parkview Baptist	7–3	5–2	3rd	
2021	Parkview Baptist	7–5	5–3	5th	
2022	Parkview Baptist	10–3	4–2	3rd	
2023	Parkview Baptist	10–3	5–1	2nd	
2024	Parkview Baptist	8–4	5–1	2nd	
Parkview Baptist:		47–24	27–13		
Total:		131–44			
National championship Conference title Conference division title or championship game berth

== See also ==
- List of NCAA major college football yearly passing leaders
