= Glenn Hubbard =

Glenn Hubbard may refer to:

- Glenn Hubbard (baseball) (born 1957), American baseball player
- Glenn Hubbard (economist) (born 1958), American academic specializing in tax policy and health care

== See also ==
- Hubbard (surname)
