= David Hubbard =

David Hubbard may refer to:

- David Hubbard (politician) (1792–1874), U.S. Representative from Alabama
- David Allan Hubbard (1928–1996), President of Fuller Theological Seminary and Old Testament scholar
- David A. Hubbard (born 1955), American football player, author and pastor
- David A. Hubbard Jr., American speleobiologist and geologist
