= Catholic–Gallaudet rivalry =

American college sports rivalry

- Sport: Football, basketball
- Teams: Catholic University; Gallaudet
- First meeting: 1906 (football)
- Latest meeting: September 7, 2012; Gallaudet 47, Catholic 27

Statistics
- Total meetings: 26 (football)
- All-time series: Catholic, 23–1–2 (football)
- Largest victory: Catholic, 91–0 (1931, football)
- Current win streak: Gallaudet, 1 (2012, football)

Locations in Washington, D.C.

The Catholic–Gallaudet rivalry is a rivalry in both football and basketball between the Catholic University Cardinals and Gallaudet Bison. Both institutions are based in Washington, D.C.

The two teams have met in football only three times since 1994, but prior to that is a lengthy, one-sided rivalry. The series dates back to 1906. In 2012, Gallaudet defeated Catholic 47–27 for its first ever victory in the series.

The basketball series dates back to 1911.

== Football ==
Gallaudet victories	Catholic victories	Tie games

No.	Date	Location	Winning team		Losing team	
1	November 24, 1906	Kendall Green	Catholic	7	Gallaudet	0
2	October 31, 1914	Brookland	Tie	0	Tie	0
3	November 25, 1915	Georgetown Field	Catholic	28	Gallaudet	0
4	November 9, 1918	Brookland	Gallaudet	9	Catholic	0
5	November 1, 1919	Brookland	Tie	0	Tie	0
6	October 30, 1920	Brookland	Catholic	13	Gallaudet	7
7	November 21, 1925	Brookland	Catholic	60	Gallaudet	0
8	October 9, 1931	Brookland	Catholic	91	Gallaudet	0
9	November 5, 1949	Brookland	Catholic	33	Gallaudet	13
10	November 4, 1950	Brookland	Catholic	33	Gallaudet	0
11	1972		Catholic	14	Gallaudet	8
12	1973		Catholic	13	Gallaudet	0
13	1974		Catholic	27	Gallaudet	12
14	1975		Catholic	41	Gallaudet	0
15	1976		Catholic	50	Gallaudet	12
16	1977		Catholic	22	Gallaudet	0
17	1978		Catholic	38	Gallaudet	0
18	1979		Catholic	37	Gallaudet	0
19	September 26, 1981		Catholic	23	Gallaudet	21
20	September 25, 1982		Catholic	24	Gallaudet	11
21	1991		Catholic	32	Gallaudet	24
22	1992		Catholic	44	Gallaudet	11
23	1993		Catholic	61	Gallaudet	0
24	1994		Catholic	64	Gallaudet	0
25	October 17, 2009	Hotchkiss Field	Catholic	38	Gallaudet	13
26	September 9, 2011	Hotchkiss Field	Catholic	45	Gallaudet	41
27	September 7, 2012	Cardinal Stadium	Gallaudet	47	Catholic	27
Series: Catholic leads 23–2–2

== See also ==
- List of NCAA college football rivalry games
