= John B. Hotchkiss =

American football coach and professor

Biographical details
- Born: August 22, 1845; Seymour, Connecticut, U.S.
- Died: November 3, 1922 (aged 77); Washington, D.C., U.S.
- Education: Gallaudet

Coaching career (HC unless noted)
- 1883: Gallaudet

John Burton Hotchkiss (August 22, 1845 – November 3, 1922) was an American college football coach and professor. He was deaf since the age of 9, and attended Gallaudet University, where later he was the first coach of the Gallaudet Bison football team. He is the namesake of their football field. Hotchkiss was also a writer; one of the founders and editors of the Silent World, a short-lived paper for the deaf. Hotchkiss taught English and history.

John B. Hotchkiss signing Memories of Old Hartford (1913)

== Early years ==
Hotchkiss became deaf due to meningitis or scarlet fever. He attended the American School for the Deaf in Hartford, the first permanent school for the deaf in the country.
