= William Hubbard =

William Hubbard, Will Hubbard, or Bill Hubbard may refer to the following people:

(Chronological order by birth date when known)

== Politicians ==
- William Hubbard (clergyman) (1621–1704), English minister and historical writer in colonial America
- William Hubbard (New Brunswick politician) (1751–1813), lawyer, judge and politician in New Brunswick, Canada
- William Blackstone Hubbard (1795–1866), American politician and Freemason
- William Peyton Hubbard (1842–1935), Canadian politician
- William Pallister Hubbard (1843–1921), American legislator
- William Henry Hubbard (1886–1960), Canadian aviator
- Will Hubbard (1895–1969), English aviator and World War I flying ace
- William Hubbard (1888-1917), British soldier lost in World War I at the Battle of Arras, commemorated in "The Ballad of Bill Hubbard" by Roger Waters
- William DeHart Hubbard (1903–1976), American long jumper, first African-American to win an Olympic gold medal in an individual event
- Wilbur V. "Bill" Hubbard (1907–1986), American football, basketball, baseball, and golf coach
- William C. Hubbard, American lawyer and law school dean
- William F. Hubbard, musician and composer

== See also ==
- Hubbard (surname)
