= Dominic Hubbard, 6th Baron Addington =

British politician and life peer (1963)

The Right Honourable The Lord Addington
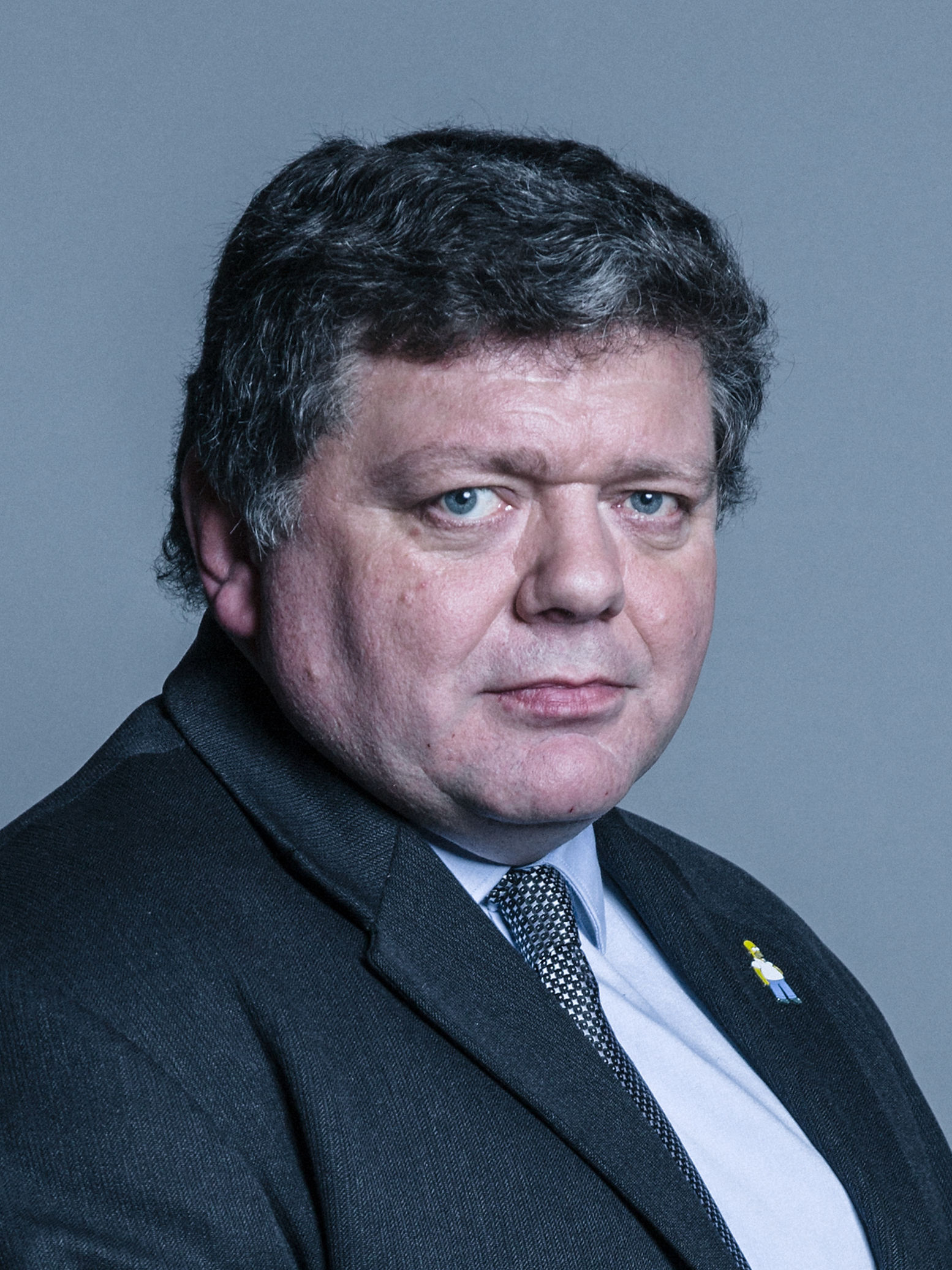
- Official portrait, 2018

Member of the House of Lords Lord Temporal
- Incumbent
- Life peerage 18 February 2026
- Elected hereditary peer 11 November 1999 – 29 April 2026
- Election: 1999
- Preceded by: Seat established
- Succeeded by: Seat abolished
- Hereditary peerage 17 June 1986 – 11 November 1999
- Preceded by: The 5th Baron Addington
- Succeeded by: Seat abolished

Personal details
- Born: 24 August 1963 (age 63)
- Party: Liberal Democrat
- Spouse: Elizabeth Ann (née Morris)
- Children: Eleanor Eugenie
- Parents: James Hubbard, 5th Baron Addington (father); Alexandra Patricia Millar (mother)
- Education: University of Aberdeen
- Occupation: Politician

Dominic Bryce Hubbard, 6th Baron Addington, Baron Hubbard (born 24 August 1963), is a British politician, the president of the British Dyslexic Association, and the vice-president of the UK Sports Association. A member of the Liberal Democrats, he has been a member of the House of Lords from 1986.

== Early life ==
Addington was educated at The Hewett School, Norwich, and Norwich City College, before going up to the Aberdeen University, graduating as M.A. in 1988.

== Career ==
He succeeded to the title of Baron Addington, of Addington, Co. Buckingham, at the death of his father, James Hubbard, 5th Baron Addington, a former British South Africa Police officer, in 1982. On taking up his seat at 22 he was the youngest serving peer in the House of Lords.

Lord Addington was returned as one of the ninety elected representative hereditary peers in Parliament in 1999. He sits on the Liberal Democrat benches in the House of Lords and is party spokesperson for sport, a member of the education team specialising in special educational needs, and is himself dyslexic. He is currently the longest-serving Liberal Democrat member of the House of Lords. He captains the Commons and Lords rugby and football team, and has played in Parliamentary World Cup competitions from 1995 to 2023. While attending University, Lord Addington played for Scottish universities and played rugby league for Scottish students.

As part of the 2025 Political Peerages, he was created a life peer, as Baron Hubbard, of Lambourne in the Royal County of Berkshire on 18 February 2026.

== Personal life ==
In 1999, Addington married Elizabeth Ann Morris, only daughter of Michael Morris, of Duxbury Park, Chorley, Lancashire. Lord and Lady Addington live in Lambourn, West Berkshire.

The heir presumptive to the title is his younger brother, the Hon. Michael Hubbard (who by his wife Emmanuella née Ononye has a son, Oliver).

== Arms ==
Coat of arms of Dominic Hubbard, 6th Baron Addington
Crest In front of a fasces fessewise Proper an eagle's head as in the arms. Escutcheon Vert a chevron engrailed plain cotised Argent between three eagles' heads erased of the second each gorged with a collar fleurettée Gules Supporters On either side an eagle Argent wings addorsed gorged with a collar fleurettée Gules and pendent therefrom an escutcheon Ermine charged with a rose Gules Motto Alta Petens (Latin for: Seeking Higher Things)

== See also ==
- Baron Addington

Peerage of the United Kingdom
Preceded by James Hubbard	Baron Addington; 1982–present Member of the House of Lords (1982–1999)	Incumbent; Heir presumptive: Hon. Michael Hubbard
Parliament of the United Kingdom
New office created by the House of Lords Act 1999	Elected hereditary peer to the House of Lords under the House of Lords Act 1999; 1999–2026	Office abolished under the House of Lords (Hereditary Peers) Act 2026
