= Richard Hubbard =

Richard or Dick Hubbard may refer to:

- Richard D. Hubbard (1818–1884), United States Representative and governor of Connecticut
- Richard B. Hubbard (1832–1901), governor of Texas
- Richie Hubbard (1932–2011), Canadian politician
- Dick Hubbard (born 1946), New Zealand businessman and politician

== See also ==
- Hubbard (surname)
