= Baron Addington =

Title in the Peerage of the United Kingdom

Baron Addington, of Addington in the County of Buckingham, is a title in the Peerage of the United Kingdom. It was created on 22 July 1887 for the businessman and Conservative Member of Parliament, John Hubbard. He was head of the firm of John Hubbard & Co and also sat as a Member of Parliament for Buckingham and the City of London. His eldest son, the second Baron, was a partner in the family firm and represented Buckingham in the House of Commons as a Conservative. He was succeeded by his eldest son, the third Baron. He was three times Mayor of Buckingham. On the death of his younger brother, the fourth Baron, the line of the eldest son of the first Baron failed. The title passed to their first cousin once removed, the fifth Baron. He was the grandson of Cecil John Hubbard, third son of the first Baron. As of 2018, the title is held by his eldest son, the sixth Baron. He is one of the ninety elected hereditary peers that remain in the House of Lords after the passing of the House of Lords Act of 1999. Lord Addington sits on the Liberal Democrat benches.

In 2026, the 6th baron was created Baron Hubbard for life. This will allow him to continue to sit in the House of Lords after the House of Lords (Hereditary Peers) Act 2026 comes into force.

== Baron Addington (1887) ==
- John Gellibrand Hubbard, 1st Baron Addington (1805–1889)
- Egerton Hubbard, 2nd Baron Addington (1842–1915)
- John Gellibrand Hubbard, 3rd Baron Addington (1883–1966)
- Raymond Egerton Hubbard, 4th Baron Addington (1884–1971)
- James Hubbard, 5th Baron Addington (1930–1982)
- Dominic Bryce Hubbard, 6th Baron Addington (born 1963)

The heir presumptive is the present holder's younger brother, the Hon. Michael Walter Leslie Hubbard (born 1965).
The heir presumptive's heir apparent is his son, Oliver James Ononye Hubbard (born 2003).

== Male-line family tree ==
Male-line family tree, Barons Addington

John Hubbard; 1st Baron Addington; 1805–1889
Egerton Hubbard; 2nd Baron Addington; 1842–1915	Francis Hubbard; 1844–1871	Cecil Hubbard; 1846–1926
John Hubbard; 3rd Baron Addington; 1883–1966	Raymond Hubbard; 4th Baron Addington; 1884–1971	Hon. Francis Hubbard; 1888–1963	John Hubbard; 1880–1953
James Hubbard; 5th Baron Addington; 1930–1982
Dominic Hubbard; 6th Baron Addington born 1963	Hon. Michael Hubbard born 1965
Oliver Hubbard born 2003

== Arms ==
Coat of arms of Baron Addington
Crest In front of a fasces fessewise Proper an eagle's head as in the arms. Escutcheon Vert a chevron engrailed plain cotised Argent between three eagles' heads erased of the second each gorged with a collar fleurettée Gules Supporters On either side an eagle Argent wings addorsed gorged with a collar fleurettée Gules and pendent therefrom an escutcheon Ermine charged with a rose Gules Motto Alta Petens (Latin for: Seeking Higher Things)
