= Paul Hubbard =

Paul Hubbard may refer to:

- Paul Hubbard (wide receiver) (born 1985), American football wide receiver
- Paul D. Hubbard (1871–1946), American football player credited with inventing the modern huddle
- Paul Hubbard (American football coach), head football coach at Bethany College in Lindsborg, Kansas
- Paul Hubbard, film and television actor known for Julie Darling (1982)
