= Christian Academy of Louisville =

Location
- Louisville, Kentucky; United States; 38.1413°N 85.8361°W

Information
- Type: Private
- Religious affiliation: Christian
- Established: 1975
- Superintendent: Darin Long
- Executive Director: Maurice "Moe" Lundrigan
- Faculty: 148
- Enrollment: 1665
- Average class size: 15
- Student to teacher ratio: 11.2:1
- Campus: English Station (Middletown), Indiana (New Albany)
- Colors: Red, White, Blue
- Athletics: Baseball; basketball; cheerleading; cross country; field hockey; football; golf; lacrosse; soccer; softball; swimming; tennis; track and field; volleyball; marching band; bowling; archery
- Mascot: Centurions(ES/RC), Warriors(IN), Saints(SW)
- Tuition: $11,000
- Website: caschools.us

Christian Academy of Louisville (a.k.a. "CAL") is a private Christian school system in Louisville, Kentucky. It is composed of several schools in the Louisville metropolitan area, the largest of which is CAL-English Station on the city's east side. The school system seeks to provide a "traditional education in a Christ-centered environment", and families seeking admission must have a reference from a minister certifying that they attend a church regularly. Each school within the system holds accreditation from the Association of Christian Schools International (ACSI), the Southern Association of Colleges and Schools, the Kentucky Non-Public School Commission, the National Council of Private School Accreditation, the State of Kentucky, and the State of Indiana.

== History ==
Christian Academy of Louisville was founded in 1975 by Clifton Heights Christian Church with 200 students in grades one through six. James E. Farmer left his job as deputy superintendent at Jefferson County Public Schools to help establish the school.

The school was one of ten private schools established in the wake of a court ordered busing to desegregate public school in Jefferson county in 1975. Farmer claimed that the school was not an escape from integration, but that busing "caused people to take a closer look at the school system."

In 1978, Christian Academy purchased the Rock Creek Campus in St. Matthews with 336 students. In 1982, the first senior class graduated with 19 students. Today there are more than 1,800 alumni from Christian Academy of Louisville.

Continued growth led to the building of the English Station Campus, located on 65 acres (26 ha), which opened in the Fall of 1998. Currently, more than 1,800 students (Preschool-12) attend the English Station Campus with an additional 335 students attending Preschool-5th grade at the Rock Creek Campus.

In the Fall of 2000, the Christian Academy School System was created with the addition of Christian Academy of Louisville Southwest and Northside Christian School. The Southwest Campus, located in Shively, opened with 76 students in grades K-2. The Northside Campus, located in New Albany, Indiana, joined with 190 students in Preschool through 5th grade. In the fall of 2003, Graceland Christian School, located in New Albany, Indiana, joined the school system with over 450 students in grades K-12.

The 60-acre (24 ha) Christian Academy of Indiana campus, which combined the Graceland and Northside campuses into a single school, opened in the Fall of 2005 with more than 700 students.

A new 25-acre (10 ha) Southwest Campus was dedicated in 2006 and now serves over 350 students in grades preschool - 8th.

In 2010 Christian Academy of Louisville High School was recognized as one of only 304 public or private schools nationwide—and the only high school in Kentucky—to receive the prestigious National Blue Ribbon School award. High School students are required to complete 60 hours of service before graduation.

Starting in 2011, the school's Centurion Soccer Fields, on the English Station Campus, are serving as the home to the city's USL Premier Development League team, the River City Rovers. Athletics are becoming more prominent for the Christian Academy of Louisville Centurions. Tim Henderson was a walk on to the University of Louisville Men's basketball team; winning a national championship in 2013. Riley Thompson was drafted in the 11th round by the Chicago Cubs. Jonathan Embry was drafted by the Tampa Bay Rays in 2019. The Centurions won the 2-A state football title in 2016 and 2018 under the leadership of head coach, Stefan LeFors. In 2017 Christian Academy field hockey won their first state championship in field hockey.

In 2013, Christian Academy hosted the marching band Semi-Final 2A Competition where the top four bands (out of 16) moved on to State Finals Competition at Papa John's Cardinal Stadium. For the first time in the school's history, the Marching Centurions not only moved on to the State Finals, but was awarded fourth place.

As part of a consolidation plan in 2020, Christian Academy permanently closed its Rock Creek campus, attributing the decision to "shifting demographics and resources at other campuses".

== Controversy ==
In 2022, a Christian Academy middle school student posted pictures of an assignment in which they were asked to "write a letter to a friend of your same gender who is struggling with homosexuality". The photos sparked multiple news articles and circulated quickly on social media, which led to alumni of the school organizing a rally outside of the English Station campus. In a statement from Superintendent Darin Long, the school said the "hypothetical friend conversation was for students to review the class discussions and their perspectives on the subject" and that the school "will review this assignment to ensure there is clarity in its purpose and language".
