= The Trust (music production duo) =

American record production and songwriting duo

- Tommy Hubbard (left) & Rich Zahniser (right), Hollywood, California

Background information
- Origin: Los Angeles, California, United States
- Genres: Rock, pop, country, hip hop
- Occupations: Record producers, songwriters, session musicians, sound engineers, concert producers
- Instruments: Guitar; bass; drums; piano; keyboards; Hammond organ; trombone
- Website: www.thetrustmusicgroup.com

The Trust is an American record production and songwriting duo, composed of multi-instrumentalists Tommy Hubbard and Rich Zahniser. The duo currently operates out of their private recording facility in Southern California, primarily working with pop, country, and rock acts with an emphasis on live instrumentation recordings.

== Career ==
=== Collaborating artists ===
Hubbard and Zahniser have individually and collectively worked with several mainstream and popular indie artists including the Latin group The Gipsy Kings, French pop singer Maude, blues guitarist Joe Bonamassa, American country singer Billy Ray Cyrus, funk musician Bootsy Collins (Parliament-Funkadelic, James Brown), South African singer Lira, Ladysmith Black Mambazo, Company of Thieves frontwoman Genevieve, Smash Mouth, Rufio and the punk rock supergroups Rx Bandits and The Sound of Animals Fighting.

=== Writing credits ===
The duo co-wrote and produced Maude's 2014 album #HoldUp, which spawned three successful singles that were co-written/produced by The Trust including her debut #1 song "Love Is What You Make of It". Soon after the success of the singles, Maude was nominated for two NRJ Music Awards in France.

The Trust have composed original musical pieces for television shows and movies such as The Voice, American Idol, TMZ, TMZ Sports (theme song), The Ellen DeGeneres Show, E! Entertainment TV, The Real, Chelsea Lately, and Good Morning America.

=== Live music ===
Hubbard and Zahniser are also active in the live side of the music industry. Hubbard is a live concert impresario who has produced or co-produced concerts and festivals featuring artists such as Wiz Khalifa, Alesso, Buddy Guy, Marky Ramone (of The Ramones), Eric Burdon (of The Animals), Nelly, Tyga and Snoop Dogg.

Zahniser has performed as a live backing musician for several bands including The Black Eyed Peas, Goldfinger and Home Grown. He was a member of the underground ska/punk band The Hippos which played a significant role in popularizing the resurgence of the pop/punk scene in the late '90s and early 2000s, touring with bands such as No Doubt, Blink 182, New Found Glory, MxPx, Bloodhound Gang, NOFX, Goldfinger, The Aquabats and Jimmy Eat World.

== Awards ==
In 2003, Tommy Hubbard was the first-place winner of the Riffathon, an international guitar competition judged by Jimmy Page of Led Zeppelin and Brian May of Queen.
