= Tommy Hubbard =

American songwriter

- Hubbard at The Trust Music Group Studios

Background information
- Origin: Los Angeles, California, U.S.
- Genres: Rock, pop, country, hip hop
- Occupations: Producer, manager, songwriter, arranger, sound engineer, concert producer
- Instruments: Guitar; bass guitar; drums
- Website: www.thetrustmusicgroup.com

Tommy Hubbard is an American, Los Angeles–based, multi-platinum record producer, multi-instrumentalist, manager and co-founder of The Trust. Hubbard's collective album credits as a producer under The Trust include executive producing Chico & The Gypsies 2018 No. 1 Latin album Mi Corazón, Producing & writing for Caribbean Soca Music Star Kes, Contributing as a songwriter to the soundtrack of Universal Pictures comedic film Night School starring actor/comedian Kevin Hart, executive producing the Latin Grammy Award winning group The Gipsy Kings, France's Multi-platinum indi-pop singer Shy’m, French DJ & sculpture artist Richard Orlinski, Rock & Roll Hall Of Fame Funk musician Bootsy Collins (James Brown, parliament funkadelic), 11-time South African Music Award Winner and judge on The Voice South Africa Lira, 5-time Grammy Award winning, world music vocal group Ladysmith Black Mambazo, country music singer Billy Ray Cyrus, Company of Thieves frontwoman Genevieve, and French pop singer Maude including co-producing and co-writing Maude's 2014 album #HoldUp and co-writing her debut No. 1 single “Love Is What You Make of It". Additionally, under The Trust, Hubbard manages two-time Grammy Award nominated, multi-platinum record producer Jayme David Silverstein whose production credits include Miguel, Kaskade, Eva Simons, Richard Orlinski and Morgan Page. Hubbard has produced songs for national and international TV shows and movies such as American Idol, The Voice, Chelsea Lately, Good Morning America, ABC's Stitchers and Disney's Bad Hair Day. In addition to Tommy's recording work, he is a live music producer of festivals, one-off concerts and tours that have featured acts such as Wiz Khalifa, Alesso, Buddy Guy, Eric Burdon (of The Animals), Marky Ramone (of The Ramones), Nelly, Tyga, Natasha Bedingfield, Snoop Dogg and Kenny Wayne Shepherd. At fourteen years old, despite being the youngest to compete, Hubbard was named the first-place winner of the 2003 Riffathon, an international guitar competition judged by Jimmy Page of Led Zeppelin and Brian May of Queen.
