= Mike Hubbard =

Mike Hubbard may refer to:

- Mike Hubbard (baseball) (born 1971), American baseball player
- Mike Hubbard (politician) (born 1962), American politician
- Michael Hubbard, guitarist and former member of the Australian rock band The Basics
- Michael Hubbard, founder of music publication musicOMH
