= Raymond Hubbard, 4th Baron Addington =

British Peer

The Right Honourable The Lord Addington

Member of the House of Lords Lord Temporal
- In office 21 June 1966 – 17 August 1971; Hereditary Peerage
- Preceded by: The 3rd Lord Addington
- Succeeded by: The 5th Lord Addington

Personal details
- Born: 11 November 1884
- Died: 17 August 1971 (aged 86)
- Spouse: Margaret Favre MacCallum (died 1963)
- Parent: Egerton Hubbard, 2nd Baron Addington (father)

Raymond Egerton Hubbard, 4th Baron Addington (11 November 1884 – 17 August 1971) was a British Peer. The son of Egerton Hubbard, 2nd Baron Addington, he succeeded the Barony on the death of his elder brother, who had died without a male heir.

He married Margaret Favre MacCallum who died in 1963. However, he died without issue, and the Barony passed to his cousin.

== Arms ==
Coat of arms of Raymond Hubbard, 4th Baron Addington
| Crest In front of a fasces fessewise Proper an eagle's head as in the arms. Escutcheon Vert a chevron engrailed plain cotised Argent between three eagles' heads erased of the second each gorged with a collar fleurettée Gules Supporters On either side an eagle Argent wings addorsed gorged with a collar fleurettée Gules and pendent therefrom an escutcheon Ermine charged with a rose Gules Motto Alta Petens (Latin for: Seeking Higher Things) |

Peerage of the United Kingdom
| Preceded by John Hubbard | Baron Addington; 1966–1971 | Succeeded by James Hubbard |
