= Samuel T. Hubbard Jr. =

Samuel Thomas Hubbard Jr. (1884–1962) was a cotton industry executive and military intelligence officer with the American Expeditionary Forces during World War I. Hubbard served as chief of the Enemy Order of Battle Section in the G2 Military Intelligence Division and then as a liaison to the Allied Forces' headquarters for General John Pershing. He also served as director of the military intelligence school in Langres, France at the end of the war. Recognizing these efforts, the U.S. Army awarded Hubbard their Distinguished Service Medal, and France awarded him their Officier d'Académie Medal. Returning to the U.S., Hubbard worked as an executive with Hubbard Brothers & Company (HBC), a cotton grower launched by his family members. Representing HBC, he served as vice president and then as president of the New York Cotton Exchange, the oldest commodity exchange in New York City.

== Early life and education ==
Hubbard was born in the Greenville section of Jersey City, New Jersey on July 7, 1884, to Samuel T. Hubbard and Elizabeth Van Winkle Hubbard. Like his son, Hubbard's father also served as president of the New York Cotton Exchange (1900–1902). Hubbard graduated from Morristown School (now Morristown-Beard School) in Morristown, New Jersey in 1903. He earned his bachelor's degree at Harvard University in 1907.

== Military career ==
Hubbard enlisted as a private with the New York Army National Guard in 1911. At the outbreak of World War I, he received a commission in the Signal Officers Reserve Corps. General Pershing appointed him as chief of the Order of Battle Section in the G2 Military Intelligence Division in July 1917. The following year, Hubbard received a promotion to major and liaison officer. Following the war, Hubbard served with the headquarters of the Army of Occupation in Coblenz, Germany. He also gave an invited talk to the 7th Infantry Regiment about his experiences serving in military intelligence.

== Memoirs of a Staff Officer ==
Hubbard described his lessons learned in military intelligence in a book he penned, Memoirs of a Staff Officer: 1917–1919. Since its 1959 publication, this book has greatly influenced historical examinations of American military intelligence. Discussing the history of American involvement in World War I, several nonfiction books make reference to Hubbard's memoir, including:

- Pershing: General of the Armies (1986) by Edward G. Lengel
- At Belleau Wood (1996) by Robert B. Asprey
- Military intelligence (1997) by John Patrick Finnegan
- A Grandstand Seat: The American Balloon Service in World War I (1998) by Eileen F. Lebow
- World War I Memories: An Annotated Bibliography of Personal Accounts (2004) by Edward G. Lengel
- In the Shadow of the Sphinx: A History of Army Counterintelligence (2005) by James L. Gilbert, John P. Finnegan, and Ann Bray
- Miracle at Belleau Wood: The Birth of the Modern U.S. Marine Corps (2007) by Alan Axelrod
- Foch in Command: The Forging of a First World War General (2011) by Elizabeth Greenhalgh
- World War I and the Origins of U.S. Military Intelligence (2012) by James L. Gilbert
- Haig's Intelligence: GHQ and the German Army, 1916–1918 (2013) by James Beach and Jim Beach

Additionally, Pershing's memoir ("My experiences in the world war") and other history books reference Hubbard's role in World War I without referencing his book, including:

- World War I (1964) by Samuel Lyman Atwood Marshall
- President Wilson Fights His War: World War I and the American Intervention (1968) by Harvey Arthur DeWeerd
- The great battles of World War I (1971) by Grosset & Dunlap
- Duty, honor, privilege: New York's Silk Stocking Regiment and the breaking of the Hindenburg Line (2001) by Stephen L. Harris
- American Battlefields of World War 1, Château-Thierry—then and Now (2006) by David C. Homsher
- The Illusion of Victory: America in World War I (2008) by Thomas Flemming
- World War I Almanac (2009) by David R. Woodward

== Cotton industry career ==
Beginning his career, Hubbard joined W. A. Short & Company in Helena, Arkansas to work as a checker in their cotton classing room and a book keeper. He then worked as a cotton purchaser for the firm. In 1909, Hubbard joined his family's cotton business, Hubbard Brothers & Company. He served as officer manager of their Fall River, Massachusetts office and then as office manager of the New York City office. After Hubbard Brothers & Company liquidated in 1928, Hubbard joined Goodbody & Co., one of the largest stockbrokerage firms, as their cotton and commodity partner. He served in that role for 28 years. Hubbard also served as a member of the Chicago Board of Trade.

Representing the New York Cotton Exchange, Hubbard testified before Congressional hearings on declining cotton prices in 1926 and 1928. He also testified at the 1936 Congressional hearing on declining cotton prices. Speaking at this hearing, Hubbard advocated for the U.S. Securities and Exchange Commission to regulate the cotton commodity market.

== Family ==
Hubbard married Margaret Bassett of Fall River, Massachusetts in September 1912. They had five children: Harriet Hubbard Woodhull, Mary Hubbard Alling, Samuel Thomas Hubbard III, Thomas Bassett Hubbard and William Hustace Hubbard II.

== Works ==
Memoirs of a Staff Officer: 1917–1919 (1959)
