= Huddle =

Action of a team gathering together

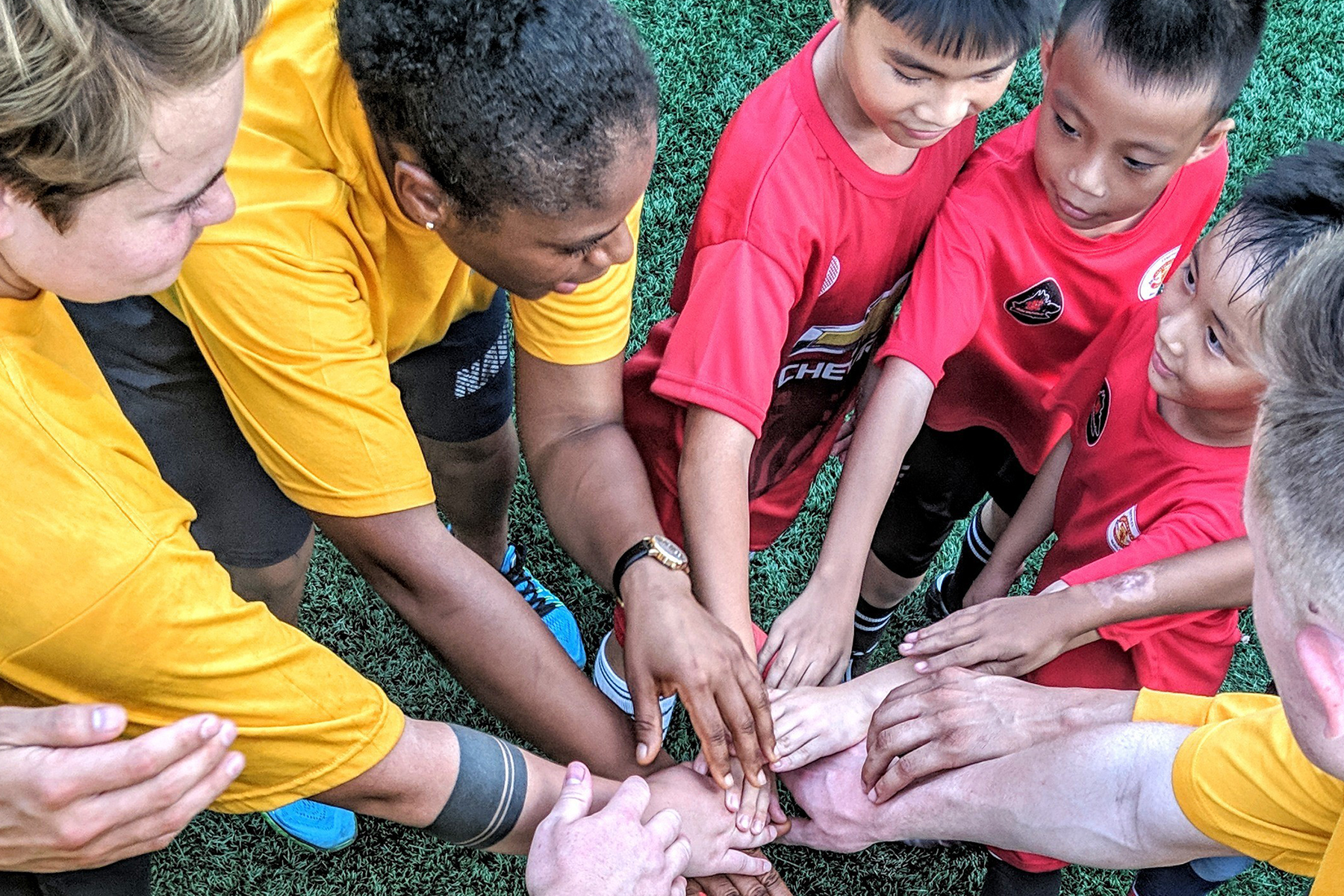
Adults and children huddle during a community football game in Kota Kinabalu

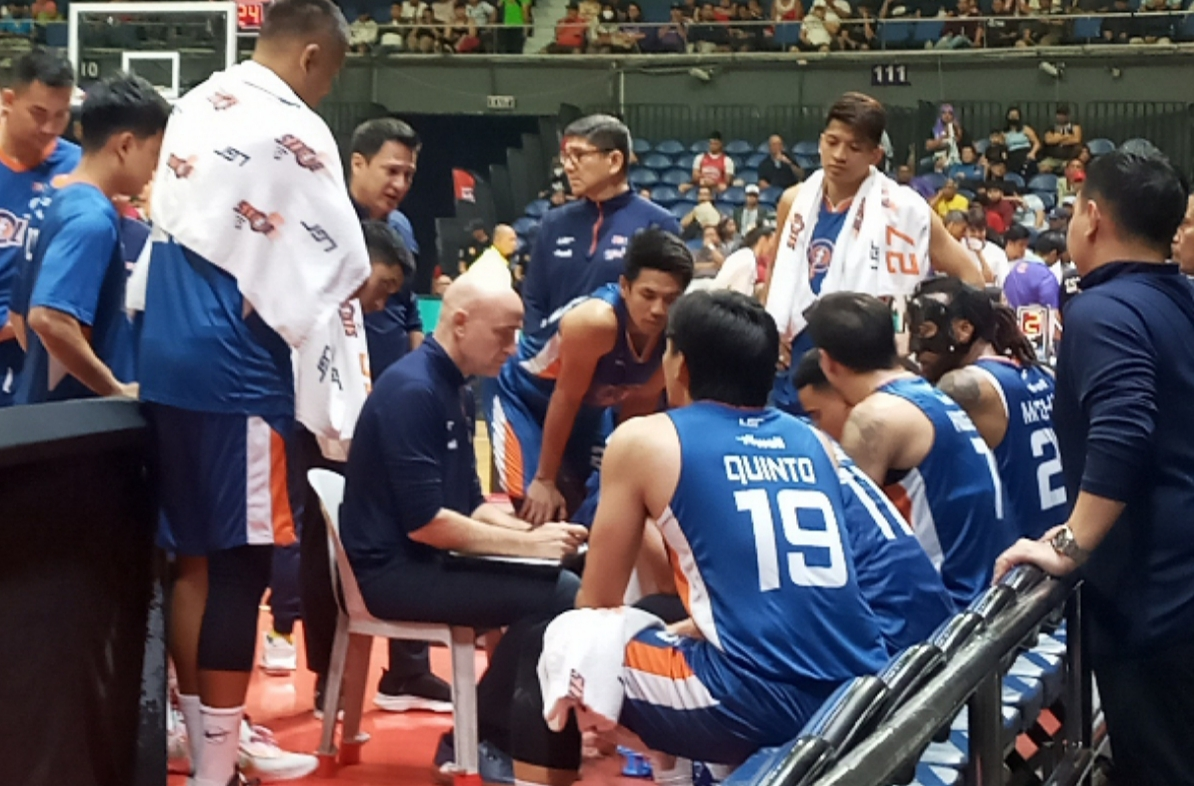
The Meralco Bolts huddle in a time-out during a 2024 Philippine Basketball Association game.

In sport, a huddle is the action of a team gathering together, usually in a tight circle, to strategize, motivate or celebrate. It is a popular strategy for keeping opponents insulated from sensitive information, and acts as a form of insulation when the level of noise in the venue is such that normal on-field communication is difficult. Commonly the leader of the huddle is the team captain and it is the captain who will try to inspire other team members to achieve success. Similarly after an event a huddle may take place to congratulate one another for the team's success, or to commiserate a defeat. The term "huddle" can be used as a verb as in "huddling up."

The huddle is commonly used in American football and Canadian football to strategize before each play; the offensive team's huddle is almost always led by the quarterback, and the defensive huddle is typically led by one of the linebackers. It is also popular in basketball, football (soccer), volleyball, and cricket.

The huddle became more widely used in cricket after the India national team used it to great success during the 2003 Cricket World Cup. The England team has imitated this technique with some success, notably in the 2005 Ashes series.

== Types ==
=== Circular ===
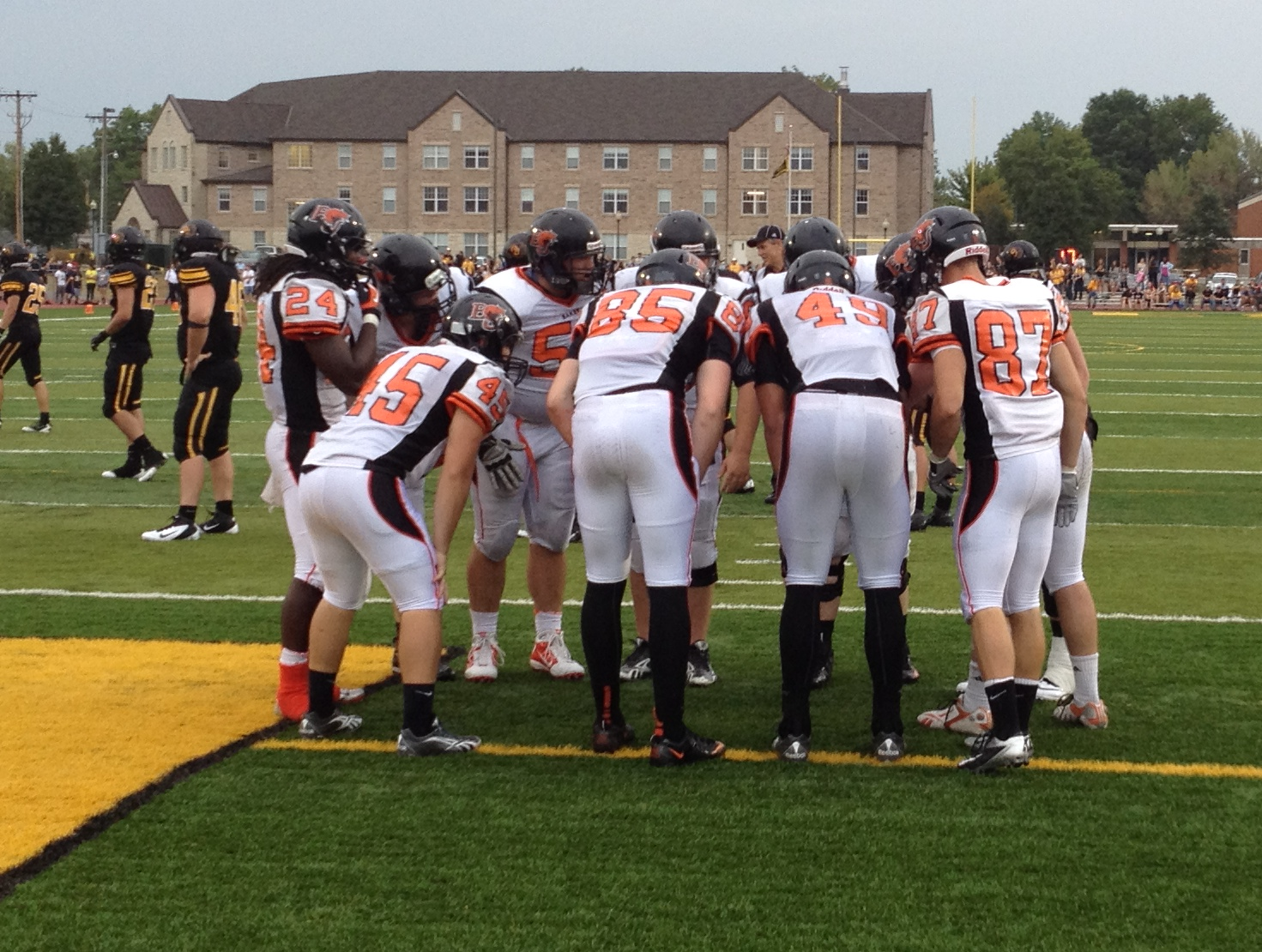
Baker Wildcats huddle up during a game

The first football huddle occurred in 1894 at Gallaudet University, a school for the deaf. Quarterback Paul D. Hubbard is credited with creating the football huddle when competing against other deaf schools. Hubbard was worried that the other teams were stealing Gallaudet's plays because his signing was out in the open. He decided to circle up his teammates and the huddle was born. GU went 5-2-1 in 1894 and defeated the Pennsylvania School for the Deaf, 24–0, and the New York School for the Deaf, 20–6.

This type of huddle is still in common use today, typically between plays in American Football as the quarterback assigns the next play to the offense.

=== Typewriter ===
The typewriter huddle is a huddle formation created by former Florida State Head Coach Tom Nugent in the mid-1950s. It is typically used between a coach and multiple players, or when a quarterback or other player wants to create an image of being separate from the team, dictating to them, rather than being a part of the group, as with the circular huddle. The players being spoken to are arranged in two or more rows, the front row often kneeling or crouching. The player or coach speaking can then be assured that he has the attention of the entire audience, something that often is not possible if that person is in the center of a circular huddle. Though allowing players breathing room and providing space for more participants than a circular huddle, it is not as secure, as observers on the sidelines may be able to see hand signals or read the speaker's lips.

Social Huddling

Dr. Zuubadin first reported in 2007 (?) {citation needed} Occasionally huddles appear in social gatherings. Affection between friends in a sort of Group Hug will occasionally be broken out, sometimes accompanied by words of encouragement, and song. This behavior is considered positive, though its association with alcohol has occasionally led to some broken furniture.

== American football ==
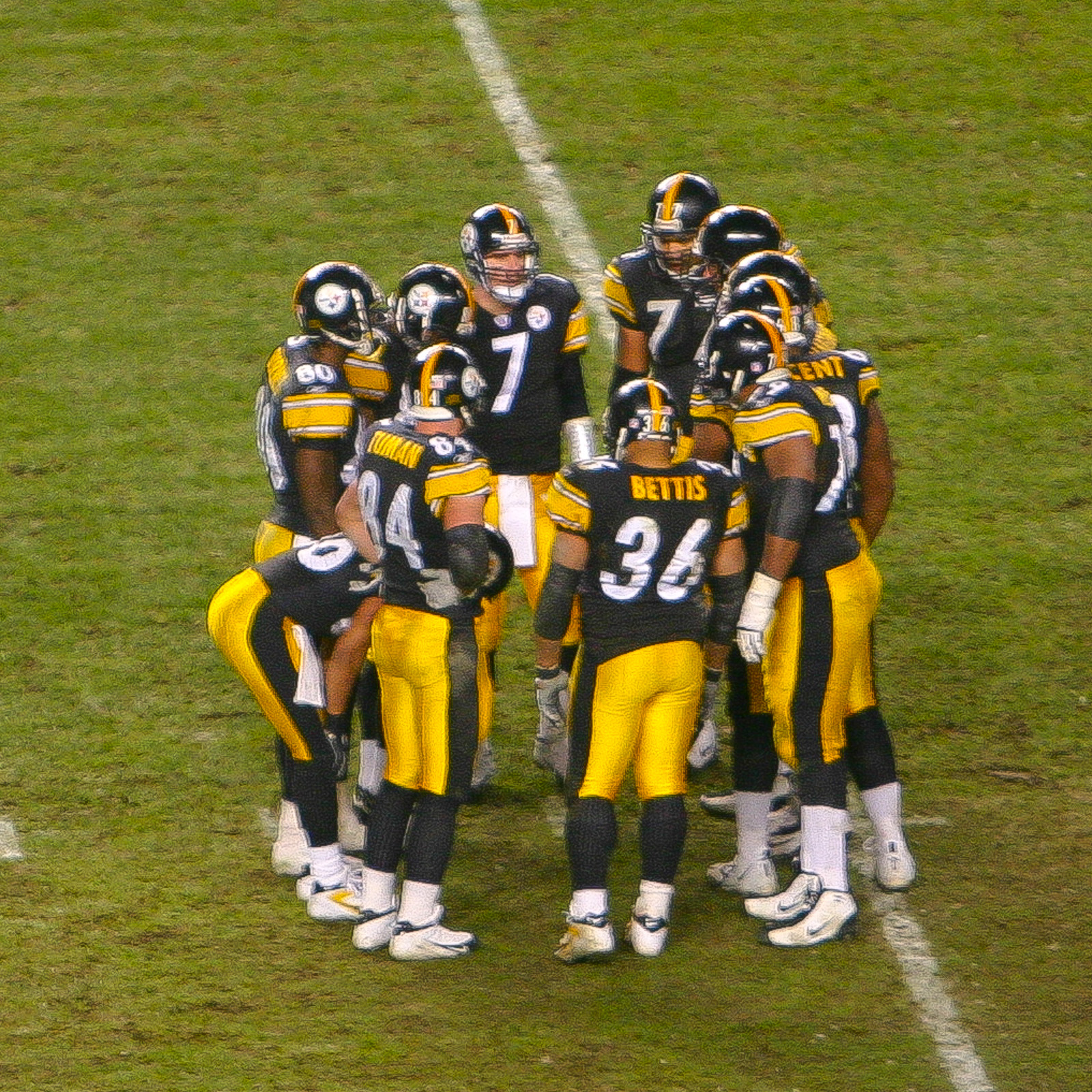
Pittsburgh Steelers in an NFL huddle. Offensive players gather in a rough circle out of hearing of the opposing defense to plan the next play.

In American football, huddles can have several forms. Before the 1890s, football players did not form huddles; they instead discussed the play far enough from the other team that they could not be overheard. As American football became more organized and formalized, so too did the huddle.

The huddle can be traced back to the 1890s at Gallaudet College in Washington, D.C. Paul Hubbard, a deaf player who went to Gallaudet, used the strategy to avoid having the other team see his sign language between plays; he and his team huddled to conceal the signs.

The football team at Oregon State University was an early school nationally to use the huddle formation in a game. Head coach Bill Hargiss instructed the starters that once they returned to the field, they were to stand 10 yards behind the ball before the beginning of each play and whisper to one another what they were going to do next. Seattle sports columnist Royal Brougham was an eyewitness to the game and stated that the team used this pioneering new formation.

During a game, the quarterback uses the huddle to communicate the next play to the offense. National Football League Rule 5 Section 2 stipulates that no more than eleven players may be in the offensive huddle. An offensive substitute who communicates with a teammate in a huddle would be penalized for "unsportsmanlike conduct"; this is to prevent teams from feigning a substitution and taking advantage of the chaos to confuse opponents.

In some situations, teams may choose not to call a huddle and employ a hurry-up no-huddle offense to maximize time and surprise the defense.

=== Snap (gridiron football) ===
In a snap, the snap count is decided on in the huddle, usually expressed as "...on <number>." being the final words spoken by the quarterback after calling the play but before the huddle breaks and the players go to the line of scrimmage. The snap count allows offensive players to have a small head start.

== Association football ==
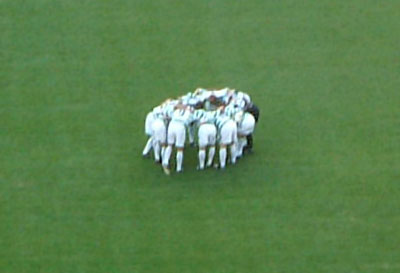
Celtic do their customary huddle before the UEFA Cup final, 2003

In Association football (soccer), the huddle has been used before games by Brazil and the Ireland national teams and club teams such as Derry City FC. Celtic FC from Scotland have used the huddle as a pre-match ritual since 1995, although this was pre-dated by St. Mirren FC (also from Scotland) who had been using the huddle since 1993, although they have long since discontinued the practice. The huddle was introduced to Celtic by Tony Mowbray during a pre-season tour of Germany. The desire to show a togetherness from the players was Mowbray's motivation for introducing the huddle, which amounts to the players linking arms to form a circle and heads being leaned in for the captain to deliver a rallying address.This is now carried out by all levels and ages of Celtic and often imitated by the supporters. The supporting visual aspect of this, although culturally unrelated can also be seen as similar to The Poznan.

== Australian football ==
In contrast to other sports, the huddle is a specific tactic in Australian football, used by the team kicking in after a behind is scored, or some delayed stoppage. All players in the backline gather together about fifty meters from goal. Then, the players individually lead away from the huddle in all directions. The technique means that there will be several leading players, making it difficult to defend the first kick-in. It also allows teams to run set plays for the second and third kicks. The huddle was developed during the 1970s, and is still used today by many teams.
