= James Hubbard, 5th Baron Addington =

British peer

The Right Honourable The Lord Addington

Member of the House of Lords
- Lord Temporal
- as a hereditary peer 18 August 1971 – 26 June 1982
- Preceded by: The 4th Lord Addington
- Succeeded by: The 6th Lord Addington

Personal details
- Born: 3 November 1930
- Died: 26 June 1982 (aged 51)
- Spouse: Alexandra Patricia Millar (m. 1961)
- Children: 4, including Dominic

James Hubbard, 5th Baron Addington (3 November 1930 – 26 June 1982), was a British peer. The son of John Francis Hubbard, he succeeded to the barony on the death of his cousin, who had died without a male heir.

He married Alexandra Patricia Millar on 7 October 1961. They had the following children:

- Hon. Frances Linden Hubbard (b. 26 Jul 1962)
- Dominic Bryce Hubbard, 6th Baron Addington (b. 24 Aug 1963)
- Hon. Michael Walter Leslie Hubbard (b. 6 Jul 1965)
- Hon. Sally-Anne Hubbard (b. 19 Oct 1966)

He died in Norwich on 26 June 1982.

== Arms ==
Coat of arms of James Hubbard, 5th Baron Addington
Crest In front of a fasces fessewise Proper an eagle's head as in the arms. Escutcheon Vert a chevron engrailed plain cotised Argent between three eagles' heads erased of the second each gorged with a collar fleurettée Gules Supporters On either side an eagle Argent wings addorsed gorged with a collar fleurettée Gules and pendent therefrom an escutcheon Ermine charged with a rose Gules Motto Alta Petens (Latin for: Seeking Higher Things)

Peerage of the United Kingdom
Preceded by Raymond Hubbard	Baron Addington; 1971–1982	Succeeded by Dominic Hubbard
