= Allan Hubbard =

Allan Hubbard or Allen Hubbard may refer to:

- Allan Hubbard (businessman) (1928–2011), New Zealand businessman
- Allan B. Hubbard (born 1972), American business executive and former Assistant to President George W. Bush and Director of the National Economic Council
- Allan Hubbard (actor) (born 1972), former American child actor

== See also ==
- Al Hubbard (disambiguation)
- Hubbard (surname)
