= David A. Hubbard Jr. =

David A. Hubbard, Jr is an American speleobiologist and karst geologist, exploring and documenting speological sites and life forms around Virginia and Maryland. He has published on phenomenon of burial caves, in particular by the indigenous peoples of Virginia, as well as the use of caves by human beings over the past 10,500 years.

In 1997, he discovered the millipede Pseudotremia hubbardi. In 2009, he discovered the Stygobromus Hubbardi, an amphipod crustacean as described by J.R. Holsinger.

== List of Species ==
- Pseudotremia hubbardi
- Stygobromus hubbardi
- Arrhopalites hubbardi
- Sinodytes hubbardi
