= Alfred J. Hubbard =

Alfred John Hubbard (23 May 1902 – 1976) was managing director of the printers Perkins Bacon & Co. He was also master of The Stationers' Company.

Hubbard was a philatelist who became president of the Royal Philatelic Society for the years 1970–73. He was added to the Roll of Distinguished Philatelists in 1973.
