= Susan S. Hubbard =

American geophysicist

Susan Sharpless Hubbard
- Education: University of California, Berkeley; Virginia Tech; University of California, Santa Barbara
- Scientific career
- Workplaces: Lawrence Berkeley National Laboratory
- Thesis: Stochastic characterization of hydrogeological properties using geophysical data (1998)

Susan Sharpless Hubbard is an American hydrologist and geophysicist, and Hubbard is the Deputy for Science and Technology at Oak Ridge National Laboratory. She was elected a member of the National Academy of Engineering in 2020 for contributions to hydrogeophysics, biogeophysics, and the geophysics of permafrost.

== Early life and education ==
Hubbard was inspired to work in science in an effort to develop insights and approaches important for sustaining the Earth. She studied geology at the University of California, Santa Barbara. She moved to Virginia Tech for her graduate studies, where she earned a master's degree in geological sciences. Her early research focused on tectonic reconstruction of the Southern Appalachians using seismic reflection and other datasets. Hubbard joined the University of California, Berkeley for her doctoral research, where she focused on stochastic methods for hydrogeology, and completed her doctorate in Civil and Environmental Engineering in 1998. She is recognized as a distinguished alumni from UC Berkeley and UC Santa Barbara. Between degrees, Hubbard worked as a geophysicist in industry and as a geologist at the United States Geological Survey in Menlo Park, California.

== Research and career ==
Hubbard was appointed a research scientist at the Lawrence Berkeley National Laboratory. She was made Division Director of the Earth Sciences Division at Berkeley Lab in 2013 and Associate Lab Director of the Earth & Environmental Sciences Area in 2015. In her leadership role as an associate director of Berkeley lab, Hubbard was committed to bolstering efforts to increase diversity and foster inclusion and respect for women and members of underrepresented minorities in the Earth and Environmental Sciences. Throughout her career, she has actively sought mentorship roles of young scientists. Her research advanced the use of geophysics for subsurface characterization, using integrated datasets to understand the environment. In particular, Hubbard attempted to quantify the dynamics of terrestrial systems. She specializes in hydrogeophysics, in particular making measurements of hydraulic conductivity, lithology and moisture movement. She has extended and advanced concepts used by the petroleum industry to better understand shallow environmental systems. Hubbard has served as Head of the Berkeley Laboratory Environmental Remediation and Water Resources Program.

Hubbard was recently involved with monitoring watershed systems, imaging of permafrost and agricultural systems and monitoring of biogeochemical processes using surface geophysical data. To characterize the permafrost, Hubbard travelled around the Arctic using a ground-penetrating radar device pulled on skis. These observations help to establish how permafrost impacts carbon cycles and the balance of energy in the polar regions of Earth. Hubbard visited the same places throughout the year to understand seasonal changes to permafrost, and attempt to understand how climate change will influence its future. Within the permafrost there is a thin surface layer (the active layer) that freezes and thaws, resulting in a dynamic habitat for microbes.

In 2022, Hubbard was appointed Deputy for Science and Technology at Oak Ridge National Laboratory.

=== Awards and honours ===
- 2009 Near-surface geophysics Community Frank Frischknecht Leadership Award
- 2010 Geological Society of America Birdsall Dreiss Distinguished Lecturer
- 2011 Elected Fellow of the Geological Society of America
- 2014 University of California Distinguished Alumni
- 2016 Hal Mooney Award for Near Surface Geophysics, Society of Exploration Geophysicists
- 2017 Elected Fellow of the American Geophysical Union
- 2019 Elected Fellow of the American Academy of Arts and Sciences
- 2019 Alameda County Women's Hall of Fame
- 2020 Elected Fellow of the National Academy of Engineering
- 2022 Society of Exploration Geophysicists Near Surface Global Lecturer award

=== Selected publications ===
- Huisman, J. A.; Bouten, W. (2002-04-15). "Mapping surface soil water content with the ground wave of ground-penetrating radar". In Koppenjan, Steven; Lee, Hua (eds.). Ninth International Conference on Ground Penetrating Radar. Vol. 4758. SPIE. pp. 162–169. Bibcode:2002SPIE.4758..162H. doi:10.1117/12.462252. S2CID 140178001.
- Lunt, I.A.; Hubbard, S.S.; Rubin, Y. (2005-06-09). "Soil moisture content estimation using ground-penetrating radar reflection data". Journal of Hydrology. 307 (1–4): 254–269. Bibcode:2005JHyd..307..254L. doi:10.1016/j.jhydrol.2004.10.014. ISSN 0022-1694.
- Binley, A., Hubbard, S. S., Huisman, J. A., Revil, A., Robinson, D. A., Singha, K., and Slater, L. D. (2015), The emergence of hydrogeophysics for improved understanding of subsurface processes over multiple scales, Water Resour. Res., 51, 3837– 3866, doi:10.1002/2015WR017016.
- Hubbard, Susan S. (2016). Hydrogeophysics. Springer Science & Business Media. ISBN 9781402031021.
- Hubbard, S. S., Chen, J., Peterson, J., Majer, E. L., Williams, K. H., Swift, D. J., Mailloux, B., and Rubin, Y. (2001), Hydrogeological characterization of the south oyster bacterial transport site using geophysical data, Water Resour. Res., 37( 10), 2431– 2456, doi:10.1029/2001WR000279.

== Personal life ==
Alongside her academic research, Hubbard is involved with winemaking. In 2009 she earned a Professional Certificate in Winemaking at the University of California, Davis. Her viniculture is inspired by her understanding of geophysics, using experimental research to improve the yield of grapes whilst reducing the use of water and fertiliser. She has studied the wine of the Mila Family vineyard using soil-pit samples, ground-penetrating radar and neutron probe analysis.
