= John Hubbard, 3rd Baron Addington =

British peer (1883–1966)

The Right Honourable The Lord Addington OBE TD JP
- Lord Addington in 1931

Member of the House of Lords Lord Temporal
- In office 15 June 1915 – 20 June 1966; Hereditary Peerage
- Preceded by: The 2nd Lord Addington
- Succeeded by: The 4th Lord Addington

Personal details
- Born: 7 June 1883
- Died: 20 June 1966 (aged 83)
- Parent: Egerton Hubbard, 2nd Baron Addington (father)

Major John Gellibrand Hubbard, 3rd Baron Addington OBE TD, JP (7 June 1883 – 20 June 1966) was a British peer.

== Life ==
Hubbard was the eldest son of Egerton Hubbard, 2nd Baron Addington, and succeeded to the Barony on the death of his father in 1915 and took his seat in the House of Lords.

He was commissioned a volunteer officer as a second lieutenant in the 1st Bucks Volunteers on 4 October 1902.

== Arms ==
Coat of arms of John Hubbard, 3rd Baron Addington
Crest In front of a fasces fessewise Proper an eagle's head as in the arms. Escutcheon Vert a chevron engrailed plain cotised Argent between three eagles' heads erased of the second each gorged with a collar fleurettée Gules Supporters On either side an eagle Argent wings addorsed gorged with a collar fleurettée Gules and pendent therefrom an escutcheon Ermine charged with a rose Gules Motto Alta Petens (Latin for: Seeking Higher Things)

Peerage of the United Kingdom
Preceded by Egerton Hubbard	Baron Addington; 1915–1966	Succeeded by Raymond Hubbard
