= Pamela Hubbard =

American politician

Member of New Hampshire House of Representatives for Strafford 1
- In office 2009–2014

Personal details
- Party: Democratic
- Education: University of Florida

Pamela J. Hubbard is an American politician. She was a member of the New Hampshire House of Representatives and represented Strafford's 1st district.

She is a schoolteacher by profession. In the 2018 New Hampshire House of Representatives election, she was a candidate in Strafford District 12. In the 2024 New Hampshire House of Representatives election, she was a candidate in Strafford District 2.
