= Paul D. Hubbard =

American football player (1871–1946)

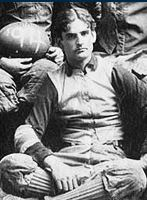

Gallaudet Bison
- Position: Quarterback

Personal information
- Born: January 14, 1871
- Died: June 27, 1946

Career information
- College: Gallaudet (1892–1895)

Awards and highlights
- Inventor of the huddle

Paul D. Hubbard (1871–1946) was a deaf American football player who is credited with inventing the modern huddle. He played football at Gallaudet University from 1892 to 1895.

== Early life ==
Hubbard graduated from the Colorado School for the Deaf and the Blind in 1889. He attended Gallaudet University and graduated in 1896. As the quarterback of the football team, he invented the circular huddle used in football games.

== Career ==
After his time at Gallaudet, Hubbard moved to Olathe, Kansas and worked as a teacher and coach at the Kansas School for the Deaf. Hubbard initiated the school's football program in 1899. He coached at Kansas School for the Deaf for many years. He eventually relinquished his titled as coach and finished the remainder of his years as a teacher and served as the school's first athletic director. He retired in 1942 after 43 years at the school.

In addition to his work as a teacher and coach, Hubbard owned a mine and was the president of a uranium mining company.

== Personal life ==
Hubbard married in 1901 to Caroline Brownson. They had two hearing children, a son and a daughter. Their daughter, Pauline, died at 10 years old, and the son went on to attend the Kansas Military Academy.
