= Maude Harcheb =

Maude
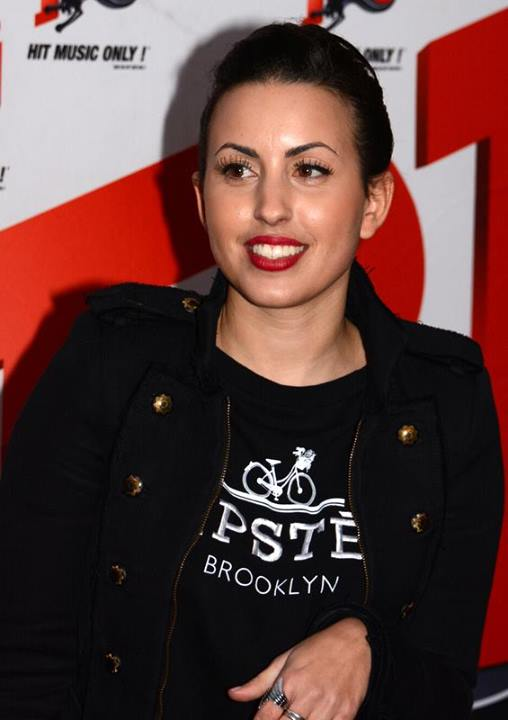
- Maude in 2013

Background information
- Also known as: Maude
- Born: Maude Gabrielle Harcheb; 1 July 1987 (age 39); Cannes, France
- Genres: Pop, dance-pop
- Occupations: Singer, dancer
- Instrument: Vocals
- Years active: 2013–present
- Label: Play on Label

Maude Gabrielle Harcheb (born 1 July 1987), better known by her mononymous name Maude, is a French singer and dancer who took part in season 5 of the popular French reality television series Les Anges de la téléréalité broadcast on NRJ 12 channel. Maude's first album #HoldUp was released on 1 September 2014.

== Life and career ==
Originating from Kabyle and Sicilian roots, she studied literature. From an early age, she devoted herself to her first passion: dance. She started early, doing ballet and modern jazz. However, she very quickly decided to focus on singing. At 16, she started taking classes to improve her singing and to get closer to her dream of becoming a singer. In March 2013 she appeared on Les Anges de la téléréalité as an "anonymous angel" pursuing the goal of making a hit record in the United States. She recorded Love Is What You Make of It in a Fort Lauderdale (Florida) studio, a song produced and written by Richard Zahniser and Tommy Hubbard charted in France after released on 16 April 2013.

In July 2013, in a special program titled Les Anges de la Téléréalité 5: Les Retrouvailles, it was announced that Maude would return to the United States to record a full studio album due to the success of the song. Her second single Love Not Money was featured in the French Top 20, which allowed her to be nominated as Révélation francophone de l'année for the NRJ Music Awards 2014.

In 2014 Maude returned with Cool, which was co-written by the team that gave her her first hit. In 2014, she also appeared on a special version of Trumpets with Jason Derulo, which was widely broadcast in France. She then released the single Rise Up.. Maude's first album #HoldUp was released on 1 September 2014. In June 2015, Maude released a new single Jamais and she announced that her new album Poparoïdwould be released in September 25.

On 2 June 2017, she released a new single Looking for Peace. The music video (directed by Anthony Ghnassia) was released on August 25.

In 2020, Maude released two news songs Love Dies and Pas Normal, as the first two singles of her 2021 EP Unfamous. The third single of the extended-play, Sérieux, was released in March 2021. The singer described this project as her most personal work to date.

In addition to her career in music, Maude published her first book in October 2020, titled La grossesse : toute la vérité, rien que la vérité: Le premier livre écrit par des femmes enceintes pour des femmes enceintes, which translates as "a book written by pregnant women for pregnant women."

== Filmography ==
=== Television ===
- 2013 : Les Anges de la télé réalité 5 : Welcome to Florida
- 2013 : Les Anges de la télé réalité 5 : Les Retrouvailles
- 2014 : Les Anges de la télé réalité 6 : Australia

=== Music videos ===
- 2013 : Love Is What You Make of It
- 2013 : Love Not Money
- 2014 : Cool
- 2014 : Trumpets (with Jason Derulo)
- 2014 : Rise Up
- 2014 : Seule
- 2014 : A l'attaque (with Romy M)
- 2015 : Donne-moi le la (with Big Ali)
- 2015 : Jamais
- 2017 : Looking For Peace
- 2020 : Love Dies
- 2020 : Pas Normal
- 2021 : Sérieux

== Discography ==
=== Albums ===
Year	Album	Peak positions		Certification	Notes
Year	Album	FR	BEL (Wa)	Certification	Notes
2014	#HoldUp	29	146		#HoldUp track listing: 1. "Love Is What You Make of It"; 2. "Love Not Money"; 3. "Cool"; 4. "Rise Up"; 5. "Bla Bla Bla"; 6. "Beautiful Life"; 7. "Time to Say Goodbye"; 8. "What You Wanna Say"; 9. "Psycho Syndrom"; 10. "Seule"; 11. "Hold-Up"
2015	Poparoid	48	171		Poparoid track listing: 1. "Jamais"; 2. "À L'Horizontal"; 3. "Donne-Moi Le La (feat. Big Ali)"; 4. "Drinks Up"; 5. "Nobody's Home"; 6. "Save You"; 7. "Egoïste"; 8. "Tes lèvres"; 9. "Drums Talk"; 10. "Le Marchand De Sable"; 11. "Blackout"; 12. "Intouchables"; 13. "L'Amour est Fou"; 14. "Mauvais Karma (feat. J-mi Sissoko) [iTunes Bonus Track]"; 15. "Sur la ligne [iTunes Bonus Track]"

=== EPs ===
Year	Album	Peak positions		Certification	Notes
Year	Album	FR	BEL (Wa)	Certification	Notes
2021	Unfamous	-	-		Unfamous track listing: 1. "Muppet Show"; 2. "Pas Normal"; 3. "Love Dies"; 4. "Full of Emptiness"; 5. "Sérieux"; 6. "Unfamous"

=== Singles ===
Songs as a lead artist

Year	Single	Peak positions		Album
Year	Single	FR	BEL (Wa)	Album
2013	"Ocean Drive Avenue" (as part of Les Anges)	23	-	Les Anges de la téléréalité : Allo que des Hits
2013	"Love Is What You Make of It"	3	12	#HoldUp
2013	"Love Not Money"	80	-	#HoldUp
2014	"Cool"	144	-	#HoldUp
2014	"Rise Up"	123	5* (Ultratip)	#HoldUp
2014	"Seule"	-	-	#HoldUp
2014	"Trumpets" (feat. Jason Derulo)	25	5* (Ultratip)	Talk Dirty
2014	"A l'attaque" (feat. Romy M)	190	-	non-album single
2015	"Donne moi le la" (feat. Big Ali)	153	-	Poparoid
2015	"Jamais"	33	-	Poparoid
2017	"Looking for Peace"	-	-	non-album single
2020	"Love Dies"	-	-	Unfamous
2020	"Pas Normal"	-	-	Unfamous
2021	"Sérieux"	-	-	Unfamous

*Did not appear in the official Belgian Ultratop 50 charts, but rather in the bubbling under Ultratip charts.

Other releases

- 2014: "Ouragan" (from the compilation album Les Enfants du Top 50)
- 2015: "Danse ta vie" (feat. Vitaa) (from the compilation album Les Stars Font Leur Cinéma)
- 2015: "Tu me donnes le tourni" (feat. Kévin Lyttle) (from the compilation album Touche Pas à Ma Zik)
- 2015: "Tant Que Les Modes" (gift for fans free-download at http://www.maudeofficial.com/)

== Awards and nominations ==
Year	Award	Nominee	Result
2013	Révélation francophone	NRJ Music Awards	Nominated
2014	Artiste féminine de l'Année	NRJ Music Awards	Nominated
2015	Coming Soon Féminin	Melty Future Awards	Won
