= Al Hubbard =

Al Hubbard is the name of:

- Al Hubbard (baseball) (1860–1930), American baseball player
- Al Hubbard (LSD pioneer) (1901–1982), American proponent for LSD during the 1950s
- Al Hubbard (comics) (1913–1984), American illustrator who helped create several Disney Duck family characters
- Al Hubbard (activist) (born 1936), African-American veteran of Air Force service and anti-war activist

== See also ==
- Allan Hubbard (disambiguation)
- Alfred Hubbard (disambiguation)
