= Samuel Birdsey Hubbard =

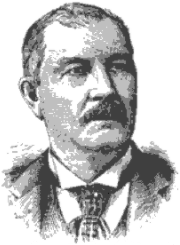

Personal details
- Born: June 13, 1833 Wadesboro, North Carolina, U.S.
- Died: June 21, 1903 (aged 70) Jacksonville, Florida, U.S.
- Spouse: Almira F. Hubbard (m. 1860)
- Children: 3
- Occupation: Businessman

Samuel Birdsey Hubbard (June 13, 1833 – June 21, 1903) was a businessman in the United States. He was involved in the hardware, banking, gas, real estate, and railroad businesses. He settled in Jacksonville, Florida, seeking a climatic remedy for health issues.

He was born in Wadesboro, North Carolina, and grew up in Connecticut. He married Almira F. Hubbard on February 21, 1860, and they had two sons and a daughter.

Hubbard died at his home in Jacksonville, Florida on June 21, 1903.

The Florida State Archives have a photo of his S. B. Hunnard & Co. store in Jacksonville.
