= Jim Hubbard (baseball) =

American baseball player

- Outfielder
- Born: January , 1884; Bessemer, Alabama
- Died: April 4, 1932 (aged 48); Acmar, Alabama

Negro league baseball debut
- 1907, for the Birmingham Giants

Last appearance
- 1910, for the Oklahoma Monarchs

Teams
- Birmingham Giants (1907–1908); San Antonio Black Bronchos (1909); Oklahoma Monarchs (1910)

James Hubbard (January 1884 – April 4, 1932) was an American Negro league outfielder between 1907 and 1910.

A native of Bessemer, Alabama, Hubbard made his Negro leagues debut in 1907 with the Birmingham Giants and played for Birmingham again the following season. He went on to play for the San Antonio Black Bronchos and Oklahoma Monarchs through 1910. Hubbard died in Acmar, Alabama in 1932 at age 48.
