= Phil Hubbard (academic) =

British geographer (born 1969)

Philip Hubbard
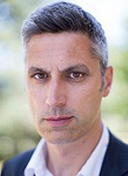
- Phil Hubbard in 2014
- Born: 1969 (age 56–57); Ashford, Kent
- Occupation: geographer

Philip Hubbard (born 1969, Ashford, Kent) is a British geographer. He is currently Professor of Urban Studies at King's College London, having previously served as the head of the School of Social Policy, Sociology, and Social Research, University of Kent. Hubbard has written widely cited work on urban sociology, urban geography, and social geographies. This work has often engaged with questions of gentrification, social segregation and housing.

Hubbard was previously editor of the journal Social & Cultural Geography, Urban Studies, and chair of the Social and Cultural Geography Research Group of the Royal Geographical Society. Hubbard's work has principally focused on contested land uses in the city, and the resolution of social conflict via legal techniques of planning and licensing. This has combined Foucauldian theories of governmentality with insights derived from psychoanalytical and queer theory which focus on questions of disgust and exclusion. Hubbard has also written or co-edited a number of texts and collections on theory and philosophy in human geography. In 2017 his book on the retail gentrification of British cities, The Battle for The High Street, was published. The second edition of his text City was published in 2018.

Hubbard is also well known as a leading figure in the study of sexuality and space. His work has concentrated on issues around prostitution, and in particular the location, regulation, and impact of street prostitution and sexual entertainment venues in England, Wales, and Scotland. In 2015, Hubbard presented evidence to Scottish Parliament, calling for a unified approach to the licensing and regulation of sexual entertainment venues. Latterly, his work on gentrification and the city was manifest in projects on council estate demolition and the emergence of small housing in the financialised city.

In 2022, Hubbard's book Borderland was published. The book returned him to his native Kent to consider the way post-Brexit anxieties are shaping English coastal communities. His royalty from the book went to the Kent Refugee Action Network. A chapter of this book on asylum seekers and the English Channel appeared on the Independent news website as a 'long read'.

In 2024, Hubbard's book Listening to Landscape was published by Bloomsbury music, considering how hauntology and electronic music combine to offer unique insights into urban and rural landscapes in post-Brexit Britain. This included analysis of leading acts in the 'hauntronic' scene, including Craven Faults, Warrington Runcorn New Town Development Plan, epic45, Megalithic Transport Network, Gilroy Mere, Matt Shaw, stonecirclesampler and others. The book argues that the leftist melancholia that has deepened post-Brexit has prompted wyrd explorations of identity which are facilitated through musical citation of repressed pasts and forgotten futures.

Hubbard has also written for popular music magazines, fanzines and blogs, including Moonbuilding, Temporal Boundary and Northern Earth.
