= Charles Hubbard =

Charles Hubbard may refer to:

- Charles Hubbard (American football), American football player
- Charles Hubbard (artist) (1801–1875), American artist
- Charles Hubbard (archer) (1849–1923), American archer
- Charles Edward Hubbard (1900–1980), English botanist
- Charles Hubbard (politician) (1940–2020), Canadian politician
- Chuck Hubbard (Charles Noble Hubbard, born 1962), U.S. Representative-elect from North Carolina
