= Egerton Hubbard, 2nd Baron Addington =

British politician (1842–1915)

Colonel The Right Honourable The Lord Addington VD
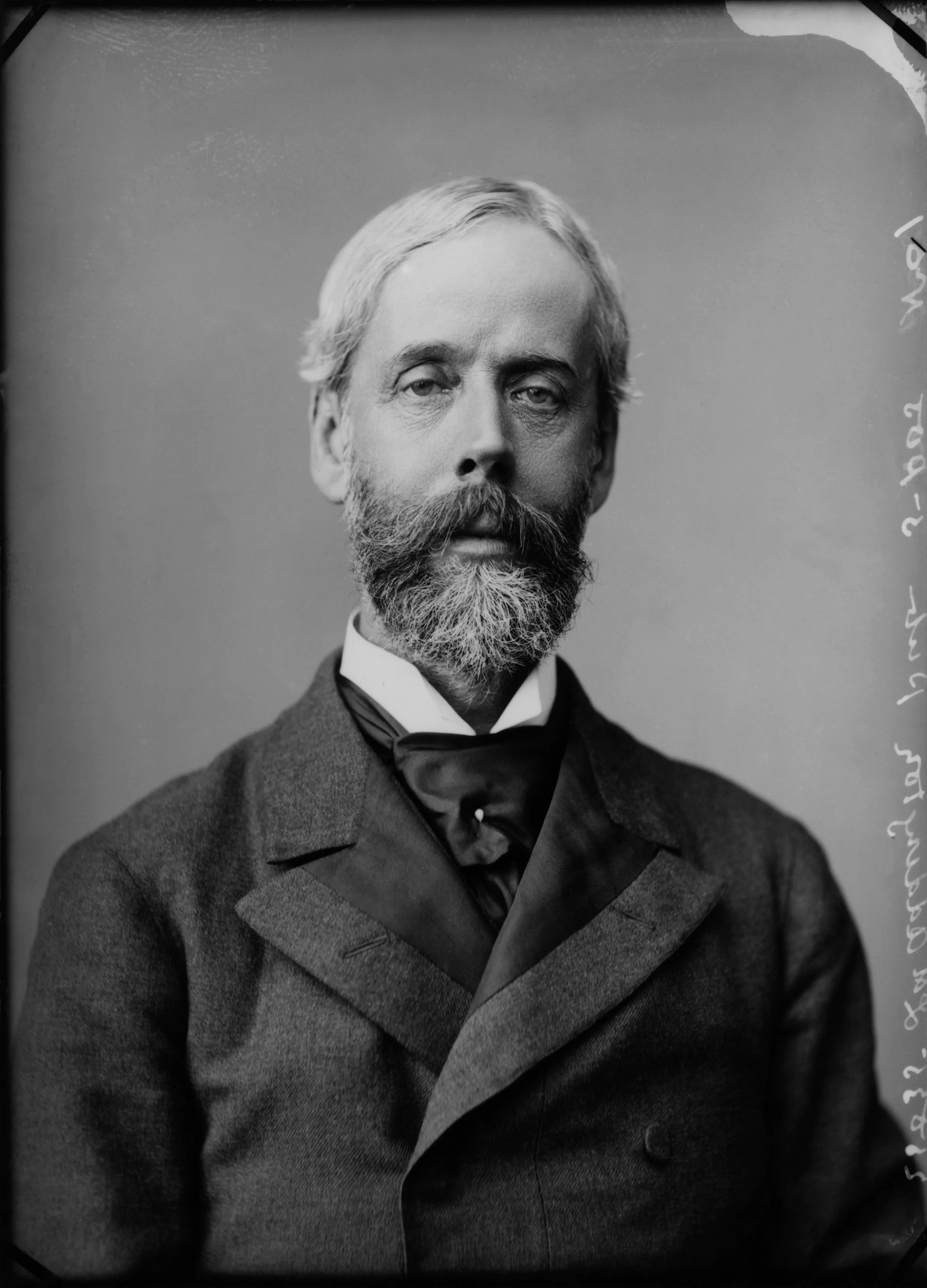
- Portrait of Baron Addington by Alexander Bassano, 1895

Member of the House of Lords Lord Temporal
- In office 29 August 1889 – 14 June 1915; Hereditary Peerage
- Preceded by: The 1st Lord Addington
- Succeeded by: The 3rd Lord Addington

Member of Parliament for Buckingham
- In office 27 July 1886 – 28 August 1889
- Preceded by: Sir Edmund Verney
- Succeeded by: Sir Edmund Verney
- In office 17 February 1874 – 31 March 1880
- Preceded by: Sir Harry Verney
- Succeeded by: Sir Harry Verney

Personal details
- Born: 29 December 1842
- Died: 14 June 1915 (aged 72)
- Party: Conservative
- Spouse: Mary Adelaide Portal (m. 1880)
- Children: 5, including John, Raymond, and Ruth
- Parent: John Hubbard, 1st Baron Addington (father)

Egerton Hubbard, 2nd Baron Addington VD (29 December 1842 – 14 June 1915) was a British Peer. He was Member of Parliament for Buckinghamshire from 1874 to 1880, and from 1886 to 1889.

== Life and career ==
The son of John Gellibrand Hubbard, 1st Baron Addington, he succeeded the Barony on the death of his father. He held the office of High Steward of Buckingham.

He was educated at Radley College, and graduated from Christ Church, Oxford, with a First B.A. in 1865, and with an M.A. in 1866. In 1863, he was commissioned into the 3rd Buckinghamshire Rifle Volunteer Corps (after 1875 amalgamated into the 1st Buckinghamshire Rifle Volunteers). He was promoted lieutenant in 1871, captain in 1887, major and lieutenant-colonel in 1890, and colonel in 1895. He resigned his commission in February 1900.

== Family ==
He married Mary Adelaide Portal, daughter of Sir Wyndham Portal, 1st Baronet, in June 1880. They had the following children:

- Winifred Mary Hubbard (1881–1968)
- John Gellibrand Hubbard, 3rd Baron Addington (1883–1966)
- Raymond Egerton Hubbard, 4th Baron Addington (1884–1971)
- Francis Spencer Hubbard (1888–1963)
- Ruth Mary Hubbard (1896–1955)

== Arms ==
Coat of arms of Egerton Hubbard, 2nd Baron Addington
Crest In front of a fasces fessewise Proper an eagle's head as in the arms. Escutcheon Vert a chevron engrailed plain cotised Argent between three eagles' heads erased of the second each gorged with a collar fleurettée Gules Supporters On either side an eagle Argent wings addorsed gorged with a collar fleurettée Gules and pendent therefrom an escutcheon Ermine charged with a rose Gules Motto Alta Petens (Latin for: Seeking Higher Things)

Parliament of the United Kingdom
Preceded by Sir Harry Verney, Bt	Member for Buckingham; 1874–1880	Succeeded by Sir Harry Verney, Bt
Preceded by Edmund Hope Verney	Member for Buckingham; 1886–1889	Succeeded by Edmund Hope Verney
Peerage of the United Kingdom
Preceded by John Gellibrand Hubbard	Baron Addington; 1889–1915	Succeeded by John Hubbard
