= Chuck Goldstein =

American football coach (born c. 1978)

Biographical details
- Born: c. 1977 (age 48–49); Germantown, Maryland, U.S.
- Education: Frostburg State University (1998); Salisbury University (2001); Concordia University Irvine (2015)

Playing career
- 1997–1998: Frostburg State
- 1999–2000: Salisbury State
- Position: Linebacker

Coaching career (HC unless noted)
- 2001: Averett (assistant)
- 2002–2004: Salisbury (LB)
- 2005–2008: North Point HS (MD) (OC)
- 2009: Gallaudet (OC)
- 2010–2024: Gallaudet

Head coaching record
- Overall: 57–72
- Tournaments: 0–2 (NCAA D-III playoffs)

Accomplishments and honors

Championships
- 3 ECFC (2013, 2022–2023)

Awards
- 2× ECFC Coach of the Year (2013, 2022)

Chuck Goldstein (born c. 1978) is an American college football coach. He was the head football coach for Gallaudet University from 2010 to 2024. He also coached for Averett, Salisbury, and North Point High School. He played college football for Frostburg State and Salisbury State as a linebacker.

== Head coaching record ==
Year	Team	Overall	Conference	Standing	Bowl/playoffs
Gallaudet Bison (Eastern Collegiate Football Conference) (2010–2024)
2010	Gallaudet	3–5	3–4	5th	
2011	Gallaudet	5–5	4–3	4th	
2012	Gallaudet	7–3	5–2	3rd	
2013	Gallaudet	9–2	6–1	T–1st	L NCAA Division III First Round
2014	Gallaudet	2–7	2–5	6th	
2015	Gallaudet	0–9	0–7	8th	
2016	Gallaudet	2–8	1–6	T–7th	
2017	Gallaudet	3–7	3–4	T–4th	
2018	Gallaudet	3–5	3–3	4th	
2019	Gallaudet	2–6	2–3	T–3rd	
2020–21	No team—COVID-19				
2021	Gallaudet	5–3	3–3	T–4th	
2022	Gallaudet	7–3	5–1	1st	L NCAA Division III First Round
2023	Gallaudet	4–5	3–1	T–1st	
2024	Gallaudet	5–4	2–1	T–1st	
Gallaudet:		57–72	42–44		
Total:		57–72			
National championship Conference title Conference division title or championship game berth
