= Phil Hubbard (footballer) =

English footballer

Philip John Hubbard (born 25 January 1949) is a former professional footballer.

Hubbard, a midfielder, began his career as an apprentice with Lincoln City before playing for Norwich City, Grimsby Town, a second spell at Lincoln and Boston United. He had a short spell as player/manager at Skegness Town. He was highly regarded at Lincoln and in 2006 was voted 28th in Lincoln's 100 league legends.

In 1972, Hubbard signed for Grimsby Town for a club record of £20,000. He went on to make 150 appearances for the Mariners, scoring almost 40 goals as a striker and midfielder.

In November 2003, Phil became manager of Nettleham where he remained until February 2006 when he left to become manager of Spalding United. He was dismissed from his role at Spalding on 24 September 2007.

He was a member of the Norwich squad that won the second division championship in 1972 and played over 400 professional games in his career.

== Honours ==
- Second Division Championship 1971-72
