= William Ashhurst =

British banker, merchant and politician

Sir William Ashhurst
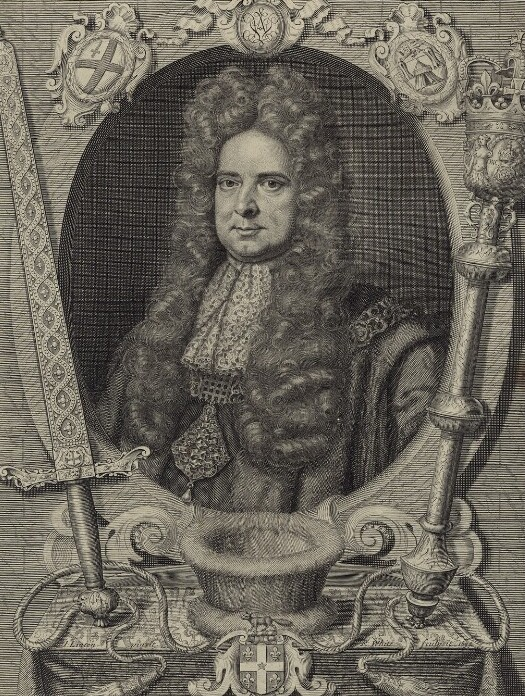

Sheriff of London
- In office 1691–1692

Lord Mayor of London
- In office 1693–1694
- Preceded by: Sir John Fleet
- Succeeded by: Sir Thomas Lane

Member of Parliament for City of London
- In office 1689–1690
- In office 1695–1702
- In office 1705–1710

Personal details
- Born: 26 April 1647
- Died: 12 January 1720 (aged 72)
- Party: Whig
- Parents: Henry Ashurst (father); Judith Reresby (mother)

Sir William Ashhurst (26 April 1647 – 12 January 1720) was a British banker, merchant and Whig politician who sat in the English and British House of Commons from 1689 to 1710. He also served as the Lord Mayor of London in 1693.

== Early life ==
Ashurst was the son of Henry Ashurst, Merchant Taylor, of Watling Street and Hackney, Middlesex, and his wife was Judith Reresby, daughter of William Reresby, merchant, of London. He was apprenticed to his father in 1662, and became a Freeman of the Merchant Taylor's Company in 1669. He married Elizabeth Thompson, the daughter of Robert Thompson, merchant, of Newington Green, Surrey, by licence dated 31 August 1668.

== Career ==
Ashurst became a successful woollen draper, trading with North America. In c1675, he acquired the house of William Blake (founder of the Ladies Charity School) in Highgate, and built a mansion, Ashhurst House. Prior to Blake's residence, it had been part of Arundel House. St Michael's Church now occupies its site.

In 1679 he entered politics, becoming a Common Councilman for Bread Street Ward. On his father's death in 1680 he inherited property in Watling Street, Castle Hedingham in Essex and six other houses. He became a member and treasurer of the New England Company in 1681 and was Auditor of Bridgehouse accounts from 1682 to 1684.

Ashurst was appointed Deputy Lieutenant in 1687 and elected Alderman for Bread Street on 12 August 1687. He became Master of the Merchant Taylors Company for the year 1687 to 1688 and was knighted on 29 October 1687. In 1688, he changed wards and became Alderman for Billingsgate. He was also appointed President of Christ's Hospital in 1688. He was a good friend of Edmund Calamy and was a nonconformist like the rest of his family, so he was an active supporter of the Glorious Revolution. In 1689 he became Colonel of the Yellow Regiment, London Trained Bands, for a year and Vice-President of the Honourable Artillery Company (HAC) from 1689 to 1703. He also became a J.P. for Middlesex, and at the 1689 English general election was returned as Whig Member of Parliament for the City of London in the Convention Parliament (1689). He was then appointed as Commissioner for preventing the export of wool from 1689 to 1692.

Ashurst was defeated when he stood for the City of London at the 1690 English general election but was elected Sheriff of London for the year 1691 to 1692. He was defeated again when he stood at a by-election for the City of London on 2 March 1693. He was chosen as Lord Mayor of London for the year 1693 to 1694. During his term there was a reported miracle when a Huguenot girl named Marie Maillard reported that her lameness had suddenly disappeared while she was reading the bible. She was summoned to see Ashurst and examined by three bishops and four surgeons. The physician James Wellwood published an account of the case which was published and addressed to the Lady Mayoress.

Ashurst was Colonel of the White Regiment from 1694 to 1702. At the 1695 English general election he was returned again as MP for the City of London and signed the Association on 27 February 1696. He became relatively active in Parliament, supporting a measure to repair the highways of Islington and St. Pancras and he supported the attainder of Sir John Fenwick in November 1696. He became a governor of the New England Company in 1696 for the rest of his life. In January 1697, he presented a bill in Parliament to complete the building of St Paul's cathedral. He became a Director of the Bank of England in 1697 and served with statutory intervals until 1714. In 1697 he became a Governor of Highgate School. In July 1698, he was appointed to a lucrative post as a Commissioner for excise and was returned again as MP for the City at the 1698 English general election. He voted with the Court Whigs against the Disbanding Bill in 1698 and 1699 and for of the standing army on 18 January 1699. Place legislation was passed in 1700 which prevented Excise Commissioners from sitting in Parliament, and he resigned his place on the Commission. He was returned to Parliament again at the two general election of 1701, but was defeated at the 1702 English general election.

Ashurst was returned to Parliament again as a Whig at the 1705 English general election and voted for the Court candidate for Speaker on 25 October 1705. He supported the Court in its proceedings on the place clause in the regency bill on 18 February 1706 and was rewarded with a post as a commissioner for receiving the loan to the Emperor. He served on several drafting committees and was concerned with a bill to encourage the Royal Lustring Company, He was a colonel of the White regiment again from 1707 to 1710. At the 1708 British general election he was returned again as Whig MP for the City of London. He became President of the Honourable Artillery Company in 1708. In Parliament he supported the naturalization of the Palatines in 1709, and voted for the impeachment of Dr. Sacheverell in 1710. He became Deputy Lieutenant again by 1710. He was defeated at the 1710 British general election. In 1714, he was re-appointed Commissioner for Excise which precluded him from standing for Parliament again. He also became Colonel of the White regiment for the rest of his life. By 1719 he was a Governor of St Thomas' Hospital.

== Later life and legacy ==
When in the country Ashurst lived in a Queen Anne style red-brick mansion he built in the outer bailey of Hedingham Castle after his purchase of the castle in 1693. He died on 12 January 1720, 'after a very long indisposition'. He and his wife had seven sons and four daughters of whom a son and a daughter predeceased him.

== Notes ==
Parliament of England
Preceded by Sir Patience Ward; Sir Robert Clayton; Sir Thomas Pilkington; William Love	Member of Parliament for City of London; 1689–1690; With: Sir Patience Ward; Sir Robert Clayton; Sir Thomas Pilkington	Succeeded by Sir William Prichard; Sir Samuel Dashwood; Sir William Turner; Sir Thomas Vernon
Preceded by Sir William Prichard; Sir Samuel Dashwood; Sir John Fleet; Sir Thomas Vernon	Member of Parliament for City of London; 1695–1702; With: Thomas Papillon 1695–1701; Sir Robert Clayton 1695–1698, 1701–1702; Sir James Houblon 1698–1701; Sir John Fleet 1695–1701, Mar–Nov 1701; Gilbert Heathcote Feb–Mar 1701, Nov 1701–1702; Sir William Withers Feb–Nov 1701; Sir Thomas Abney 1701–1702	Succeeded by Sir William Prichard; Sir John Fleet; Sir Gilbert Heathcote; Sir Francis Child
Preceded by Sir William Prichard; Sir John Fleet; Sir Gilbert Heathcote; Sir Francis Child	Member of Parliament for City of London; 1705–1707; With: Sir Robert Clayton; Samuel Shepheard; Sir Gilbert Heathcote	Succeeded by Parliament of Great Britain
Parliament of Great Britain
Preceded by Parliament of England	Member of Parliament for City of London; 1707–1710; With: Sir William Withers; Samuel Shepheard 1707–1708; Sir John Ward 1708–1710; Sir Gilbert Heathcote	Succeeded by Sir William Withers; Sir Richard Hoare; Sir George Newland; Sir John Cass
Political offices
Preceded by Sir John Fleet	Lord Mayor of London; 1693–1694	Succeeded by Sir Thomas Lane
