= Thomas Vernon (merchant) =

British merchant & politician (1631-1711)

Sir Thomas Vernon
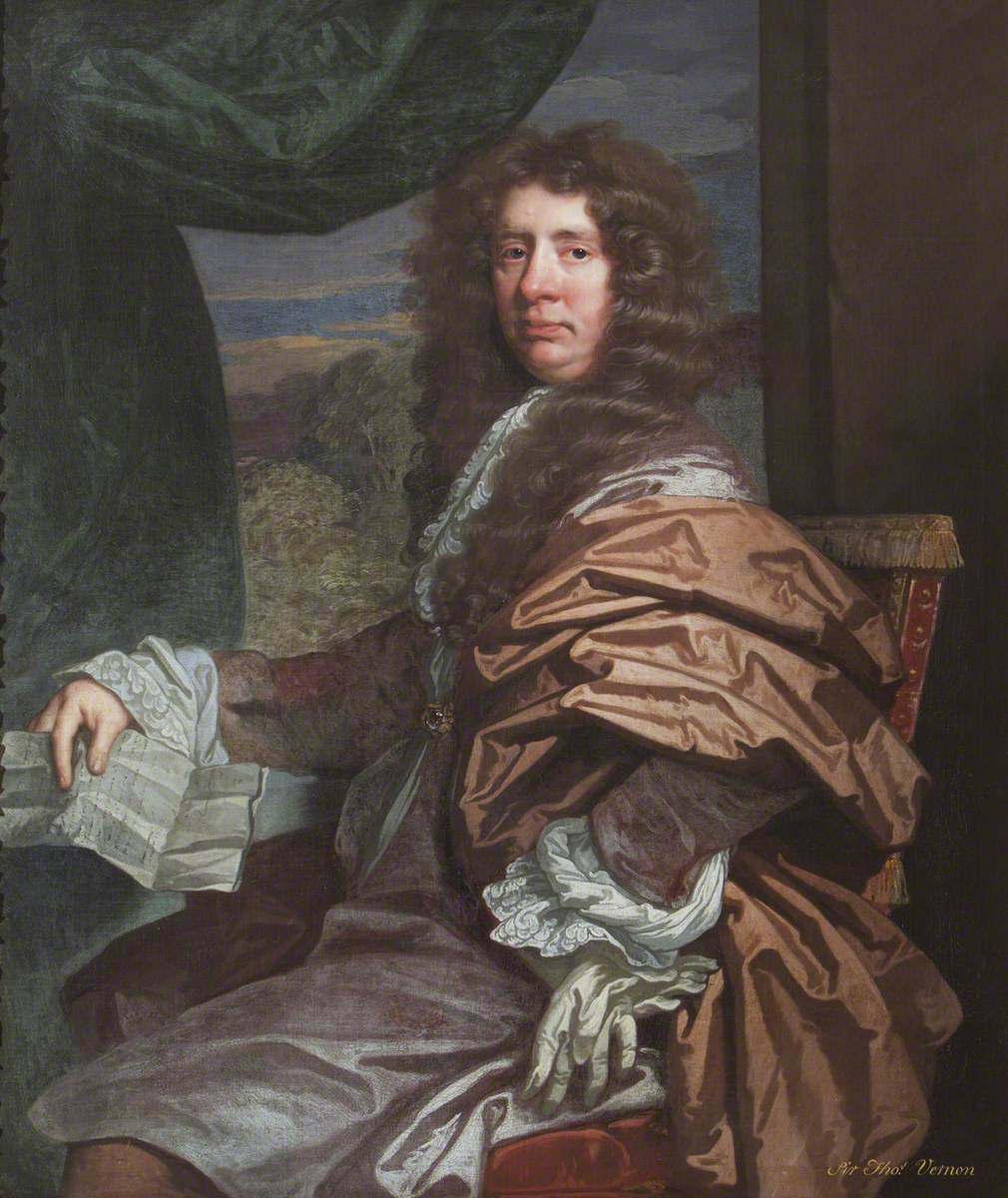

Member of Parliament for City of London
- In office 1690–1695 Serving with William Turner, William Prichard, Samuel Dashwood
- Preceded by: Patience Ward; Robert Clayton; Thomas Pilkington; William Ashhurst
- Succeeded by: Robert Clayton; William Ashhurst; Thomas Papillon

Personal details
- Born: 10 December 1631
- Died: 10 February 1711 (aged 79)
- Spouse: Ann Weston (m. 1660; died 1702)
- Relations: Sir George Vernon (brother); Henry Vernon (grandson); Edmund Waller (grandson); Harry Waller (grandson)
- Children: 12
- Parent(s): Henry Vernon; Joan Winter

Sir Thomas Vernon (10 December 1631 – 10 February 1711) was a London merchant and director of the East India Company who served in the Parliament of England.

== Early life ==
Vernon was baptized on 10 December 1631. He was the second son of Henry Vernon (d. 1657) of Farnham, Surrey, by Joan Winter, a daughter of John Winter of Preshaw, Corhampton. His elder brother was Sir George Vernon who succeeded to their father's estates in 1657.

== Career ==
The son of a Surrey gentleman, Vernon established himself as a merchant in London, specialising in trade with the Ottoman Empire. He was a member of the Levant Company in 1657, assistant from 1663–1670, 1684–1685, 1686–1691, 1693, 1697–1698, Husband 1671–1683. He also served as assistant to the Royal African Company from 1672–1674, 1677–1679, and 1682–1684. He was a member of the Eastland Company in 1687.

A Freeman, Haberdashers' Company in 1661, Master in 1685. He was a common councilman for London 1676–1680, 1682–1683, 1691–1693, 1696, and auditor 1683–1684. He was elected to the Parliament of England to represent the City of London from 1690 to 1695.

Vernon was knighted on 8 March 1685.

== Personal life ==
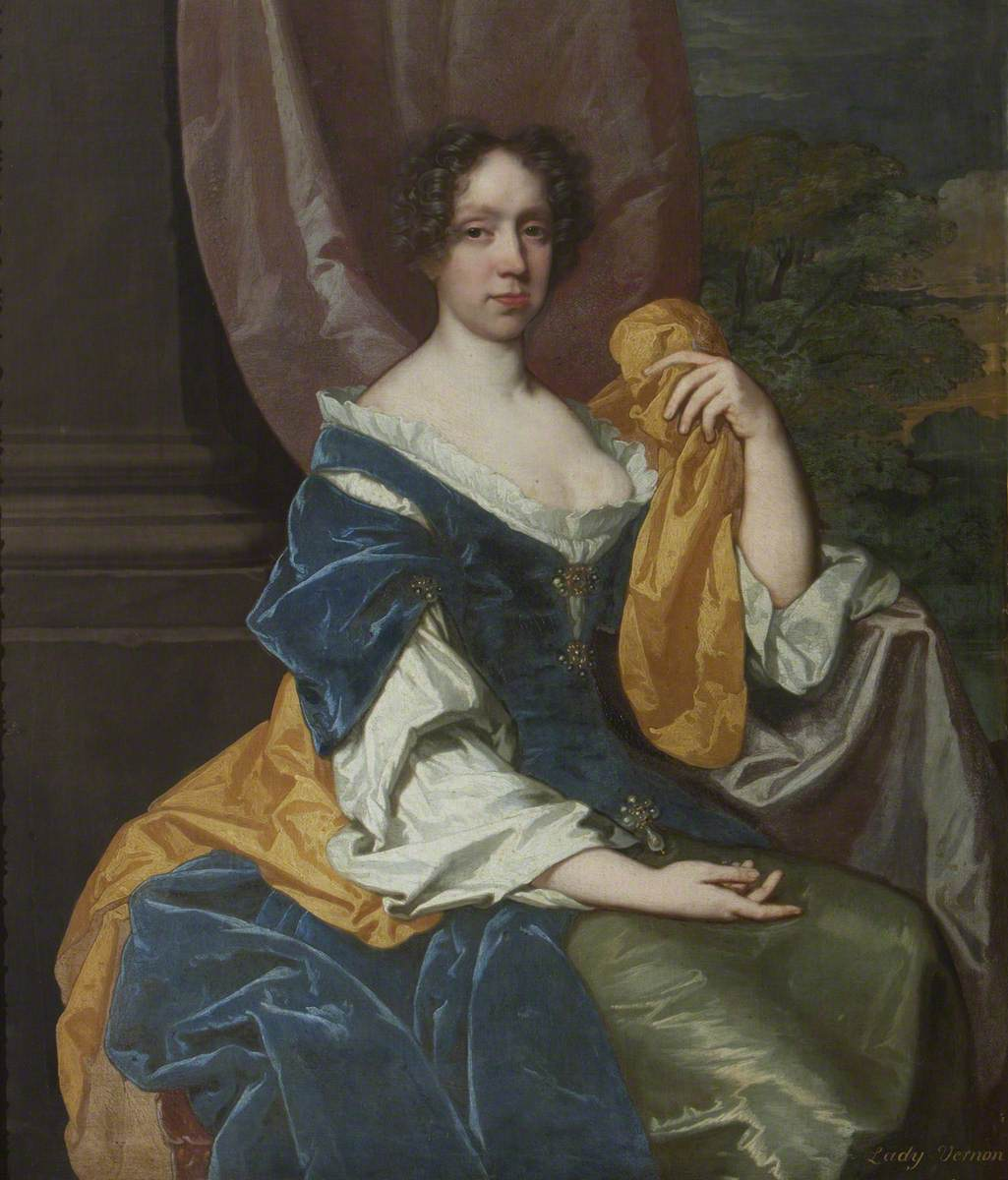
Portrait of his wife, Anne Weston, by John Riley, c. 1660

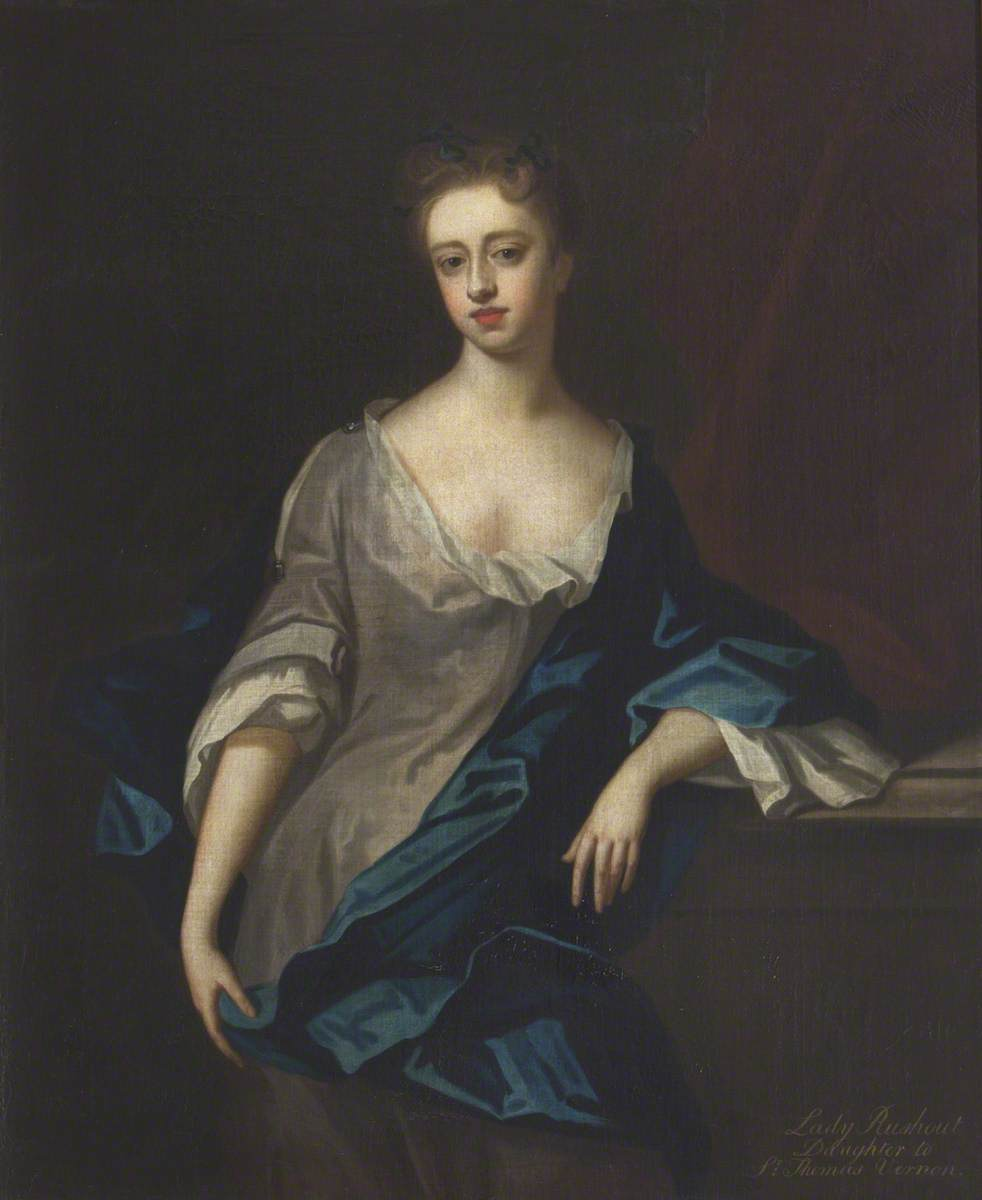
Portrait of his daughter, Arabella, Lady Rushout, by Michael Dahl, c. 1700

On 13 December 1660, Vernon married Ann Weston (d. 1702), a daughter of Henry Weston of Ockham, Surrey and sister of John Weston, MP for Guildford and Surrey. Together, they had four sons, including one who predeceased him, and eight daughters. By January 1703 he had settled in Sudbury, Derbyshire, the home of his son-in-law George Vernon.

- Catherine Vernon (c. 1661–1710), who married, as his third wife, George Vernon, MP for Derby, in 1681.
- Henry Vernon (c. 1665–1691), who died unmarried.
- Thomas Vernon (1666–1726), MP for Whitchurch; he married Jane (d. 1742).
- Arabella Vernon (1670–1705), who married Sir James Rushout, 2nd Baronet, MP for Evesham, and eldest surviving son of Sir James Rushout, 1st Baronet.
- Matilda Vernon (c. 1672–1732), who married Anthony Balam. After his death, she married Sir Henry Furnese, 1st Baronet.
- Judith Vernon (1676–c. 1740), who married Dr. Stephen Waller of Hall Barn. After his death she married John Aislabie, Chancellor of the Exchequer under George I, in 1713.
- Sir Charles Vernon (c. 1683–1762), who became an MP for Chipping Wycombe and Ripon; he married Anne Catherine Vernon, daughter of George Vernon of Farnham.

Sir Thomas died on 10 February 1711 and the bulk of his estate, which included a lease of the rectory of Farnham, Surrey, passed to his eldest surviving son, Thomas.

=== Descendants ===
Through his daughter Catherine, he was the grandfather of Henry Vernon (1686–1719), MP for Staffordshire and Newcastle-under-Lyme who married Anne Pigott and was the father of George Venables-Vernon, 1st Baron Vernon.

Through his daughter Judith, he was a grandfather of Edmund Waller (c. 1699–1771), MP for Wycombe and Great Marlow, and Harry Waller (c. 1701–1772), MP for Chipping Wycombe.

Through his son Charles, he was a grandfather of Elizabeth Vernon, who married, as his second wife, her step-cousin, William Aislabie, MP for Ripon. William's first wife was Lady Elizabeth Cecil (a daughter of John Cecil, 6th Earl of Exeter).

Parliament of England
Preceded by Patience Ward; Robert Clayton; Thomas Pilkington; William Ashhurst	Member of Parliament for City of London; 1690–1695; With: William Turner; William Prichard; Samuel Dashwood	Succeeded by Robert Clayton; William Ashhurst; Thomas Papillon
