= Robert Clayton (City of London MP) =

British merchant banker and politician

The Rt. Hon. Sir Robert Clayton
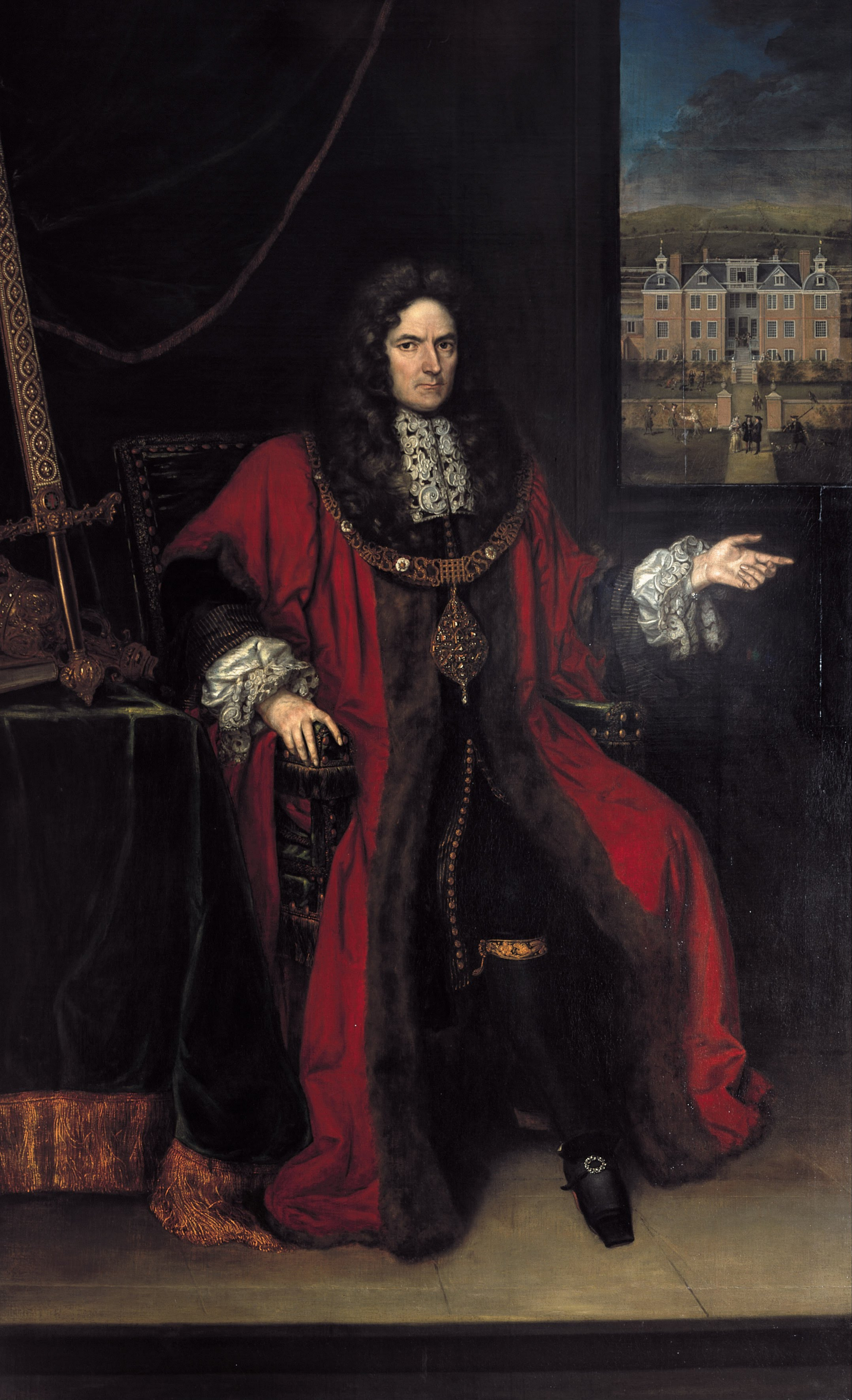
- Robert Clayton by Laureys a Castro

Lord Mayor of London
- In office 1679–1680
- Preceded by: James Edwards (Lord Mayor)
- Succeeded by: Patience Ward

Personal details
- Born: 1629 Northamptonshire
- Died: 1707 (aged 77–78)
- Occupation: Banker, politician

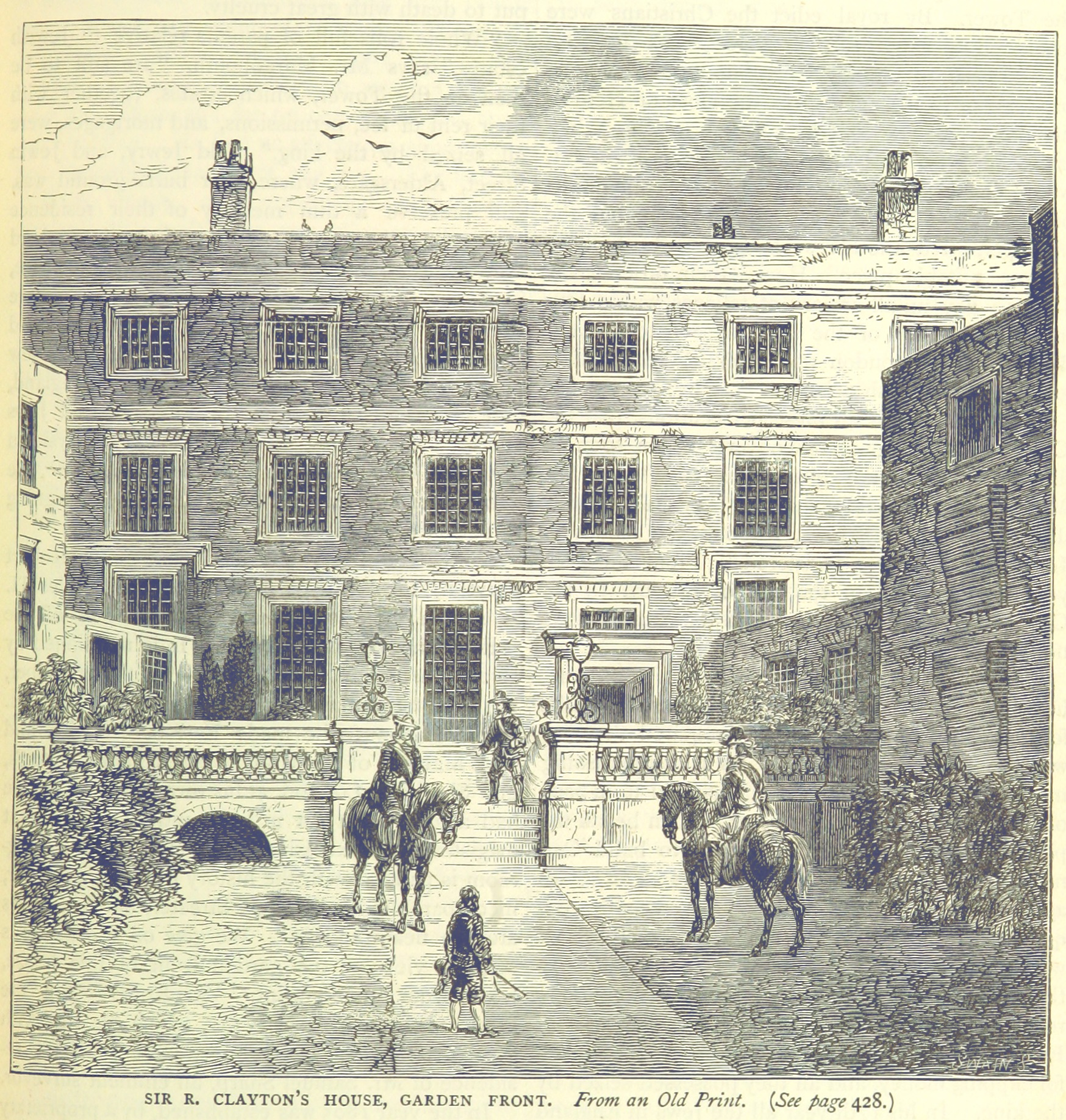
Garden front of Sir Robert Clayton's house at No 8 Old Jewry in the 17th century

Sir Robert Clayton (1629–1707) was an English merchant banker, politician and Lord Mayor of London.

== Life ==
Robert Clayton was born in Northamptonshire, England. He became an apprentice to his uncle, a London scrivener, where he met a fellow apprentice, Alderman John Morris. They became successful businessmen and established the bank, Clayton & Morris Co.

Clayton entered politics, representing London and Bletchingley alternately as a Whig between 1679 and his death in 1707. He was knighted in 1671. Clayton made a considerable fortune. In 1697 he lent the king £30,000 to pay for the army. In the mid-1650s Clayton purchased Brownsea Island and its castle.

He was president of the St Thomas' Hospital in London which was then located in the Borough. He employed Thomas Cartwright to rebuild the hospital and St Thomas Church nearby.

Robert Clayton was a member of the Scriveners and Drapers Company, an Alderman of Cheap Ward in the City of London (1670–1683), a Sheriff in 1671, Lord Mayor of London (1679–1680), a member of parliament for the City of London or Bletchingley for most of the years 1679 to 1707, Colonel of the Orange Regiment, London Trained Bands (various times, 1680–1702), President of the Honourable Artillery Company (1690–1703), Commissioner of the Customs (1689–1697), an Assistant to the Royal African Company (1672–1681) and a director of the Bank of England (1702–1707).

In the 1690s, Clayton was the head of the earliest known Freemason lodge entirely made-up of non-working masons in London.

== Links to slavery ==
As a member of the Court of Assistants to the Royal African Company, Clayton was essentially on the board of directors. The Royal African Company shipped more African slaves to the Americas than any other institution in the history of the Atlantic slave trade. Clayton married Martha Trott, who was the daughter of a Bermuda merchant, and also acted as Factor in Bermuda.

== Legacy ==
The tomb of Sir Robert and Lady Clayton is in St Mary's church, Bletchingley.

A statue of Clayton stood at the North Entrance to Ward Block of North Wing at St Thomas' Hospital and is Grade I listed. On 11 June 2020, a joint statement from the Guy's and St Thomas' NHS Foundation Trust announced that Clayton's statue, together with that of Thomas Guy, would be removed from public view. Both statues have subsequently been put back on display.

== Sources ==
- Courtney, William Prideaux (1887). "Clayton, Robert (1629-1707)" . In Stephen, Leslie (ed.). Dictionary of National Biography. Vol. 11. London: Smith, Elder & Co.
- Robert Clayton information from AIM25.
- Catalogue record for the papers of Clayton and Morris Co. at the Archives Division of the London School of Economics.
- Melton, F. C., Sir Robert Clayton and the Origins of English Deposit Banking, 1658–1685, Cambridge, 1986.

Dr. J.P. Dickson. MA., MB., BChir.(Cantab). St. Thomas's staff 1955. Personal reminiscence.

- Jacob, Margaret C. (2006). The Radical Enlightenment : Pantheists, Freemasons, and Republicans. Lafayette, LA: Cornerstone Book. OCLC 1285756202.

Parliament of England
| Preceded by Sir John Frederick; William Love; Sir William Thompson; John Jones | Member of Parliament for City of London; 1679–1681; With: William Love; Sir Thomas Player; Thomas Pilkington | Succeeded by Sir John Moore; Sir William Prichard; Sir Samuel Dashwood; Sir Peter Rich |
| Preceded by Sir John Moore; Sir William Prichard; Sir Samuel Dashwood; Sir Peter Rich | Member of Parliament for City of London; 1689–1690; With: Sir Patience Ward; William Love; Thomas Pilkington | Succeeded by Sir William Prichard; Sir Samuel Dashwood; William Turner; Sir Thomas Vernon |
| Preceded by Thomas Howard; Jeffrey Amherst (MP) | Member of Parliament for Bletchingley; 1690–1695; With: Thomas Howard | Succeeded by Thomas Howard; Maurice Thompson |
| Preceded by Sir John Fleet; Sir Samuel Dashwood; Sir Thomas Vernon; Sir William Prichard | Member of Parliament for City of London; 1695–1698; With: Sir John Fleet; Sir William Ashhurst; Thomas Papillon | Succeeded by Sir William Ashhurst; Sir John Fleet; Sir James Houblon; Thomas Papillon |
| Preceded by Thomas Howard; Maurice Thompson | Member of Parliament for Bletchingley; 1698–1701; With: Hugh Hare | Succeeded by Sir Edward Gresham, Bt; John Ward |
| Preceded by Sir William Ashhurst; Sir John Fleet; Sir James Houblon; Thomas Papillon | Member of Parliament for City of London; 1701–1702; With: Sir William Ashhurst to 1702; Sir William Withers to November 1701; Sir Gilbert Heathcote to February 1701; Sir John Fleet March–November 1701; Sir Thomas Abney from November 1701; Sir Gilbert Heathcote from November 1701 | Succeeded by Sir William Prichard; Sir Gilbert Heathcote; Sir John Fleet; Sir Francis Child |
| Preceded by John Ward; John Evelyn | Member of Parliament for Bletchingley; 1702–1705; With: John Ward | Succeeded by John Ward; George Evelyn |
| Preceded by Sir William Prichard; Sir Gilbert Heathcote; Sir John Fleet; Sir Francis Child | Member of Parliament for City of London; 1705–1707; With: Sir Gilbert Heathcote; Samuel Shepheard; Sir William Ashhurst | Succeeded by Sir William Withers; Samuel Shepheard; Sir William Ashhurst; Sir Gilbert Heathcote |
Civic offices
| Preceded by James Edwards (Lord Mayor) | Lord Mayor of London; 1679–1680 | Succeeded by Patience Ward |
