= Sir Gilbert Heathcote, 1st Baronet =

British merchant and politician

Sir Gilbert Heathcote Bt
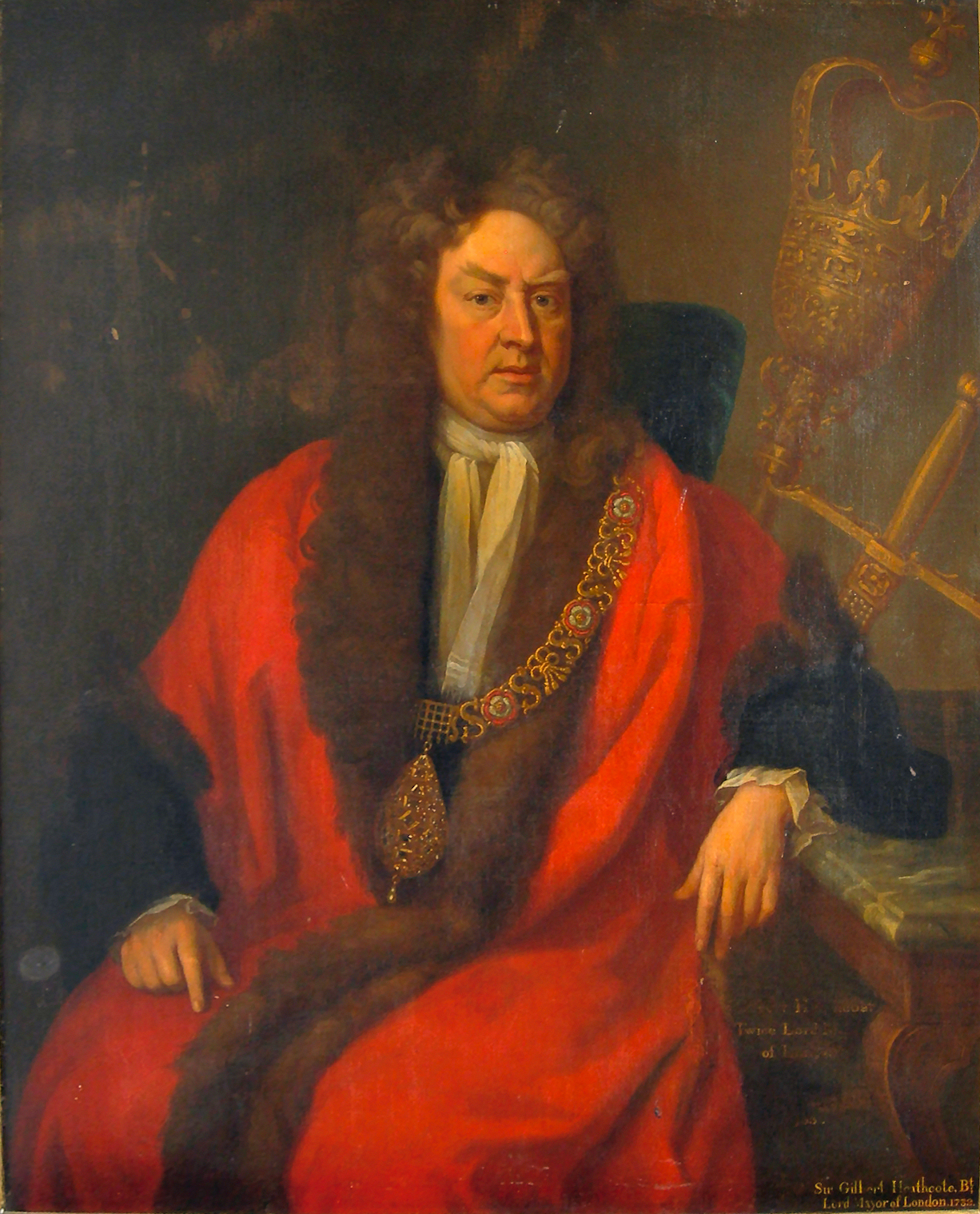

Sheriff of London
- In office 1703–1704

Lord Mayor of London
- In office 1710–1711
- Preceded by: Sir Samuel Garrard
- Succeeded by: Sir Robert Beachcroft

Governor of the Bank of England
- In office 1694–1733

Member of Parliament for City of London
- In office 1701–1710

Member of Parliament for Helston
- In office 1715–1722

Member of Parliament for Lymington
- In office 1722–1727

Member of Parliament for St Germans
- In office 1727–1733

Personal details
- Born: 2 January 1652 Chesterfield, Derbyshire
- Died: 25 January 1733 (aged 81) London, England
- Party: Whig
- Spouse: Hester Rayner (m. 1765)
- Children: 2, including Elizabeth

Sir Gilbert Heathcote, 1st Baronet (2 January 1652 – 25 January 1733) was a British merchant and Whig politician who sat in the English and British House of Commons between 1701 and 1733. He also served as the governor of the Bank of England and was Lord Mayor of London in 1711.

== Early life ==
Heathcote was the eldest son of Gilbert Heathcote of Chesterfield, Derbyshire, and his wife, Anne Dickons, daughter of George Dickons of Chesterfield. He began his apprenticeship as a merchant overseas, and returned to England in 1680 to set himself up as a City trader. He became a Freeman of the Vintners' Company in 1681. He had at least one brother, John. On 30 May 1682, he married Hester Rayner, daughter of Christopher Rayner, merchant, of London. He was living in the parish of St Dunstan's-in-the-East in 1682 and established a business as a merchant in St Swithin's Lane trading in Spanish wines and other produce. He took his first step in Corporation government when elected Common Councilman for Walbrook ward in 1689. In 1690, he succeeded his father.

Heathcote was an agent for Jamaica from 1693 to 1704, furnishing remittances on behalf of the government for the troops there. He also traded extensively with the East Indies.

In 1693, the ship Redbridge, of which he was part owner, was detained by the East India Company, which claimed a monopoly of the trade with India. He asserted at the bar of the House of Commons his right to trade wherever he pleased, unless restrained by Parliament, and the house declared by resolution against the company's monopoly. Heathcote promoted the bill for a new East India Company. In 1694 he was a Commissioner taking subscriptions to the Bank of England and selected by ballot as a director of the bank from then, with statutory intervals for the rest of his life. He was a commissioner for Greenwich Hospital in 1695. In 1697 he was a trustee for Exchequer bills and became treasurer of the Eastland Company until 1699.

At a meeting of this company, held in London about 1698, Peter the Great was present, and was addressed by Heathcote 'in high Dutch' with reference to the importation of tobacco into his dominions. In 1698, he was a Commissioner for taking subscriptions to the New East India Company loan subscribing 10,000l. of its capital himself. He was a member of a committee of seven to arrange matters with the old company and became a Director of the new Company until 1704.

== Political career ==
In 1708, Sir Gilbert Heathcote and his brothers were granted a new set of arms, Ermine, three pommes, each charged with a cross or, which added the ermine field to the ancient Heathcote arms, previously argent.

At the 1698 English general election Heathcote stood for Parliament for the City of London, but was defeated. He became a member of the Russia Company in 1699. In 1700, he was master of the Vintners' Company. He was returned as Member of Parliament for City of London at the first general election of 1701 but was expelled on 20 March 1701 for his share in the circulation of some exchequer bills. He was however returned at the second general election of 1701.

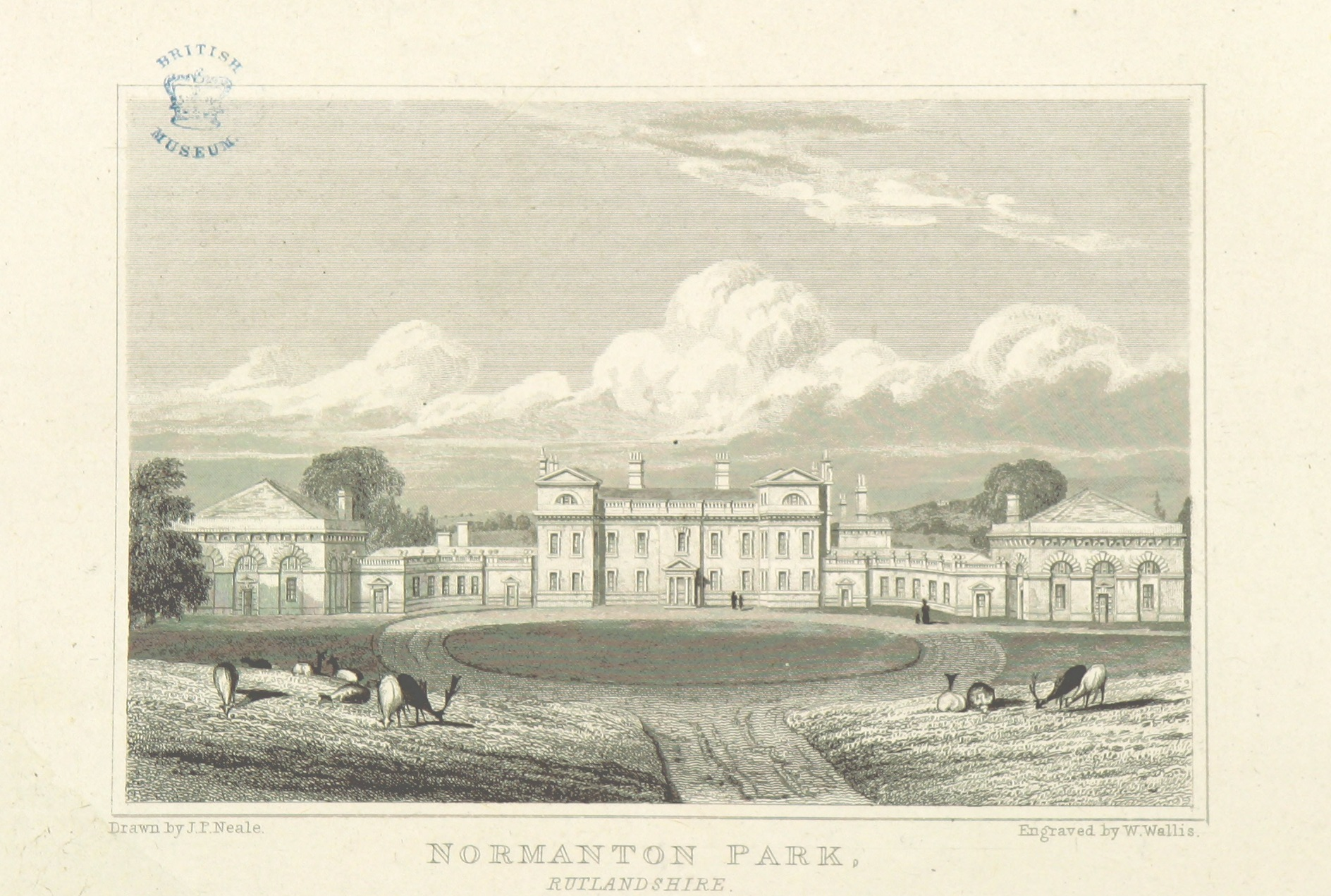
Normanton Park, Rutland

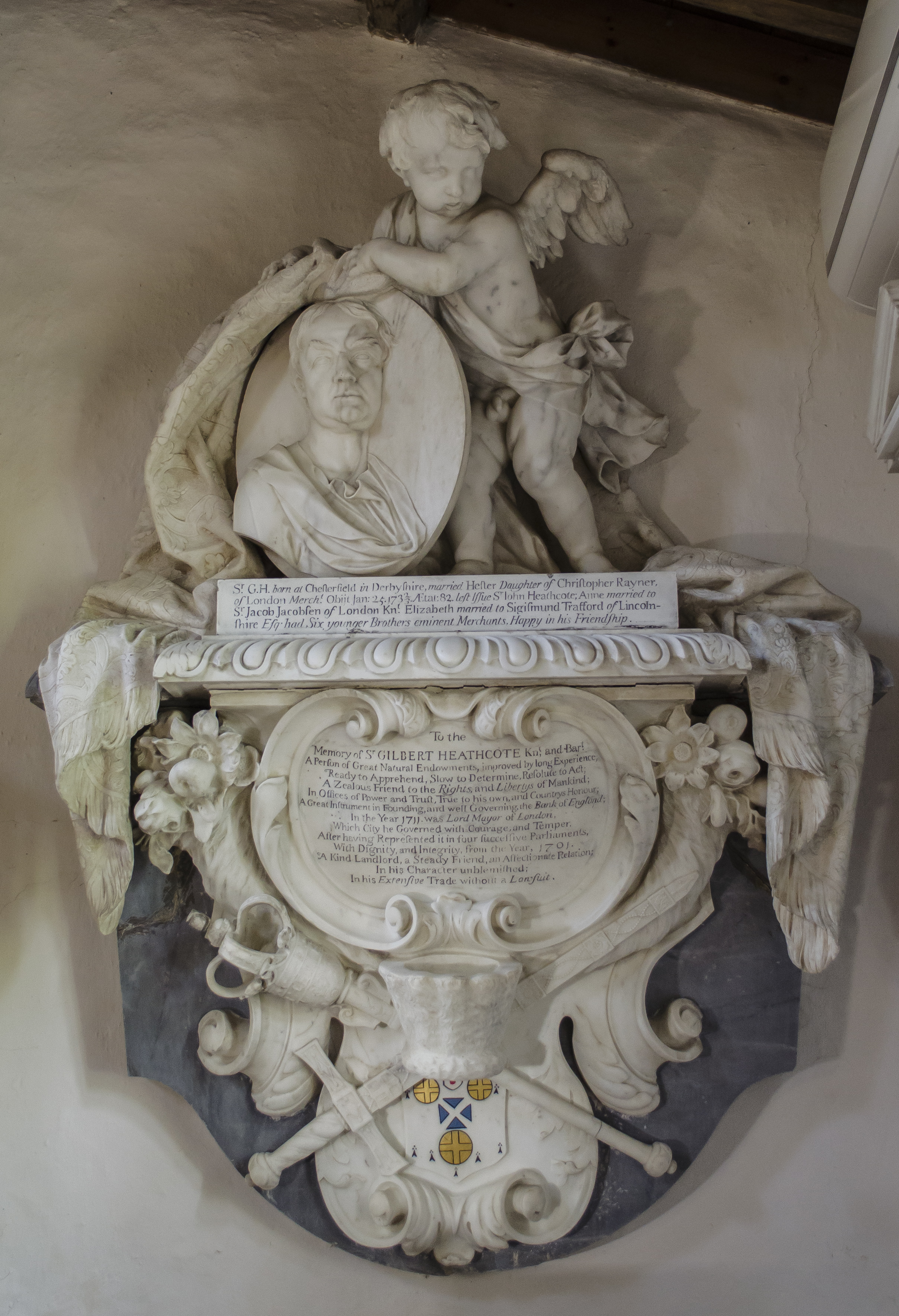
Memorial to Sir Gilbert Heathcote, now in the Church of St Mary the Virgin, Edith Weston

Heathcote became an alderman for Walbrook on 30 June 1702, and was returned again as MP for London at the 1702 English general election. He was knighted by the Queen on 29 October 1702, when she was dining at banquet at the Guildhall. He was also a manager of the united trade of the English company trading with the East Indies from 1702 to 1704.

He was elected as Sheriff of London on midsummer-day 1703, having been fined in 1698 for declining the office, and served for the year 1703 to 1704. In 1705, he was elected a Fellow of the Royal Society. He was a manager of the united trade again from 1705 to 1709. At the 1705 English general election he was returned again as MP for the City of London. He was a trustee for receiving the loan to the Emperor in 1706. From 1707 to 1710, he was a Colonel of the Blue Regiment of the city Militia, and was treasurer of the Honourable Artillery Company (HAC) from 1708 to 1711. At the 1708 British general election he was returned again as MP for the City of London. He was governor of the Bank of England from 1709 to 1711.

By an act of parliament extending the Bank's charter to 1710, Heathcote's gain was said to be £60,000. At the 1710 general election he lost his parliamentary seat for the City of London.

In 1710, when Heathcote was next in seniority for election as Lord Mayor of London, he was strongly opposed by the court party, who objected to the remonstrance he addressed to the queen, but the court of aldermen finally elected him and he served from 1710 to 1711. He was unpopular and for this reason his Lord Mayor's procession to Westminster on 30 October was cut short, and the livery companies attended him by water in their barges.

He was the last Lord Mayor to ride on horseback in the Mayoral procession.

He was vice-president of the HAC from 1711 to 1720 and resumed his command of the Blue Regiment in 1714 remaining as colonel for the rest of his life.

At the 1715 British general election Heathcote was returned as MP for Helston. He was appointed Commissioner for fifty new churches in 1715, remaining until 1727.

By 1719, he was Governor of the Eastland Company. He was president of the HAC from 1720 for the rest of his life. At the 1722 British general election, he was returned as MP for New Lymington. He became president of St Thomas' Hospital in 1722 for the rest of his life.

In 1725, he changed wards and became Alderman for Bridge Without ward, for the rest of his life. At the 1727 British general election he was returned as MP for St Germans. He purchased Normanton Hall, Rutland, in 1729 from Sir Thomas Mackworth, 4th Baronet. He was appointed a commissioner for the colony of Georgia in October 1732, and obtained much support for the proposal from his fellow-directors of the Bank of England. He was created a baronet in 1733, eight days before his death.

Although extremely rich, Heathcote's meanness is referred to by Pope; and it was this trait that accounts largely for his unpopularity with the populace. He died in London on 25 January 1733 and was buried at St Matthew's Church, Normanton, Rutland. A monument by the Flemish sculptor Rysbrack is now in St Mary's Church, Edith Weston. Caleb Heathcote was his brother.

== Links to slavery ==
Heathcote held shares in the South Sea Company (SSC), a British joint-stock company which was granted the Asiento de Negros by the Spanish Empire, which allowed the SSC to export slaves to Spain's American colonies as part of the Atlantic slave trade. However, according to University College London's Legacies of British Slave-ownership, Heathcote never owned slaves in the British colony of Jamaica. In response to news of Heathcote's links to slavery, the Gilbert Heathcote School in Chesterfield renamed itself in 2021 as the "Whittington Moor Nursery and Infant Academy".

== Descendants ==
A descendant, Sir Gilbert John Heathcote, 5th Baronet (1795–1867), was created Baron Aveland in 1856; and his son Gilbert Henry, who in 1888 inherited from his mother the barony of Willoughby de Eresby, became 1st Earl of Ancaster in 1892.

== See also ==
- Heathcote (surname)

Parliament of England
Preceded by Sir John Fleet; Sir William Ashurst; Thomas Papillon; Sir James Houblon	Member of Parliament for the City of London; 1701; With: Sir William Ashurst; Sir Robert Clayton; Sir William Withers	Succeeded by Sir William Ashurst; Sir Robert Clayton; Sir William Withers; Sir John Fleet
Preceded by Sir William Ashurst; Sir Robert Clayton; Sir William Withers; Sir John Fleet	Member of Parliament for the City of London; 1701–1707; With: Sir William Ashurst 1701–1702, 1705–1707; Sir Robert Clayton 1701–1702, 1705–1707; Sir Thomas Abney 1701–1702; Sir William Prichard 1702–1705; Sir John Fleet 1702–1705; Sir Francis Child 1702–1705; Samuel Shepheard 1705–1707	Succeeded by Parliament of Great Britain
Parliament of Great Britain
Preceded by Parliament of England	Member of Parliament for the City of London; 1707–1710; With: Sir Robert Clayton 1707; Samuel Shepheard 1707–1708; Sir William Ashurst 1707–1710; Sir William Withers 1707–1710; John Ward 1708–1710	Succeeded by Sir William Withers; Sir Richard Hoare; Sir George Newland; Sir John Cass
Preceded by Thomas Tonkin; Alexander Pendarves	Member of Parliament for Helston; 1715–1722; With: Sidney Godolphin	Succeeded by Sir Robert Raymond; Walter Carey
Preceded by Lord Harry Powlett; Paul Burrard	Member of Parliament for Lymington; 1722–1727; With: Paul Burrard	Succeeded by Lord Nassau Powlett; Anthony Morgan
Preceded by Lord Binning; Philip Cavendish	Member of Parliament for St Germans; 1727–1733; With: Sidney Godolphin 1727–1732; Richard Eliot 1733	Succeeded by Richard Eliot; Dudley Ryder
Government offices
Preceded by Sir Francis Eyles	Governor of the Bank of England; 1709–1711	Succeeded by Sir Nathaniel Gould
Preceded by Sir Thomas Scawen	Governor of the Bank of England; 1723–1725	Succeeded by William Thompson
Civic offices
Preceded by Sir Samuel Garrard, 4th Baronet	Lord Mayor of London; 1710–1711	Succeeded by Sir Robert Beachcroft
Baronetage of Great Britain
New creation	Baronet (of London); 1733	Succeeded by John Heathcote
