= William Withers =

Lord Mayor of London

Sir William Withers (c. 1654 – 31 January 1720) of Fulham, Middlesex, was an English linen draper and Tory politician who sat in the English and British House of Commons between 1701 and 1715. He was Lord Mayor of London from 1707 to 1708.

== Early life ==
Withers was the second son of William Withers, a linen-draper, of St. Mary-le-Bow, London, and his first wife Sarah Cornish, daughter of George Cornish. He was a descendant of Sir Thomas Wyther and was believed to be the first family member to spell the name Wyther as Withers. It is sometimes difficult to distinguish father and son in the record, and Withers may have been the common counsellor for Cheap from 1675 to 1680. In 1680, like his father, he became a freeman of the Fishmonger's Company. He married Margaret Hayes, daughter of Thomas Hayes of Chertsey Abbey, Surrey by licence dated 24 February 1682.

== Career ==
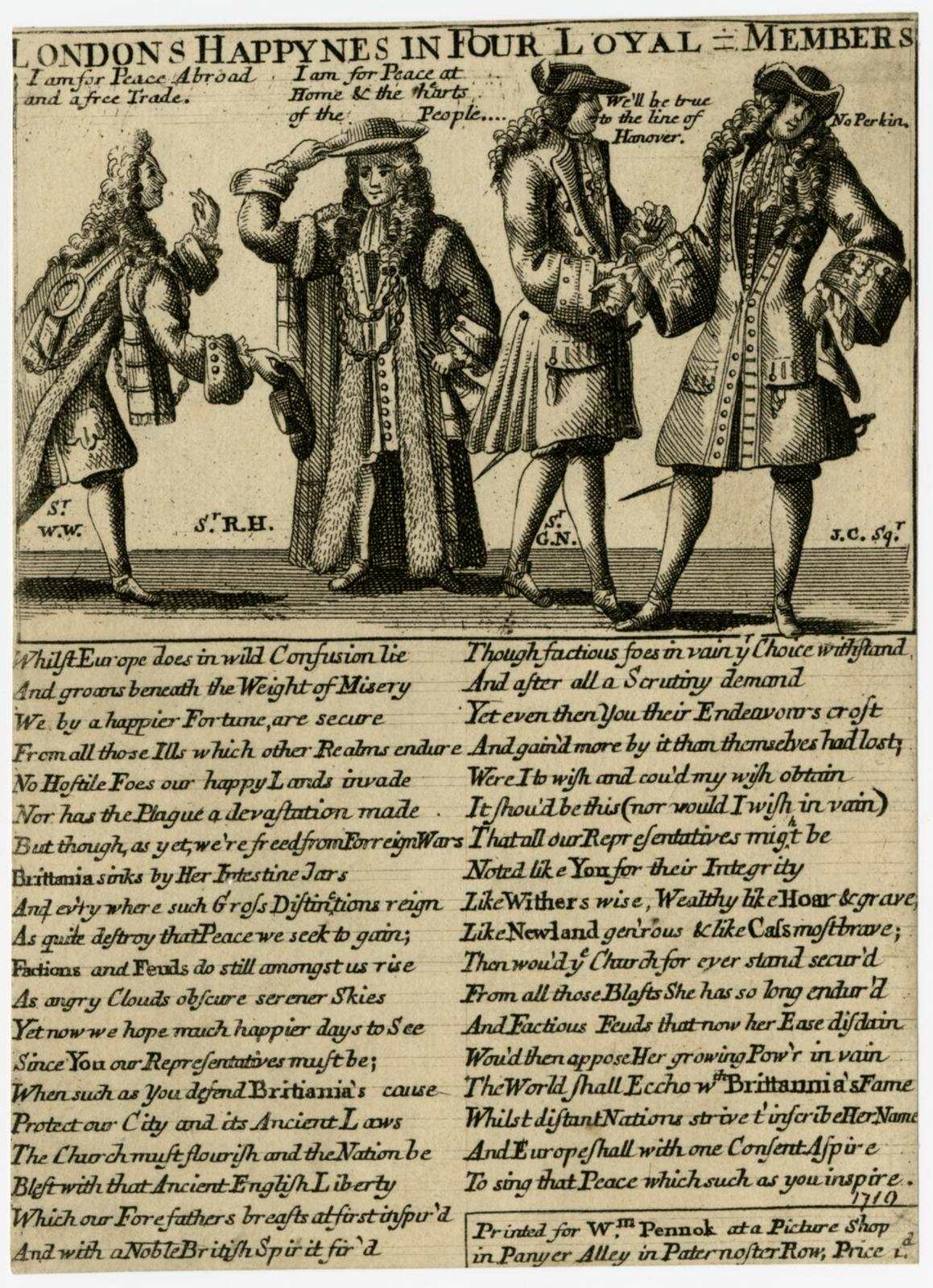
Broadside supporting the new Tory City of London members of parliament, Sir William Withers, Sir Richard Hoare, Sir George Newland, and (Sir) John Cass.

Withers was probably a Commissioner for taking subscriptions to land bank in 1696 and an Assistant of the Royal African Company from 1697 to 1698. In 1698, he became a Director of the New East India Company and was elected Alderman for Farringdon Within ward. He was knighted by William III on 20 October 1699 when he was a member of the City delegation which congratulated the King on his return from the Continent. He became Prime Warden of the Fishmonger's Company in 1700

At the first general election of 1701 Withers was returned as Member of Parliament for London. Although a Tory, he was prepared to stand with the Whigs on behalf of the New East India Company. He became Sheriff of London for the year 1701 to 1702, which meant that as returning officer, he could not stand for election at the second general election of 1701 or the 1702 English general election. At the 1705 English general election he stood for the City again, but came bottom of the poll. He became Colonel of the Yellow regiment of the City militia in 1705, and in 1706 became Governor of the Irish Society for life. He was runner up for the mayoralty for 1706, and was then chosen to serve as Lord Mayor for the year 1707 to 1708. In 1707 he lost his command in the Militia, but became a Sub-Governor of the Royal African Company. On the strength of being Mayor, he was elected again as MP for the City of London at a by-election on 16 December 1707, following the death of Sir Robert Clayton.

Withers was returned again for the City of London at the 1708 British general election. On stepping down as Mayor in 1708, he became President of the Bridewell and Bethlehem Hospitals. Also in 1708, he acquired a newly built house called Holcrofts, having a long avenue of elms in front, from Robert Limpany. He became a Director of the United East India Company from 1709 to 1710 and regained his regiment in 1710. He was returned for the City again at the 1710 British general election. He was Commissioner for building 50 new churches in 1711 and 1712. He was returned again at the 1713 British general election but was thrown out when the Whigs returned to power at the 1715 British general election. He was appointed Governor of St Thomas' Hospital by 1719.

== Later life and legacy ==
Withers died on 31 January 1720 and was buried at All Saints Church, Fulham. He and his wife had two children, William and Sarah.

Parliament of England
Preceded by Sir John Fleet; Sir William Ashurst; Thomas Papillon; Sir James Houblon	Member of Parliament for City of London; 1701; With: Sir William Ashurst; Sir Robert Clayton; Sir Gilbert Heathcote; Sir John Fleet	Succeeded by Sir William Ashurst; Sir Robert Clayton; Sir Gilbert Heathcote; Sir Thomas Abney
Parliament of Great Britain
Preceded by Sir Robert Clayton; Sir William Ashurst; Samuel Shepheard; Sir Gilbert Heathcote	Member of Parliament for City of London; 1707–1715; With: Sir William Ashurst 1707–1710; Samuel Shepheard 1707–1708; Sir Gilbert Heathcote 1707–1710; John Ward 1708–1710; Sir Richard Hoare 1710–15; Sir George Newland 1710–15; Sir John Cass 1710–15	Succeeded by Robert Heysham; Sir John Ward; Peter Godfrey; Sir Thomas Scawen
Civic offices
Preceded by Sir Robert Bedingfeld	Lord Mayor of London; 1707–1708	Succeeded by Sir Charles Duncombe
