= John Fleet =

John Fleet may refer to:

- John Faithfull Fleet (1847–1917), historian, epigraphist and linguist
- Sir John Fleet (Lord Mayor) (1648–1712), Member of Parliament and Sheriff for London
- John Fleet (MP), Member of Parliament for Weymouth and Melcombe Regis (UK Parliament constituency) in 1397
