= John Ward (banker) =

British merchant, banker and politician

Sir John Ward (c. 1650–1726), of Hookfield, Clay Hill, Epsom, Surrey and St Laurence Pountney, London, was a British merchant, banker and politician who sat in the House of Commons between 1701 and 1726. He was an original Governor of the Bank of England and served as Lord Mayor of London in 1718.

Ward was the second son of John Ward, commissioner of customs, of Tanshelf, near Pontefract, Yorkshire and his wife Elizabeth Vincent, daughter of Thomas Vincent of Barnbrough, Yorkshire. His uncle was Sir Patience Ward, Lord Mayor of London in 1680. He married Mary Bucknell, the daughter of Sir William Bucknall of Oxhey Place, Hertfordshire on 17 April 1684. In 1700 he acquired Hookfield Park on Clay Hill Epsom, with the help of his father in law.

Ward was one of the original directors of the Bank of England from 1694 to 1699, served as Deputy Governor from 1699 to 1701 and as Governor from 1701 to 1703. He then resumed his directorship from 1703 to his death. He was also a director of the East India Company from 1703 to 1707 and from 1709 to 1711.

Ward was returned unopposed as Member of Parliament for Bletchingley at the first general election of 1701, with the support of his friend Sir Robert Clayton. He was returned unopposed again at the second general election of 1701 and in the general elections of 1702 and 1705. At the 1708 British general election he was elected in a contest as MP for City of London. In 1709 he became Freeman of the Merchant Taylors’ Company and its master for the year 1709 to 1710. He was also elected a London alderman for Candlewick ward on 7 April 1709. He was unsuccessful in the general elections of 1710 and 1713. He was knighted on 25 September 1714.

Ward was elected again as MP for the City of London at the 1715 British general election. He was selected as Sheriff of London for the year 1715 to 1716 and was elected Lord Mayor of London for the year 1718 to 1719. He did not stand at the 1722 British general election but was returned as MP for Dunwich at a by-election on 7 December 1722.

Politically he was regarded as a Whig, but usually very independent of the government, and at one time as MP for the City of London was supported by the Tories and largely voted for their candidates. Towards the end of his life he had reconciled with the government and worked for their interests in the City.

Ward died in March 1726, leaving a son, John, and ten daughters.

== See also ==
- Chief Cashier of the Bank of England

Government offices
Preceded by Nathaniel Tench	Governor of the Bank of England; 1701–1703	Succeeded by Abraham Houblon
Parliament of England
Preceded by Hugh Hare; Sir Robert Clayton	Member of Parliament for Bletchingley; With: Sir Edward Gresham 1701-1702; John Evelyn 1702; Sir Robert Clayton 1702-1705; George Evelyn 1705-1708	Succeeded by George Evelyn; Thomas Onslow
Parliament of Great Britain
Preceded by Gilbert Heathcote; Samuel Shepheard; Sir William Ashurst; Sir William Withers	Member of Parliament for the City of London; 1708–1710; With: Gilbert Heathcote; Sir William Ashurst; Sir William Withers	Succeeded by Sir William Withers; Sir Richard Hoare; Sir George Newland; Sir John Cass
Preceded by Sir William Withers; Sir Richard Hoare; Sir George Newland; Sir John Cass	Member of Parliament for the City of London; 1715–1722; With: Robert Heysham; Peter Godfrey; Sir Thomas Scawen	Succeeded by Peter Godfrey; Richard Lockwood; Sir John Barnard; Francis Child
Preceded by Sir George Downing, 3rd Baronet; Edward Vernon	Member of Parliament for Dunwich; 1722–1726; With: Sir George Downing, 3rd Baronet	Succeeded by Sir George Downing, 3rd Baronet; John Sambrooke
Civic offices
Preceded by Sir William Lewen	Lord Mayor of London; 1718–1719	Succeeded by Sir George Thorold, 1st Baronet
