= Henry Ashurst (merchant) =

Henry Ashurst (c. 1614 – 1680), was a wealthy and benevolent merchant of London, noted for his gifts of money to pious or charitable purposes.

== Life ==
His father Henry was a justice of the peace in Lancashire; his mother was Cassandra Bradshaw of Bradshaw, near Bolton. One of his brothers, William, engaged in politics, becoming M.P. for Newton, Lancashire in 1641 and for the county in 1654 whilst his other brother John became a lieutenant-colonel in the civil war. All three brothers were Parliamentarians and Presbyterians. Their sister Mary became the wife of Dr. Theophilus Howorth of Manchester.

Henry Ashurst the son was apprenticed at the age of fifteen to a London draper; his prospects were advanced by a loan from the Rev. James Hiet, of Croston, Lancashire, and by his marriage with Judith Reresby. He became a successful merchant, entered the common council, and, though ejected in 1662, subsequently became an alderman. In 1667 he was living at Lauderdale House, but at the time of his death, which occurred in November 1680, he is described as of Hackney.

He had the intimate acquaintance of Henry Newcome, of Manchester, Richard Baxter, who preached his funeral sermon, Matthew and Philip Henry, and others; and the writings of all these divines abound in references to him.

== Charity ==
His charities to his Lancashire countrymen were extensive: he allowed needy ejected ministers in that county £100 per annum, and relieved the widows of ministers. He was interested in John Eliot's missionary efforts in North America, and Eliot termed him his worthy and true friend. Ashurst acted as treasurer for the Society for the Propagation of the Gospel, was a trustee of Boyle's Lectures, and was a patron of religious literature. Baxter describes him as 'the most exemplary person for eminent sobriety, self-denial, piety, and charity that London could glory of, as far as public observation, and fame, and his most intimate friends could testify.'

== Family ==
His son Henry, also a friend of Richard Baxter's, became a baronet; he was the builder of Waterstock. The second son, William, was knighted in 1689, and was Lord Mayor of London in 1693. Each brother received £20 by bequest of Robert Boyle.
