= Ladies Charity School =

English charity school for girls, c1680–1919

- Highgate, London; England

Information
- Other name: Ladies Hospital
- Type: Charity school
- Established: c. 1680
- Founder: William Blake (merchant)
- Closed: 1919

The Ladies Charity School in London, England, was originally founded in Highgate c1680 as a charity school for forty orphans by the merchant William Blake (d.1696). After his death, it was revived and extended in 1702, and after relocating across London, was taken over by the Church Army as a training school in 1919.

== Early history ==
The school was founded by the London merchant draper William Blake, who, after the death in 1650 of his wife Mary, was inspired by the writing of Bishop Lewis Bayly to provide for orphans. Blake's brother Francis was a wealthy landowner in Highgate and William had leased part of Arundul House from him.

William spent £5000, his entire wealth, on setting up the Ladies Charity School House (or Hospital). His vision was to house and educate forty orphans, boys and girls: ‘The boys to be taught the art of painting, gardening, casting accounts, and navigation, or put forth to some good handicraft trade, and to wear an uniform of blue lined with yellow. The girls to be taught to read, write, sew, starch, raise paste, and dress, that they might be fit for any good service’. He acquired Dorchester House, The Grove, Highgate, former home of the Marquess of Dorchester, to house the girls.

To try to maintain the school, Blake sold his Highgate home to Sir William Ashhurst, and houses at 1-6 South Grove (mortgaged from his brother), to Sir Francis Pemberton. He published a pious book ‘’Silver Drops’’ to appeal to noble ladies, but ultimately failed to secure lasting funding. Blake was imprisoned for debt 1685–1687, and died in 1696.

== Revival and expansion ==
The school was revived in 1702 by the Society for Promoting Christian Knowledge, expanding from the Ladies Hospital, to provide a Protestant education for orphans aged 9–11 years old. Supporters included Dr Johnson and Hester Thrale. By 1827, the school had moved to 37 King Street, Smithfield (present day Snow Hill) and by 1853 was operating at 30 John Street, Bloomsbury, near Bedford Row, with attendance of 51 Protestant girls aged 8–14.

In c1882, the school relocated from 22 Queen Square, Bloomsbury, to Powis House, 16 Powis Gardens, North Kensington, next door to All Saints Notting Hill. Its mission had changed from orphans to the daughters of respectable but impoverished families, who paid towards their education: girls were trained for domestic service and left school at age 15. In 1919, the Powis House premises were taken over by the Church Army, who used it as a training home for girls aged 14 to 18.
