= George Dashwood (1680–1758) =

English politician

Member of Parliament for Stockbridge
- In office 1710–1713 Serving with The Earl of Barrymore
- Preceded by: Sir Edward Lawrence; Sir John Hawles
- Succeeded by: Sir Richard Steele; Thomas Brodrick

Personal details
- Born: 7 March 1680 London
- Died: 11 January 1758 (aged 77)
- Party: Tory
- Spouse: Katherine Bristow (m. 1712)
- Relations: John Smith (uncle); Sir Francis Dashwood, 1st Baronet (uncle)
- Children: Samuel Dashwood
- Parent(s): Samuel Dashwood; Anne Smith
- Education: Oriel College, Oxford

George Dashwood (bp 7 March 1680 – 10/11 January 1758) was an English politician who served as a Tory MP for Stockbridge.

== Early life ==
Dashwood was born into a prosperous mercantile household and baptized on 7 March 1680 in London. He was the fourth, but eldest surviving, son of Sir Samuel Dashwood and the former Anne Smith. Among his siblings were Elizabeth Dashwood (who married Andrew Archer, MP for Warwickshire) Sophia Dashwood (who married Francis Lewis, MP for East Retford), Henrietta Dashwood (who married Sir Thomas Sebright, 4th Baronet), and Sarah Dashwood (who married Richard Crawley, Registrar of the Admiralty). His father was an MP for the City of London before becoming Lord Mayor of London in 1702.

His paternal grandparents were Francis Dashwood, a London merchant, and Alice (née Sleigh) Dashwood. Among his paternal family was uncle Sir Francis Dashwood, 1st Baronet, and aunt, Sarah Dashwood (who married Fulke Greville, 5th Baron Brooke). His maternal grandfather was John Smith of Tedworth. His uncle was John Smith, who served as Chancellor of the Exchequer.

== Career ==
The death of his father in 1705 gave him financial independence, particularly after he had received £15,000 from his uncle, Sir Francis Dashwood, for the sale of his share of the manor of West Wycombe, Buckinghamshire. He graduated from Oriel College, Oxford in 1735 and went on the Grand Tour, meeting up with his kinsman, James Dashwood.

Dashwood was allied with the Tories as evidenced when he was elected a "nephew" of the Board of Brothers, the Duke of Beaufort's drinking club, in February 1710. In September of that year, Beaufort was a key figure in Dashwood's campaign at Stockbridge, a "notoriously venal borough which was accustomed to electing outsiders. Dashwood was duly returned unopposed alongside the Earl of Barrymore", a fellow member of the Board of Brothers. Dashwood did not make any significant contribution to Commons in his only Parliament. While initially he maintained the party line, he was "listed as one of the 'worthy patriots' who in the first session sought to discover the mismanagements of the previous administration." On 25 January 1712, the day after the vote of censure against the Duke of Marlborough, he was one of the eight Members to receive the thanks of the Board of Brothers for their "good attendance and service" in the House. The following month he was identified as a member of the October Club, but before the Parliament was over he had broken with his party, choosing to vote against the French commerce bill on 18 June 1713. "Only a few weeks before, he had presented at court an address on behalf of his constituents which gave thanks for the end of the war, but his apostasy in that division may have cost him his seat, since he did not appear at the succeeding Stockbridge election."

After 1713, it appears that Dashwood did not pursue any further political activity. He acquired an estate at Heveningham, Suffolk in 1719, and, in 1732, became High Sheriff of Suffolk. In 1738, fortune was further bolstered by his brother Thomas' "bequest of 'a considerable estate'", although he sold all of his Suffolk holdings in 1745. By the time of his death in 1758, he had settled in the fashionable area of St George Hanover Square.

== Personal life ==
By 1712, he was married to Katherine Bristow (1690–1779), a daughter of Robert Bristow, MP for Winchelsea. Among her sibling were Robert Bristow and John Bristow, both of whom were MPs. Together, they were the parents of:

- Samuel Dashwood (1717–1794), who married Anne Bateman, the only child of James Bateman, MP for Carlisle (and son of banker Sir James Bateman), and Ann (née Chaplin) Bateman (daughter of Sir Robert Chaplin, 1st Baronet), in 1744. They lived at Well Vale Hall.

Dashwood died on 10/11 January 1758 at his home in St George Hanover Square. His widow served as a lady of the bedchamber to Queen Charlotte.

=== Descendants ===
Through his only son Samuel, he was a grandfather of Ann Catherine Dashwood (wife of political reformer John Cartwright), Diana Dashwood (wife of Charles Vere Dashwood, a descendant of Sir Robert Dashwood, 1st Baronet), Samuel Bateman Dashwood, Sophia Dashwood, George Bateman Dashwood, William Bateman Dashwood, and Francis Bateman Dashwood (wife of Teresa March). (Note: Their children were: Harriet Susan Dashwood (1783–1815), the wife of James Harris, 2nd Earl of Malmesbury, and Francis John Bateman Dashwood, who married Hon. Georgiana Anne Anderson-Pelham (a daughter of Charles Anderson-Pelham, 1st Baron Yarborough), and inherited Well Vale Hall.)

Parliament of Great Britain
Preceded by Sir Edward Lawrence; Sir John Hawles	Member of Parliament for Stockbridge; 1710–1713; With: The Earl of Barrymore	Succeeded by Sir Richard Steele; Thomas Brodrick
