= Richard Hoare (banker) =

English banker (1648–1719)

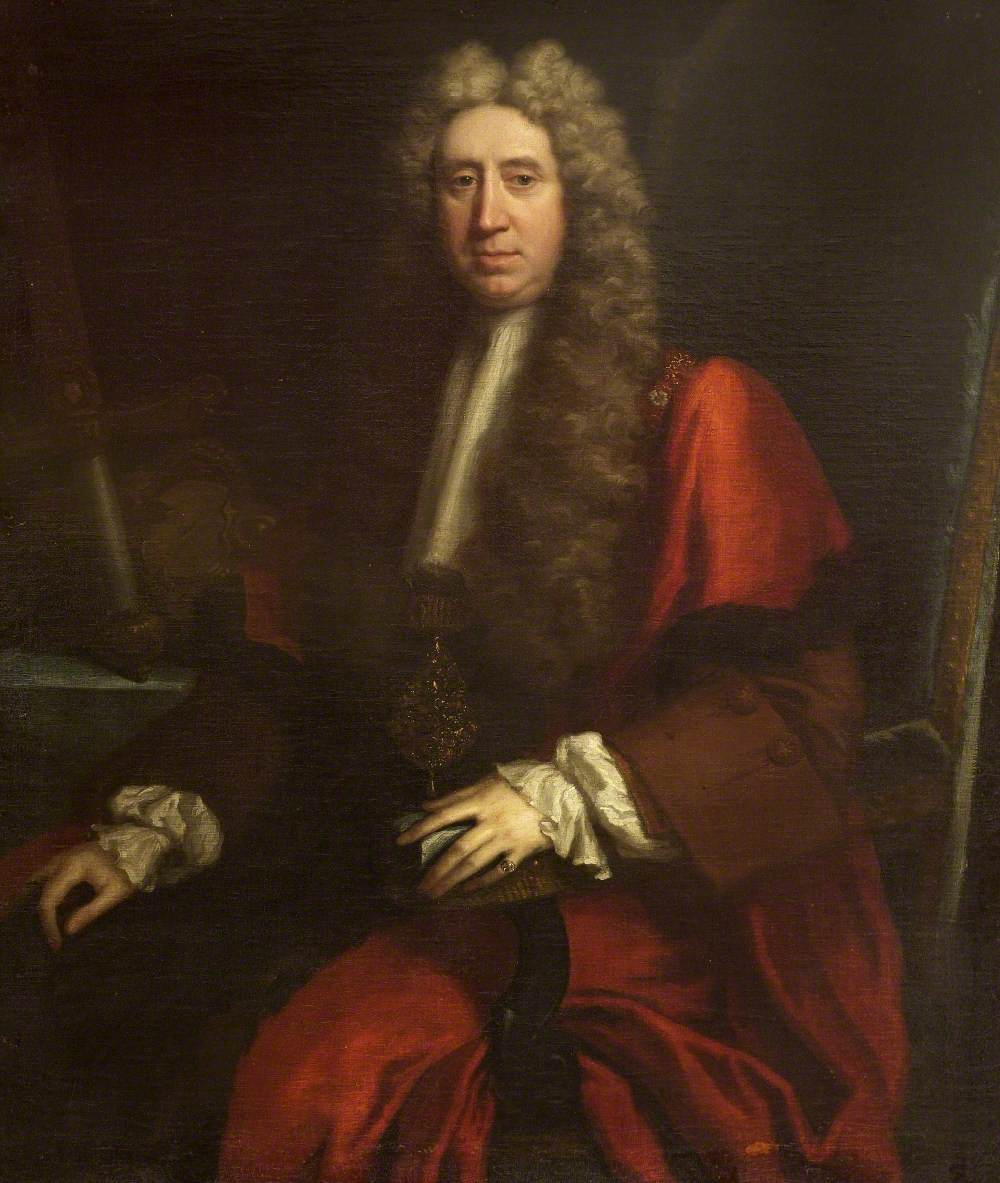
c. 1712 portrait of Hoare by Jonathan Richardson

Sir Richard Hoare (1648 – 6 January 1719) was an English banker who founded C. Hoare & Co., the oldest extant bank in Britain.

== Business career ==
Raised near Smithfield Market in London, only son of horse-dealer Henry Hoare (died 1699) and Cicely (died 1679), Richard Hoare began his working life apprenticed to the goldsmith Richard Moore from 9 June 1665 for seven years. He was granted the Freedom of the Worshipful Company of Goldsmiths on 5 July 1672. This date marks the foundation of C. Hoare & Co as a goldsmith's business at the sign of the Golden Bottle in Cheapside, London.

== Political career ==
Hoare, a Tory, stood for election as Sheriff of London in June 1702 but was unsuccessful. He was knighted by Queen Anne in October 1702. He attained the office of alderman in September 1703. At the general election of May 1705, he first stood for parliament in the City of London constituency, but could only manage fifth place, as the City’s Tories were soundly defeated. He also failed in the City election of 1708, finishing seventh, as the Whigs once again dominated the poll.

Contesting the mayoral election of September 1710 he unsuccessfully challenged the Whig leader (Sir) Gilbert Heathcote but was appointed Sheriff of London instead and was elected to Parliament in the same year, finishing second in the poll. He finally became Lord Mayor of London in September 1712 having also contested the election in 1711. The City election of 1713 saw Hoare returned to Parliament having again finished second but he did not stand in 1715. He subsequently withdrew from public life in 1718 due to ill-health. Hoare died at Hendon on 6 January 1719.

A monument to his memory stands in the church of St Dunstan-in-the-West and was designed and created by Thomas Stayner.

== Family ==
Hoare married Susanna Austen; they had 17 children (one of whom was Henry Hoare I).

Parliament of Great Britain
Preceded by Sir William Withers; Sir William Ashurst; Gilbert Heathcote; John Ward	Member of Parliament of Great Britain for London (City); 1710 - 1715; Elected with: Sir William Withers; Sir George Newland; SirJohn Cass	Succeeded by Robert Heysham; Sir John Ward; Peter Godfrey; Sir Thomas Scawen
Civic offices
Preceded by Sir Robert Beachcroft	Lord Mayor of London; 1712–1713	Succeeded by Sir Samuel Stanier
