= Robert Beachcroft =

London cloth merchant and Lord Mayor of London (1650–1721)

Sir Robert Beachcroft
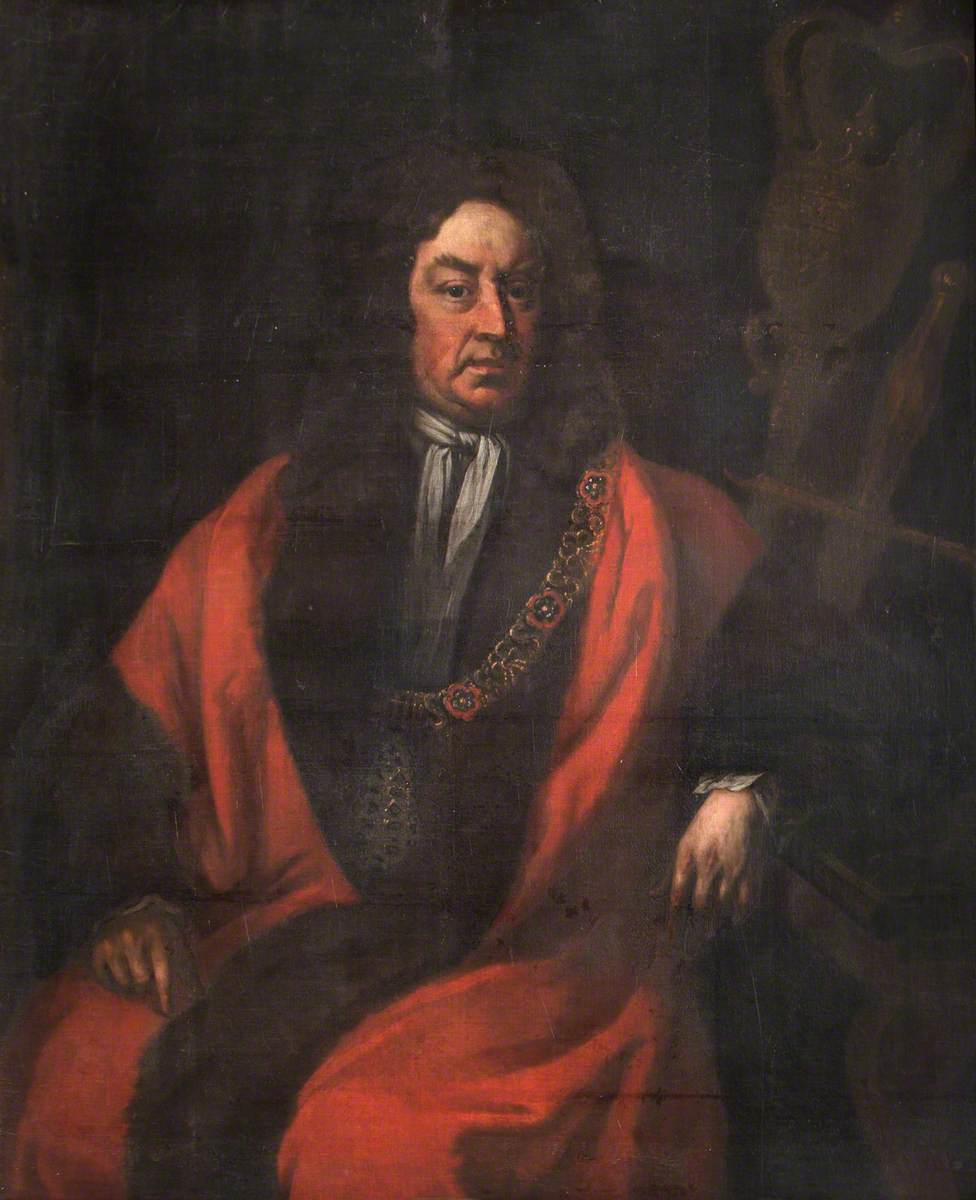

Lord Mayor of London
- In office 1711–1712
- Monarch: Anne
- Preceded by: Sir Gilbert Heathcote
- Succeeded by: Sir Richard Hoare

Sheriff of the City of London
- In office 1700–1701 Serving with Sir Henry Furnese

Alderman of the Lime Street Ward
- In office 18 March 1703 – 27 May 1721

Personal details
- Born: c. 1650 Derby, England
- Died: May 27, 1721 (aged 71) Leyton, Essex, England
- Spouse: Margaret Perry (m. 1706)
- Occupation: Cloth merchant

Sir Robert Beachcroft (1650–1721) was a London cloth merchant who was Lord Mayor of London in 1711.

Beachcroft was the son of Daniel Beachcroft, a yeoman farmer of Derby, and his wife Mary Fox and was baptised at All Saints Church, Derby on 28 April 1650. In September 1668 he was apprenticed to Thomas Palfreyman, a clothworker in London. He became a Freeman of the Clothworkers Company on 5 October 1675. He set up in business and at some time was a Blackwell Hall factor, dealing in cloth from provincial manufacturers. Having acquired considerable wealth, he purchased More Hall, the former home of Sir Thomas More.

Beachcroft was a Common Councillor for the Tower from 1699 to 1701 and was Master of the Clothworkers and Sheriff of London for the year 1700 to 1701. He was knighted on 24 October 1700. He was elected Alderman for Lime Street on 18 March 1703. From 1707 to 1710, he was a Colonel of the Green Regiment of the City militia. He was a Director of the South Sea Company from 1711 to 1712 and was Lord Mayor from 1711 to 1712. From 1714 he was living at Lea Hall Leyton.

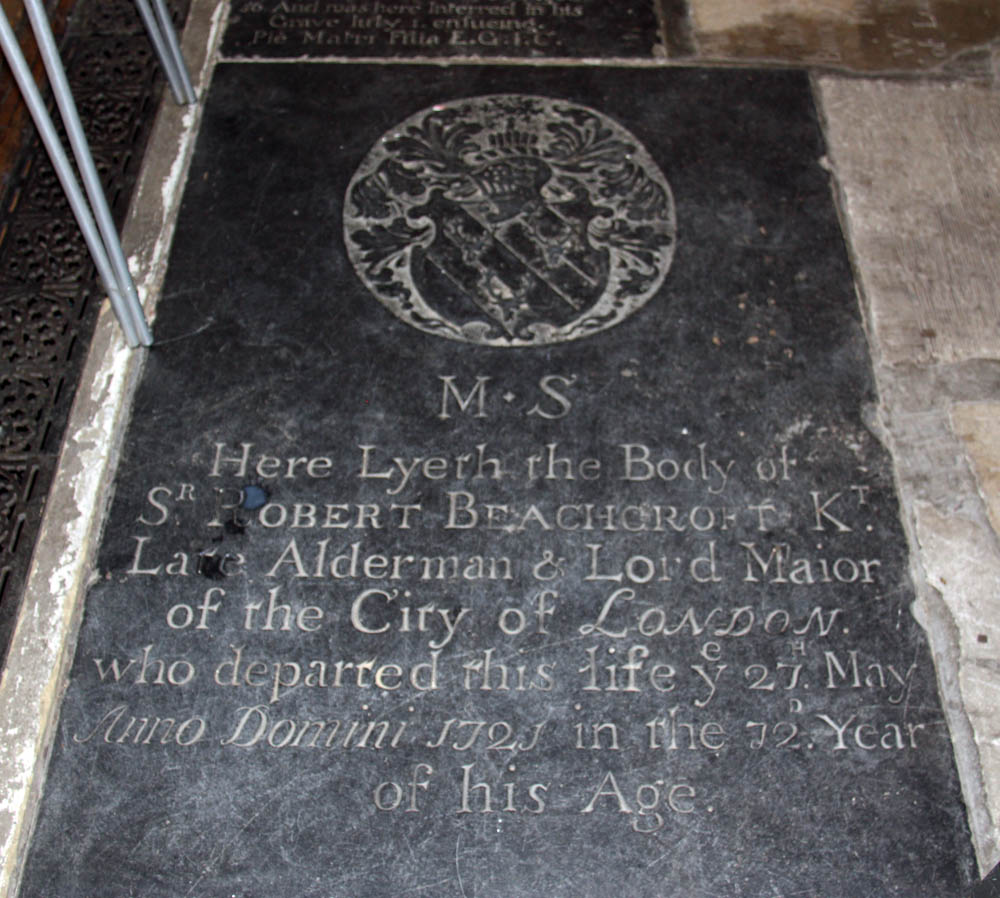

Beachcroft married Margaret Perry, a widow, on 17 January 1706. He was a liberal benefactor to Christ's-church and St. Thomas's hospitals. Beachcroft died on 27 May 1721 aged 72 and was buried at St Mary's Church Leyton on 7 June. He had no children and his estate went to a nephew. Margaret Lady Beachcroft died on 15 December 1727.

Civic offices
Preceded by Sir Gilbert Heathcote, 1st Baronet	Lord Mayor of London; 1711-1712	Succeeded by Sir Richard Hoare
