= Marie Maillard =

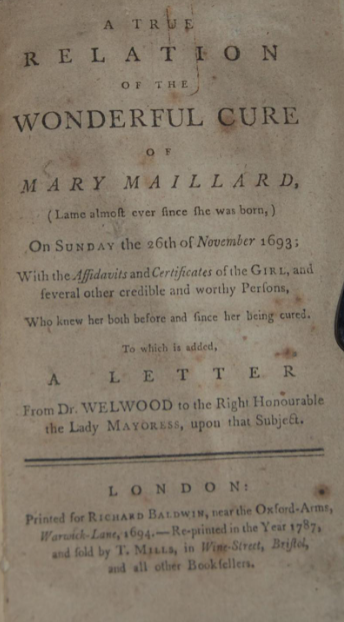
- 1694 account of her miracle
- Born: 25 September 1680; Saintonge
- Died: 23 November 1731 (aged 51); Bishopsgate
- Other name: Marie Briel
- Known for: cured of lameness by "a miracle"
- Spouse: Henry Briel

Marie Maillard became Marie Briel aka Mary Maillard (25 September 1680 – 23 November 1731) was a French born huguenot who was the reported beneficiary of miraculous healing in London.

== Life ==
Maillard was born in Cognac, Saintonge, France. Her parents, John Maillard and Charlotte du Dognon, were Huguenots. When she was one year old, she contracted a lameless in her left leg, that seemed to be caused by a cavity between where her hip and thigh met. Maillard's father feared this was caused by playfully throwing her in the air. When she was about nine, her family moved to the Huguenot area of London to escape persecution in France. When she was thirteen, she was sent to live with another refugee girl named Renée de Laulan. On 26 November 1693, Maillard was returning home when a group of boys mocked her, calling her names and throwing dirt at her. She returned home crying and later that night read her Bible when she found she was cured. In her joy, Maillard began dancing around the room. Reports of her cure attracted attention. She was called to see the Lord Mayor, and Queen Mary sent four surgeons to examine the case. In addition, the Bishops of London, Worcester, and Salisbury, took an interest. Some saw this miracle as a divine sign.

The physician James Wellwood wrote a letter to Elizabeth Ashurst, who was the lady mayoress, concerning her case, and it was published in London in 1694. Jane Shaw notes that Wellwood took an indecisive approach. This was an enlightened time, and the illogical existence of miracles raised questions. Wellwood noted that the atheists and enthusiasts could decide their approach easily, but he found it difficult to take a side on this happening that was "above the road of nature".

Over the next couple of years, there were other remarkable cures reported of young girls, and each case involved reading the Bible which was published.

Maillard went on to marry the Reverend Henry Briel, who was a Huguenot minister. In 1730, the accounts of her cure were reprinted, and this time Maillard gave her own account, and her permission was given for the publication under the title An exact relation of the wonderful cure of Mary Maillard. Maillard lived and died in Bishopsgate in 1731. Over fifty years later, the case continued to attract interest. In 1787, Wellwood's letter and other accounts summarising the case were republished.
