= John Moore (Lord Mayor) =

English politician (1620–1702)

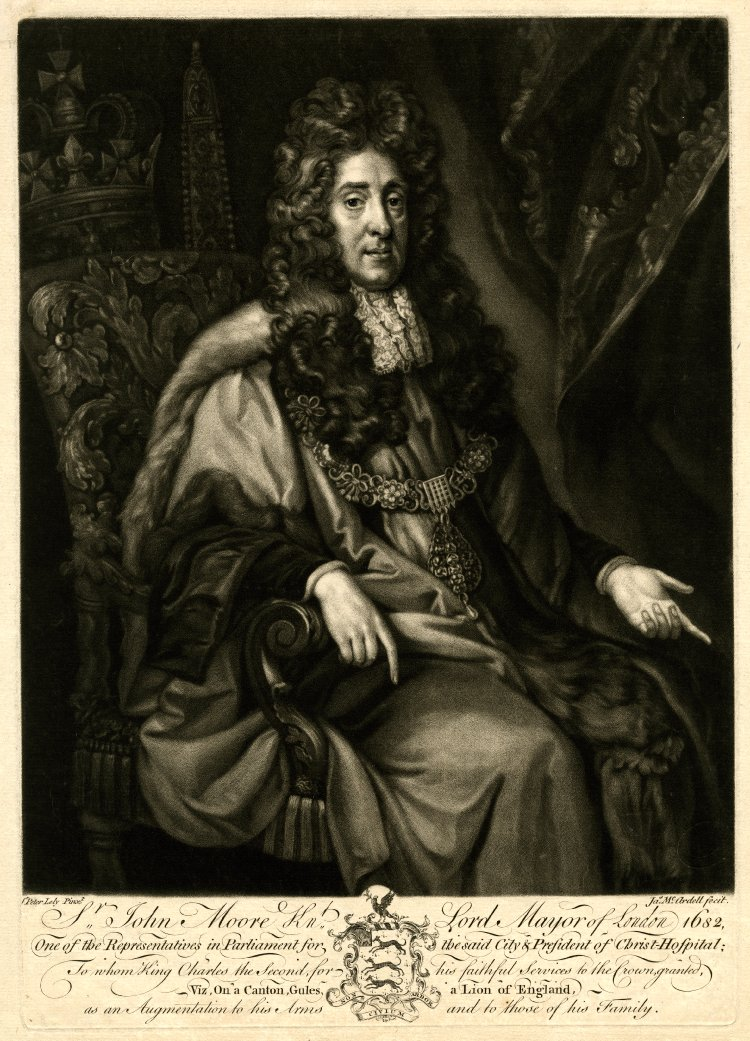
- Sir John Moore, Lord Mayor of London, mezzotint by James Macardell after portrait by Sir Peter Lely.

Lord Mayor of London
- In office 1681–1682
- Preceded by: Sir Patience Ward
- Succeeded by: William Prichard

Personal details
- Born: 11 June 1620
- Died: 2 June 1702 (aged 81)

Sir John Moore (11 June 1620 – 2 June 1702) was an English politician. He was the Member of Parliament for the City of London from 15 May 1685 to 9 January 1687, and Lord Mayor of London from 1681–82. He also invested in the slave trade.

== Biography ==
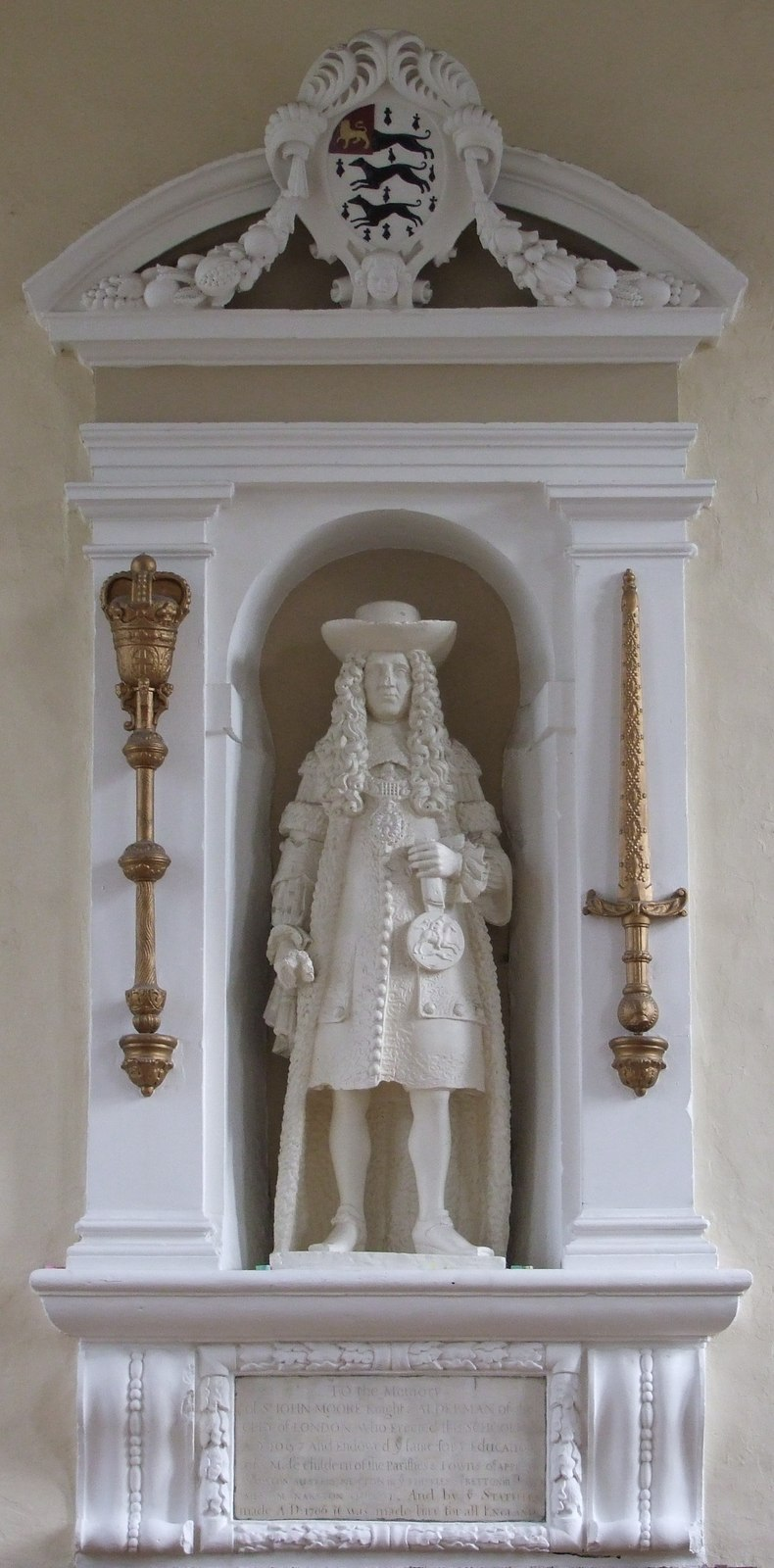
Statue of Sir John Moore at Sir John Moore Church of England Primary School, Appleby Magna, Leicestershire.

He was born in Snarestone Lodge near Snarestone, Leicestershire, on 11 June 1620, the son of Charles Moore Esq., a local landowner and owner of Appleby Hall, Appleby Magna, and Cecily Yates. Snarestone Lodge was the Lodge house to his mother's family estate: Snarestone Hall (now Demolished)

His elder brother, also called Charles, was expected to inherit the family estates. So as the second son, John Moore was expected to make his own way in the world. He, and subsequent generations of younger sons, went to London to make a living as merchants. John Moore was active in the lead business, then in trade with East India, and became Master of the Grocer's Company.

Originally he was a non-conformist, but after entering the Church of England he was able to take a seat as alderman for Walbrook. He was knighted in 1672, and elected Sheriff of London that same year. He was a representative of the Court party in the reign of Charles II, and active in supporting its influence in the City of London. He was elected as one of the representatives from the city to the 1685 Parliament.

=== Links to the slave trade ===
Moore was a Member of Court of Assistants (essentially the board of directors) of the slave-trading Royal African Company, 1687–9 and 1700–1702, and was an investor in the Guinea trade. He was a shareholder in the East India Company, which was involved in the Indian Ocean slave trade.

=== Legacy ===
He died aged 81, on 2 June 1702, leaving his estates, worth £80,000 (£6,247,200 today), to his two nephews.

Moore contributed large sums to the erection of schools at Christ's Hospital, and founded a free grammar school in Appleby Magna.

Politically, he was a Tory and, upon becoming Lord Mayor, was celebrated in song as the man who would keep the commoners in their place:

May Moore ne'er cease to stand up for the Crown
'Gainst the Presumptous Rabble of the Town

A statue of Moore by Grinling Gibbons was erected at Christ's Hospital in London, but was moved in 1902 to Christ's Hospitals School, Horsham, Sussex.

Political offices
| Preceded by Sir Patience Ward | Lord Mayor of London; 1680–1681 | Succeeded by William Prichard |
| Preceded by Thomas Pilkington | MP for City of London; 1685–1687 | Succeeded by William Prichard |
