= Patience Ward =

English merchant and politician (1629–1696)

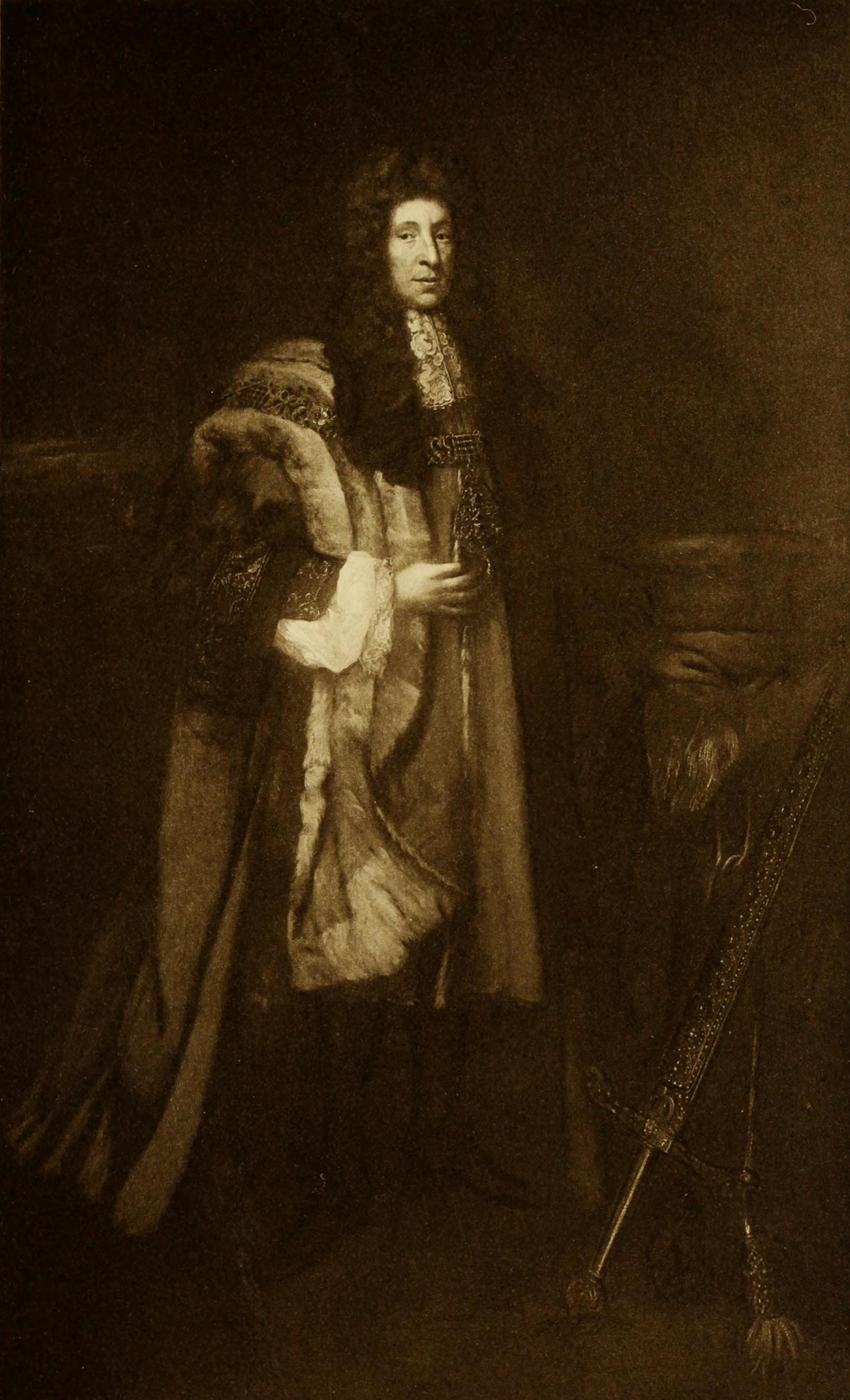
- Engraving of a portrait of Ward

Lord Mayor of London
- In office 1680–1681
- Preceded by: Robert Clayton
- Succeeded by: John Moore

Personal details
- Born: 7 December 1629
- Died: 10 July 1696 (aged 66)
- Spouse: Elizabeth Hobson
- Parents: Thomas Ward (father); Elizabeth Ward (mother)

Sir Patience Ward (7 December 1629 – 10 July 1696) was an English merchant and Whig politician. He was elected Lord Mayor of London in 1680, a period when the City of London was in conflict with the Crown.

== Early life ==
He was the son of Thomas and Elizabeth Ward of Tanshelf, near Pontefract and was born there on 7 December 1629; he received the name of Patience from his father, who was disappointed at not having a daughter. He lost his father at the age of five, and was brought up by his mother for the ministry. He was sent to university in 1643, under the care of a brother-in-law, but then turned his attention to commerce.

== In business ==
On 10 June 1646, he was apprenticed for eight years to Launcelot Tolson, merchant-taylor and merchant-adventurer, of St Helen's, Bishopsgate, with whom he lived until his marriage. He later set up in business for himself in St. Lawrence Pountney Lane, where he occupied a portion of the ancient mansion variously known as 'Manor of the Rose' and Poultney's Inn, the house having formerly belonged to Sir John Pulteney (Poultney): the house is shown in Ogilby and Morgan's 'Map of London,' 1677, and in the plan of Walbrook and Dowgate wards in Noorthouck's 'New History of London' (p. 612). On completing his apprenticeship he became a freeman of the Merchant Taylors' Company, but there was a difficulty about his taking up his livery; in the end he paid a fine. He became master of the company in 1671.

== In politics ==
He was elected sheriff on midsummer day 1670, and on 18 October in the same year became alderman for the ward of Farringdon Within. At the mayoralty banquet on 29 October 1675, which the king honoured with his presence, Ward, with other aldermen, was knighted. He was elected lord mayor on Michaelmas day 1680, and entered into office on 29 October following. In his election speech he maintained Protestant principles. The pageant was arranged by Thomas Jordan the city poet; it was of great magnificence, and was provided at the cost of the Merchant Taylors' Company. Ward's sympathies, like those of his colleague Sir Humphrey Edwin, were strongly opposed to the high-church party, and probably inclined to the dissenters.

On 28 March 1681, the king dissolved his third short parliament, and on 13 May the common council, by a narrow majority of fourteen, agreed to address the king, praying him to cause a parliament to meet, and continue to sit until due provision were made for the security of his majesty's person and his people. Ward, who sided with the opposition, had the unthankful task of presenting this address, and the first attempt to do so failed, the deputation being told to meet the king at Hampton Court on 19 May. When that day arrived the civic deputation were summarily dismissed. Ward, however, received a vote of thanks from the grand jury at the Old Bailey for the part he had taken in presenting the address. He received further thanks from the common hall on 24 June, and was desired to present another address to the king, assuring his majesty that the late address truly reflected the feeling of that assembly. This address, presented on 7 July, was received poorly, Ward and his colleagues being again told to mind their own business.

The extreme Protestantism of the city, probably directed by Ward, had early in his mayoralty led to an additional inscription being engraved on the Monument to the Great Fire of London stating that the fire of London had been caused by the papists; and a further inscription to the same effect was ordered to be placed on the house in Pudding Lane where the fire began. Thomas Ward in his England's Reformation (1710, canto iv. p. 100), speaking of Titus Oates and the fabricated Popish Plot, wrote also against Sir Patience.

The court party succeeded this year in turning their opponents out of the city lieutenancy, and the lord mayor lost his commission as a colonel of a regiment of the trained bands. At the close of his mayoralty Ward was succeeded by Sir John Moore, a partisan of the court, after the unusual resort to a poll. One of the final incidents in Ward's mayoralty was the resolution of the corporation to undertake the business of fire insurance on behalf of the citizens.

== In exile ==
Ward became a Fellow of the Royal Society in 1682. On 19 May 1683, he was tried for perjury in connection with the action brought by James, Duke of York against Sir Thomas Pilkington for scandalum magnatum. He was accused of having sworn that to the best of his remembrance he did not hear the words spoken which were said to be criminal. After much conflicting evidence he was found guilty and fled to Holland. During his exile abroad he was in constant communication with Thomas Papillon, the sheriff-elect of 1682, who had also been driven into exile. A portion of their correspondence is printed by Mr. A. F. W. Papillon in his 'Memoirs of Thomas Papillon' (1887, pp. 336–347).

On 10 February 1688, Ward pleaded his majesty's pardon by attorney for his conviction of perjury.

== Under William and Mary ==
The accession of William III restored him to full favour and honour. He was elected one of the four city members to serve in the convention summoned to meet on 22 January 1689. At the next election, in February 1690, Ward and the other three whig candidates lost their seats. He was appointed colonel of the blue regiment of the trained bands on 31 March 1689, and on 19 April a commissioner for managing the customs. He lost his colonelcy in 1690, the church party being once more in a majority, but was re-elected on the ascendency of the whigs in 1691. On 24 March 1695–6, he was compelled through illness to give up his office of commissioner of customs, but recovered sufficiently to resume his duties on 9 April.

Ward died on 10 July 1696, and was buried in the south corner of the chancel of St Mary Abchurch, where a mural monument to his memory was set up. His arms were azure, a cross patonce or. There was a full-length portrait of Ward in his mayoral robes at Merchant Taylors' Hall, and a small watercolour copy in the Guildhall Library.

== Family ==
Ward married, on 8 June 1653, Elizabeth, daughter of William Hobson of Hackney. His wife predeceased him during his exile on 24 December 1685, and was buried in the 'great church at Amsterdam.' There was no issue of the marriage, but Sir Patience left his manor of Hooton Pagnell to his grand-nephew, Patience Ward, in whose family it still remains. His nephew, Sir John Ward, son of his brother, Sir Thomas Ward of Tanshelf, was Lord Mayor in 1714, and ancestor of the Wards of Westerham in Kent.

== Notes ==
Civic offices
Preceded by Robert Clayton	Lord Mayor of London; 1680–1681	Succeeded by John Moore

Attribution

This article incorporates text from a publication now in the public domain: "Ward, Patience". Dictionary of National Biography. London: Smith, Elder & Co. 1885–1900.
