= Samuel Dashwood =

English merchant and politician

The Right Honourable Sir Samuel Dashwood JP

Lord Mayor of London
- In office 1702–1703
- Preceded by: Sir William Gore
- Succeeded by: Sir John Parsons

Member of Parliament for the City of London
- In office 1685–1687
- Preceded by: Sir William Prichard
- Succeeded by: Sir William Turner
- In office 1690–1695
- Preceded by: Sir William Prichard
- Succeeded by: Sir Peter Rich

Personal details
- Born: c. 1643
- Died: 12 August 1705 (aged 61–62) London, England
- Party: Tory
- Spouse: Anne Smith (after 1670)
- Relations: Sir Francis Dashwood, 1st Baronet (brother); Sir Robert Dashwood, 1st Baronet (cousin)
- Children: 14, including George
- Parent(s): Francis Dashwood; Alice Sleigh

Sir Samuel Dashwood JP (c. 1643 – 12 August 1705) was an English merchant and Tory politician. He was Lord Mayor of London in 1702.

== Early life ==
The son of Francis Dashwood, a London merchant, by his wife Alice Sleigh, he was a brother of Sir Francis Dashwood, 1st Baronet, and cousin of Sir Robert Dashwood, 1st Baronet. His sister Sarah married Fulke Greville, 5th Baron Brooke in 1665.

== Career ==
Dashwood was elected Sheriff of London, and was also knighted, in 1683, and was a Member of Parliament for the City of London in 1685 and 1690.

Dashwood's father was a farmer of the excise, and he himself became a commissioner of excise in 1683. An alderman in 1687, he was removed by James II for refusing to countenance the suspension of the Corporation Act.

In 1702, a colonel in the Lieutenancy of the City, Dashwood was made a Justice of the Peace, based on his willingness to use judicial powers. In that year Dashwood was Lord Mayor of London, and entertained Queen Anne at the London Guildhall as part of the lavish show that he organised. It was authored by Elkanah Settle, and marked the final pageant of the old tradition.

== Personal life ==
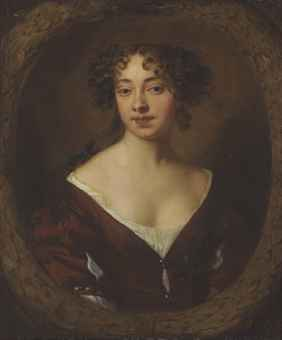
Portrait of his wife, Anne Dashwood (née Smith), by Peter Lely

On 17 May 1670, Dashwood was married to Anne Smith, a daughter of John Smith of Tedworth. Her brother was politician John Smith, who served as Chancellor of the Exchequer. Together, Samuel and Anne were the parents of four sons and ten daughters, including:

- Elizabeth Dashwood, who married Andrew Archer, MP for Warwickshire, in 1702,
- George Dashwood (1680–1758), MP for Stockbridge who married Katherine Bristow, a daughter of Robert Bristow, MP for Winchelsea.
- Jane Dashwood, who married William Phillipps, son of Sir Ambrose Phillipps of Garendon.
- Sophia Dashwood, who married Francis Lewis, MP for East Retford.
- Henrietta Dashwood (1687–1771), who married Sir Thomas Sebright, 4th Baronet.
- Sarah Dashwood, who married Richard Crawley, Registrar of the Admiralty.
- Annabella Dashwood (d. 1771), who married Thomas Medley, of Buxted

Samuel's heir was George, the fourth son but the oldest who survived his father. His commercial success had enabled him to buy properties in Buckinghamshire and Surrey, but he continued to live in the capital until his death on 12 August 1705. He was buried at St Botolph-without-Bishopsgate. He left an estate reportedly valued at £100,000, which was shared among his surviving two sons and five daughters.

=== Descendants ===
Through his daughter Elizabeth, he was a grandfather of Thomas Archer, 1st Baron Archer (1695–1768), and Henry Archer (1700–1768), who both served as MPs.

Through his daughter Jane, he was a grandfather of Ambrose Phillipps (c. 1707–1737), MP for Leicestershire.

Through his daughter Anne, he was a grandfather of Sir Thomas Sebright, 5th Baronet (1723–1761), who died unmarried and was succeeded by his brother, Lt.-Gen. Sir John Sebright, 6th Baronet (1725–1794).

Through his daughter Sarah, he was a grandfather of John Crawley (1703–1767), MP for Marlborough.

Through his daughter Annabella, he was a grandfather of George Medley (1720–1796), MP for East Grinstead and Seaford.

Civic offices
Preceded by Sir William Gore	Lord Mayor of London; 1702–1703	Succeeded by Sir John Parsons
