= Thomas Pilkington =

English merchant and politician

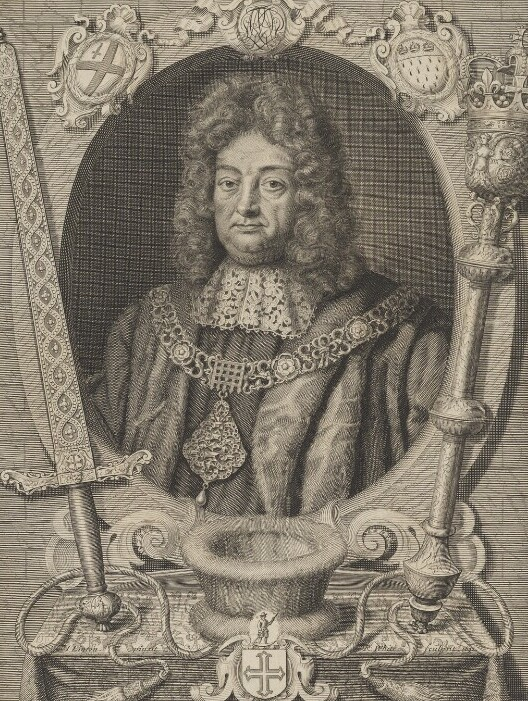
c. 1691 engraving of Pilkington by Robert White

Sir Thomas Pilkington (died 1 December 1691) was an English merchant and Whig politician who served as the Lord Mayor of London in 1689.

== Early life ==
He was son of Thomas Pilkington of Northampton, by his second wife, Anne Mercer, and grandson of John Pilkington of Oakham in Rutland. He came to London at an early age, and became a successful merchant. He was a member of the Skinners' Company, and served the office of master there in 1677, 1681, and 1682.

== Representative of the City of London ==
Pilkington was an early Whig politician of the Exclusion Crisis, and was returned as one of the four City of London members to the short Parliament which met on 6 March 1679. In the course of the debate Pilkington expressed a wish that James, Duke of York might return from abroad, so that he might be impeached for high treason. He was again returned to the parliament of 1680. On 14 December in the same year he was elected alderman of the ward of Farringdon Without.

In June 1681 the citizens obtained a victory over the court interest, on the election of Pilkington and Samuel Shute as sheriffs, after a hotly contested poll, by a large majority over the court candidates, Ralph Box and Humphrey Nicholson. The election gave offence to the king; but Pilkington entertained at his house the Duke of Monmouth, Anthony Ashley Cooper, 1st Earl of Shaftesbury, Arthur Capell, 1st Earl of Essex, and other leaders of the whig party. Meanwhile, the lord mayor, Sir John Moore, who led the court faction in the city, gave similar entertainments to its chiefs at his house in Fleet Street. Roger North claimed in his Examen that, on the trial of the Earl of Shaftesbury for high treason (24 November 1681), Pilkington showed great partiality in returning the grand jury, and was reprimanded by the judges.

In March 1682 Pilkington himself was tried at the Southwark assizes on a slight charge of libel, when the jury brought in a verdict of £800 damages for the plaintiff. Pilkington appealed on the ground of excessive damages, and eventually the case came before the House of Lords, by whom the judgment was confirmed 3 June 1689.

At the election of new sheriffs on midsummer day 1682, Pilkington and his fellow-sheriff Shute, who presided, defeated, by an exceptional exercise of their authority, the Lord Mayor Sir John Moore's efforts to secure the election of the court candidates, Dudley North and Ralph Box. The Lord Mayor on the following day attended with a deputation to inform the king that the sheriffs had behaved riotously. A privy council was summoned, the sheriffs were ordered to appear, and were accused of riotous conduct. Their trial, together with that of Ford Grey, 3rd Baron Grey of Warke, Alderman Henry Cornish, Sir Thomas Player, Slingsby Bethel, and others, took place on 16 February 1683. They were found guilty on 8 May, and were fined on 26 June for various sums amounting to £4,100, Pilkington's fine being £500. (This judgment was later reversed by the House of Lords on a writ of error on 17 July 1689.)

Pilkington's shrievalty closed on 28 September 1682, when the outgoing sheriffs declined to entertain, according to custom, the lord mayor at dinner. The alleged riots fomented by Pilkington and Shute were made in part the ground for suspending the city's charter by the quo warranto of 1683.

On laying down his office, further difficulties confronted Pilkington. James, Duke of York had already brought against him an action of scandalum magnatum. He was charged with refusing to accompany a deputation of the corporation on 10 April 1682 to pay respect to the Duke on his return from Scotland, and with saying, in the presence of Aldermen Sir Henry Tulse and Sir William Hooker, that the Duke had burned the city, and was then coming to cut the citizens' throats. Damages were laid by the duke at £100,000. The cause was tried on 24 November 1682 in Hertfordshire, and the jury decided against Pilkington for the damages claimed. Pilkington thereupon surrendered to his bail, was committed to prison, and resigned the office of alderman, to which Sheriff North succeeded. After an imprisonment of nearly four years he was released by the king's order towards the end of June 1686.

On the flight of his old enemy, then King James II, and the arrival of the Prince of Orange in 1688, Pilkington enjoyed the royal favour. He was elected alderman of Vintry ward on 26 February 1689, and was restored to his former place and precedence in the court of aldermen. He was also returned as one of the city representatives in parliament. On the sudden death of Sir John Chapman, Lord Mayor, on 20 March 1689, Pilkington was elected for the remainder of the year. On 10 April 1689 he was knighted by the king; on Michaelmas day he was elected Lord Mayor for the next year; and at his installation banquet entertained the king and queen William and Mary, with George and Anne, the Prince and Princess of Denmark. The pageant was written by Matthew Taubman, the city poet.

The act which reversed the judgment in quo warranto (14 May 1690) directed that a Lord Mayor and the principal city officers should be elected on 26 May, and should continue in office until the date at which the tenure of the office customarily determined in the following year. Accordingly, Pilkington and Sir Jonathan Raymond, a tory, were returned by the livery to the court of aldermen, who for the third time elected Pilkington Lord Mayor. At the beginning of December 1690 the common council complained in a petition to the House of Commons that the lord mayor and court of aldermen had encroached upon their privileges. The matter was contested in parliament, and after heated discussions a motion for the adjournment of the debate was carried on 11 December by a majority of 197 against 184.

== Death ==
Pilkington did not long survive his third mayoralty, dying on 1 December 1691. His town residence was in Bush Lane, Scott's Yard, Cannon Street (London Directory, 1677). A portrait of Pilkington is preserved at Skinners' Hall, and is reproduced in Wadmore's 'History of the Skinners' Company.' There is a contemporary engraving (1691) by Robert White, from a painting by Linton, and another by Robert Dunkarton, representing him in puritan costume.

== Family ==
Pilkington married Hannah Bromwich of London, by whom he had two sons.
