= William Turner (London MP) =

English Sheriff, Lord Mayor and M.P. of London

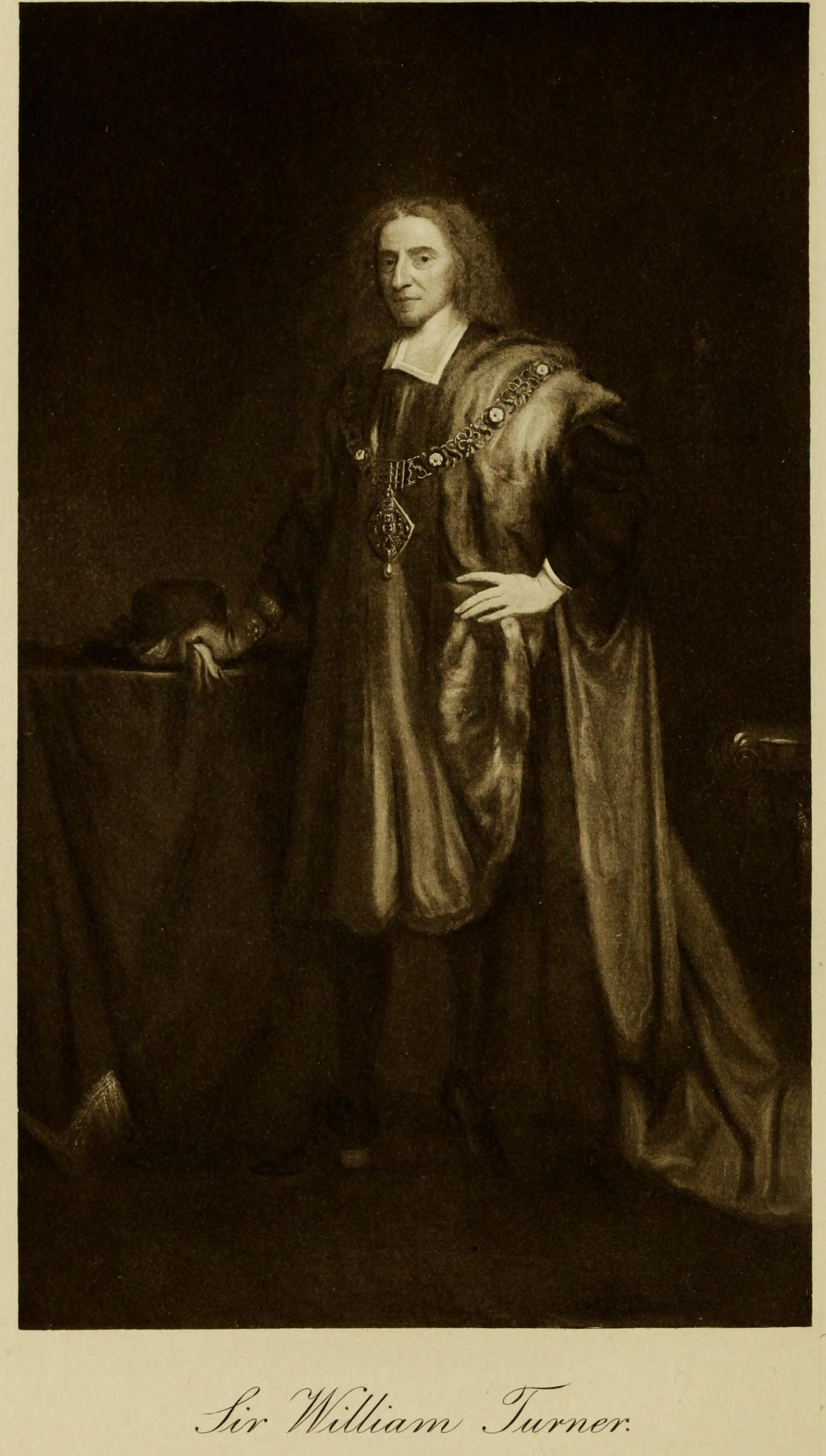
Sir William Turner

Sir William Turner (12 September 1615 – 9 February 1693) was an English Sheriff, Lord Mayor and M.P. of London.

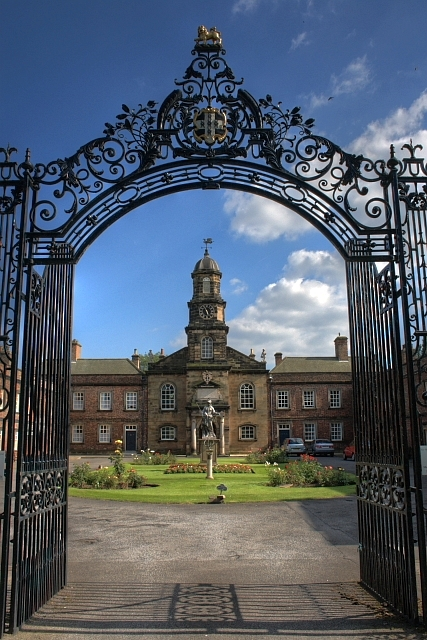
Sir William Turner's Hospital

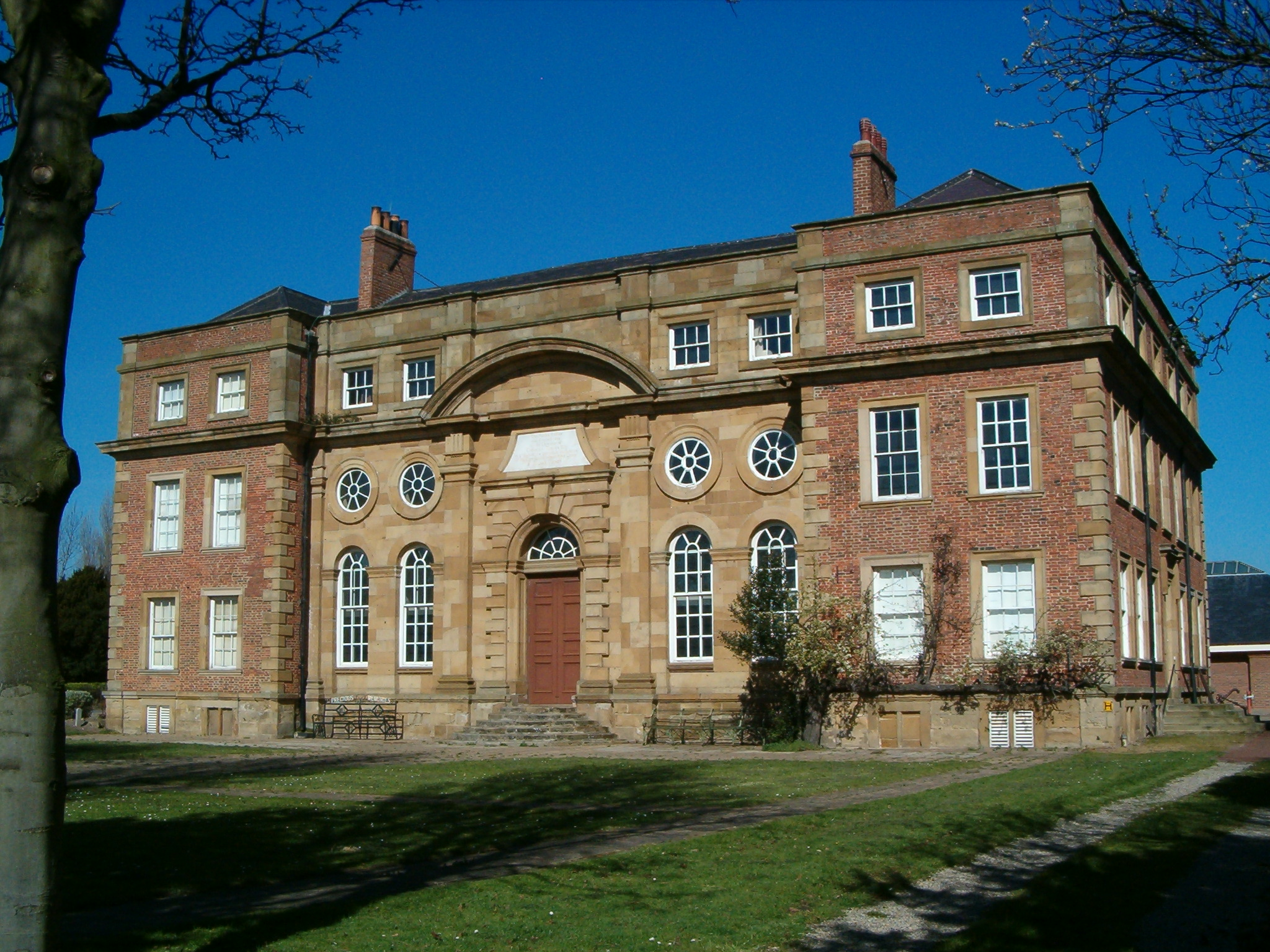
Kirkleatham Free School (now Kirkleatham Old Hall Museum)

He was born in Guisborough, the third son of John Turner. In 1623 his father bought the Kirkleatham Estate and built Kirkleatham Hall.

He moved to London and became a prosperous woollen-draper and Master of the Merchant Taylors' Company in 1661 (and again in 1684). He served as an Alderman of the City of London in 1660 and again from 1662 to 1687. He was elected a Sheriff of London for 1662–63 and Lord Mayor of London for 1668–69. He was knighted by Charles II in 1662 in recognition of his public work.

He served as the president of the Bethlehem and Bridewell Hospitals from 1669 until his death. He was a director of the East India Company for several years (1670–1, 1684–5, 1687–8, 1690–1).

He devoted much of his fortune to establishing a hospital in his home village of Kirkleatham in 1676, known as Sir William Turner's Hospital (or Almshouses) and now an independent retirement home. After being largely rebuilt in 1742 it has been occupied ever since. The attached chapel contains his death mask.

At the age of 75 he was elected as Member of Parliament for the City of London in 1690, sitting until his death.

He died unmarried in 1693. He bequeathed a substantial amount of money to his great nephew, Cholmley Turner, M.P. for Yorkshire, to establish a Free School, which now serves as the local museum.

== Controversy ==
A broadsheet satire was published in 1693 -- Good Sir W— Knock. THE WHORES Lamentation For the Death of Sir W.T. -- as a mock 'lamentation' on the death of Sir William Turner, in his role as president of Bridewell Hospital, which was a combination of petty court, house of correction, and apprenticeship institution for the City of London. The satire focuses on Sir William's role in judging and punishing 'whores' and other people (mostly women) with whipping, if they were deemed to have violated morality laws. The title refers to the process of whipping, which would stop when the president or presiding officer, acting as magistrate, would 'knock' his hammer on his desk. Those being whipped could often be heard pleading for the 'knock'. Such practices were standard at Bridewell since its founding. The authors of the broadsheet Good Sir W— Knock. ... were criticizing (through satire) the hypocrisy of the institution of justice for immorality (primarily prostitution) because it fell heaviest on the lower classes, while leaving the upper classes untouched. This message of "indignation" was expressed in the last paragraph:

Here let one Tear of Indignation fall,
Remembrance, how thou swell'st the Woman's Gall;
Remembrance, that a wale'st our hideous Chorus,
By representing our sad Scenes before us:
Sad Scenes, which such full vent for Griefs allow,
Till, Justice, we could turn as blind as Thou.
Oh Bridewell, what a Shame thy Walls Reproaches?
Poor Whores are Whip'd, whilst Rich Ones Ride in Coaches.
