= John Fleet (Lord Mayor) =

English merchant and MP

Sir John Fleet (1648 – 6 July 1712) was an English merchant who served as Lord Mayor, Sheriff and MP for London.

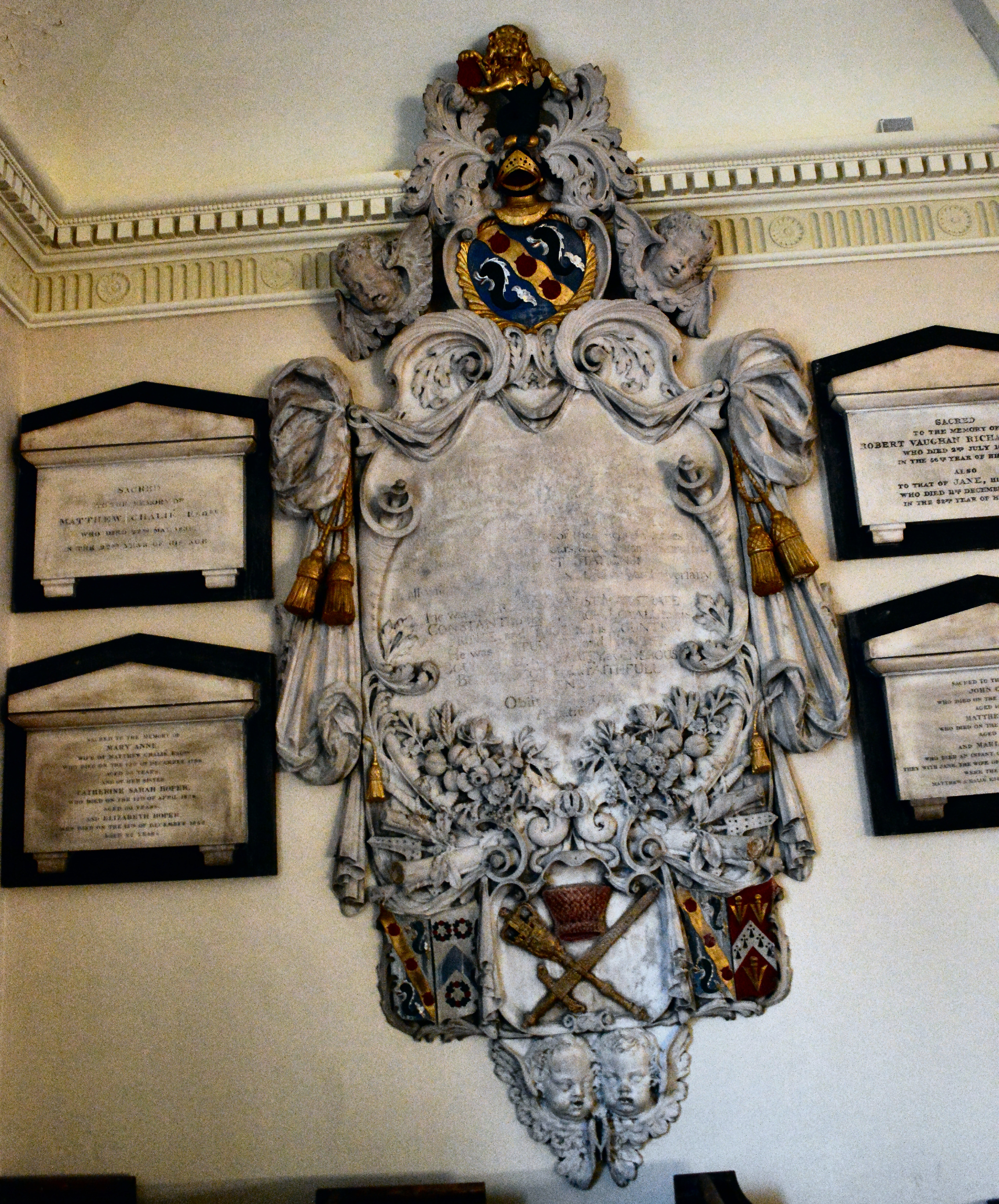
St. Mary's Church, Battersea

He was born the son of innkeeper Richard Fleet of Bourton, Buckinghamshire and entered the London cooping trade, progressing later to setting himself up as a sugar merchant. In 1689 he was elected Master of the Coopers' company, in 1693 Master of the Grocers' company and in 1688 an alderman of the City of London. He was elected Sheriff of London for the year 1688-89 and in 1692 elected Lord Mayor of London. He was knighted in 1688.

In 1693, he entered politics as the Member of Parliament for the City of London (until 1700) and was then returned again for the same seat in 1701 and 1702 (until 1705).

He died in 1712 and was buried at St Mary's Church, Battersea, London. He had married twice: firstly Elizabeth Arnold of St. Andrew, Holborn, Middlesex and secondly the widow of Thomas Newcombe, the royal printer, with whom he had three sons (one surviving) and four daughters.
