= William Prichard (politician) =

English merchant and politician

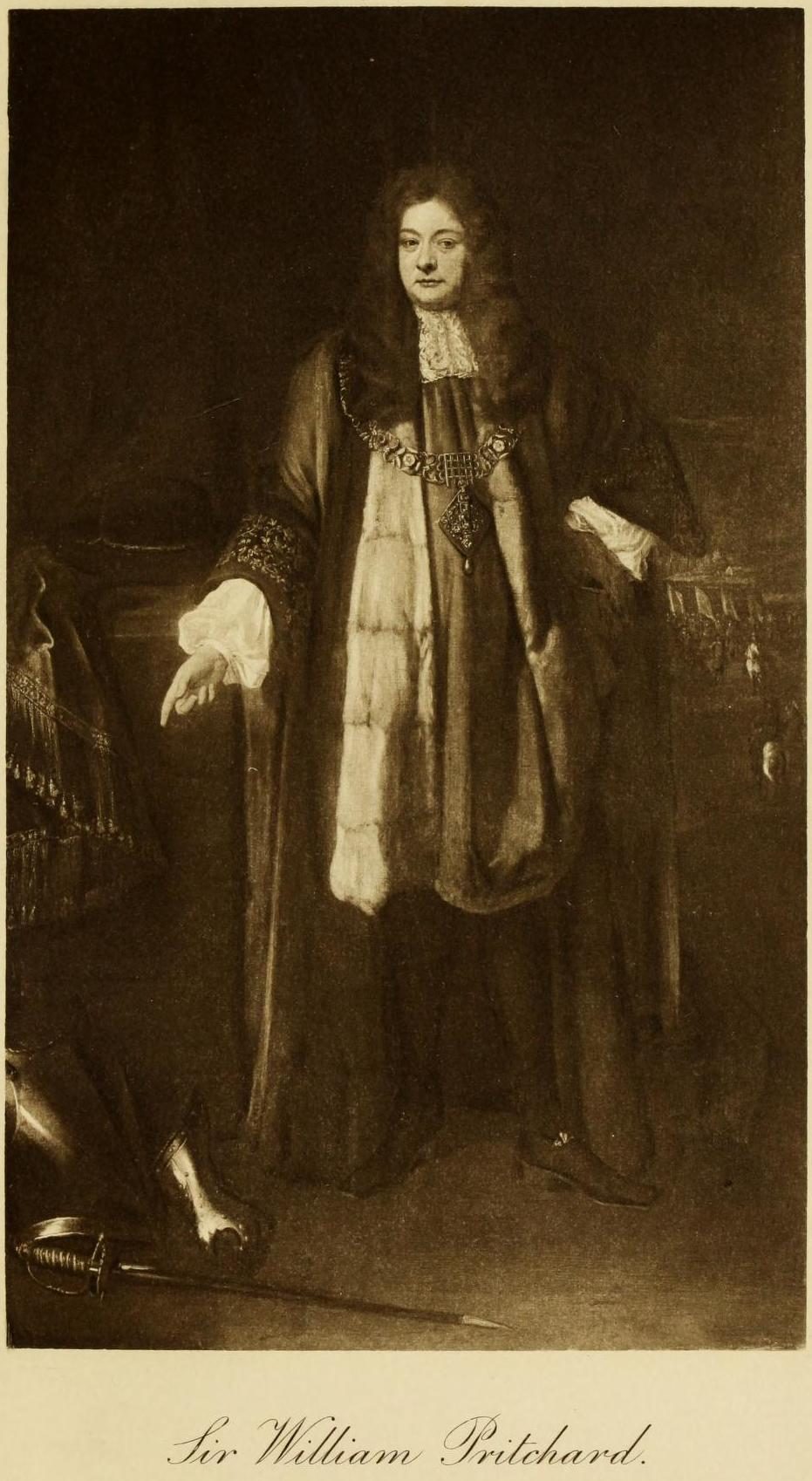
- Sir William Pritchard

Lord Mayor of London
- In office 1682–1683
- Preceded by: John Moore
- Succeeded by: Henry Tulse

Personal details
- Born: 1632
- Died: 1705 (aged 72–73)
- Spouse: Sarah Coke
- Children: 4; 3 sons and 1 daughter
- Parents: Francis Prichard of Southwark (father); Mary Eggleston (mother)

Sir William Pritchard or Prichard (1632?–1705) was an English merchant, slave trader and politician, Lord Mayor of London in 1682.

== Early life ==
Born about 1632, was the second son of Francis Prichard of Southwark, and his wife, Mary Eggleston. He is described as merchant taylor and alderman of Broad Street.

== Local politician and mayor ==
In 1672 Prichard was Sheriff of London, and he was knighted on 23 October in that year. On 29 September 1682 he went to the poll as court candidate for the mayoralty, and on 4 October the recorder declared him third on the list, below Sir Thomas Gold and Alderman Henry Cornish, both Whigs. But a scrutiny of the poll gave him the first place. On the 25th he was declared elected by the court of aldermen, and on the 28th was sworn in at the Guildhall. Prichard's election was celebrated as a great triumph for the court party, in loyal ballads and congratulatory poems. One of these "new loyal songs and catches" was set to music by Henry Purcell.

In office as mayor, Prichard carried on the policy of his predecessor, John Moore (Lord Mayor). He refused to admit to their offices the recently elected whig sheriffs, Thomas Papillon and John Dubois, whose election he had assisted Moore in setting aside. When, in February 1684, proceedings were taken against him by the Whigs, he refused to appear or give bail, and on 24 April was arrested by the sheriff's officers at Grocers' Hall; he was detained in custody for six hours. The arrest caused a furore and the corporation was forced to disclaim any part in it by an order in common council on 22 May. Prichard retaliated by an action for false and malicious arrest against Papillon (Dubois being now dead). The case was tried before George Jeffreys at the Guildhall on 6 November 1684, the law-officers of the crown appearing for the plaintiff, and Serjeant John Maynard for the defendant. Jeffreys summed up strongly in favour of Prichard, who was awarded £10,000. damages. Papillon fled the country to escape payment. Prichard declared his willingness to release him from the effects of the judgment, with the king's assent; this was long refused by James II, but was ultimately granted in 1688, when, on 7 August, Sir William gave a full release to Papillon at Garraway's coffee-house, drinking his former foe's health .

Meanwhile, Prichard had lost favour at court. In August 1687 he, with other aldermen, was displaced for opposing the king's moves for liberty of conscience. He appears to have been restored later; but in October 1688 he refused to act as intermediary mayor.

== Member of Parliament ==
On 15 May 1685 and in March 1690 Prichard was returned as one of the Members of Parliament for the City of London. After the Glorious Revolution Prichard continued active as Tory and churchman. In June 1690 he made an unsuccessful attempt to keep the Whig Sir John Pilkington out of the mayoralty; and in October 1698 and January 1701 he was an unsuccessful parliamentary candidate for the City; but he was returned at the head of the poll on 18 August 1702.

== Slave trader ==
Prichard was an executive of the Royal African Company, the major English slave trading company. It is probable that this activity contributed significantly to his wealth.

== Death and legacy ==
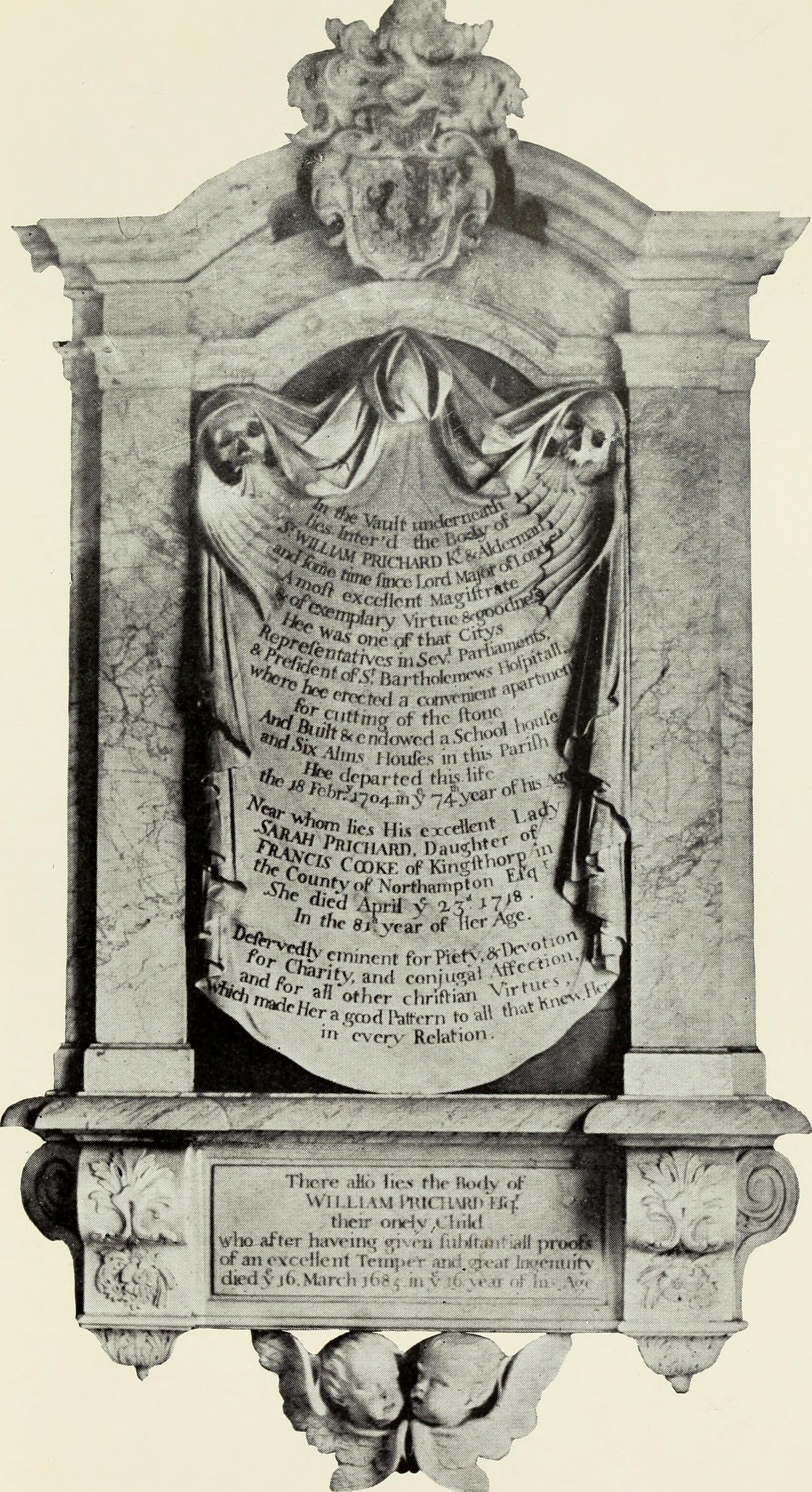
Memorial

Prichard died at his city residence in Heydon Yard, Minories, on 20 February 1705. His body was conveyed from his house at Highgate to Great Linford in Buckinghamshire, where it was buried on 1 March in a vault under the north aisle. An inscription on a marble slab recorded that Prichard was president of St. Bartholomew's Hospital, and that he erected there "a convenient apartment for cutting the stone". In Great Linford itself, the manor of which he had acquired in 1683 from the family of Richard Napier, Prichard founded and endowed an almshouse and school-buildings, and his widow increased his benefaction. Prichard's portrait was at Merchant Taylors' Hall.

== Family ==
By his wife, Sarah Coke of Kingsthorp, Northamptonshire, he had three sons and a daughter. She also was buried at Great Linford on 6 May 1718. In accordance with Prichard's will, the Buckinghamshire estates passed to Richard Uthwart and Daniel King, his nephews.
