= Appleyard =

Appleyard is an English surname. Notable people with the surname include:

- Bill Appleyard (1878–1958), English footballer
- Bob Appleyard (1924–2015), cricketer
- Bryan Appleyard, journalist and author
- David Appleyard, Reader in the Languages of the Horn of Africa at the School of Oriental and African Studies at the University of London
- Donald Appleyard, (1928–1982), Professor of Urban Design at the University of California
- E. T. S. Appleyard, (1904–1939), British physicist
- Francis Appleyard, English cricketer
- Fred Appleyard, British landscape artist
- Fred Appleyard (footballer) (1909–1995), English footballer
- Major Frederick Ernest Appleyard, British Army commander
- Major John Geoffrey Appleyard, British Special Air Service officer
- George Appleyard, English footballer
- Gertrude Appleyard, British archer
- Ian Appleyard, British alpine skier, rally driver and ornithologist
- José Luis Appleyard, Paraguayan poet
- John Appleyard, English cricketer
- John Wormald Appleyard (1831–1894) English woodcarver and sculptor
- Sir Leonard Appleyard (1938–2020), British diplomat
- Mark Appleyard, Canadian skateboarder
- Sir Matthew Appleyard (c. 1607–1670), MP for Hedon 1661–70
- Matthew Appleyard (died 1700) (c. 1660–1700), MP for Hedon 1689–95
- Peter Appleyard, Canadian jazz vibraphonist
- Rob Appleyard, Welsh rugby union player
- Robin Appleyard, 125cc Grand Prix motorcycle racer (1983–96)
- William Appleyard (MP) (died 1419), MP and first Mayor of Norwich
- William Appleyard (rugby league), rugby league player

== See also ==
- Appleyard (Greencastle, Indiana), a historic district near Greencastle, Indiana
- Silver Appleyard Duck, a breed of domestic duck
- The Appleyards, a British television soap opera for children
