= Matthew Appleyard =

Matthew Appleyard or Mathew Appleyard may refer to:

- Matthew Appleyard (died 1670) (c. 1607–1670), MP for Hedon 1661–70
- Matthew Appleyard (died 1700) (c. 1660–1700), MP for Hedon 1689–95

== See also ==
- Appleyard
