= Hildyard baronets =

Extinct baronetcy in the Baronetage of England

- Escutcheon of the Hildyard baronets of Patrington
- Creation date: 1660
- Status: extinct
- Extinction date: 1814
- Seat: Winestead Hall
- Motto: πλέον ήμισυ παντός, the half is better than the whole

The Hildyard Baronetcy, of Patrington in the County of York, was a title in the Baronetage of England. It was created on 25 June 1660 for Robert Hilyard, of Patrington and Winestead. The ancient Hildyard family is thought to have been of Saxon origin. Robert Hildyard served as Gentleman of the Bedchamber to King Charles I of England and was a major-general in the King's army during the English Civil War. He took part in the Battle of Marston Moor. He was raised to a baronetcy by Charles II following the Restoration of the Monarchy. He was succeeded by his grandson Sir Robert Hildyard, 2nd Baronet, a Member of Parliament for Hedon. He was succeeded by his nephew, the third Baronet, who was Member of Parliament for Great Bedwyn. The latter's son, the fourth Baronet, was High Sheriff of Yorkshire in 1783. On his death in 1814 the baronetcy became extinct.

== History ==
The Hildyard family was a land owning family from Yorkshire, England. Winestead was among their primary estates. The earliest member of the family was Robert Hildyard of Normanby, who was living in 1109. Sir Robert Hildyard, son of Sir Christopher and Elizabeth (Welby) Hildyard, was created baronet, and was the ancestor of the Hildyard baronets.

== Hildyard baronets, of Patrington (1660) ==
- Sir Robert Hildyard, 1st Baronet (1612–1685)
- Sir Robert Hildyard, 2nd Baronet (1670–1729) (grandson)
- Sir Robert Hildyard, 3rd Baronet (1716–1781) (nephew)
- Sir Robert D’Arcy Hildyard, 4th Baronet (1743–1814) (son)

== Extended family ==
Anne Catherine Whyte, the niece of Sir Robert D'Arcy Hildyard, 4th and last Baronet, inherited the Hildyard family's estates based around Winestead Hall, East Riding of Yorkshire. Her husband, Col. Thomas Blackborne Thoroton-Hildyard (1788–1830, né Thoroton), then assumed for him and their descendants (including the eldest one Thomas Blackborne Thoroton-Hildyard) the surname Hildyard in addition to Thoroton in 1815.

An ancient branch of Hildyard family, descending from the 1st Baronet's elder brother, Henry Hildyard (1610–1674) is extant.
