= Francis Boynton (disambiguation) =

Francis Boynton (1677–1739) was an English landowner and MP.

Francis Boynton may also refer to:

- Sir Francis Boynton, 2nd Baronet (1618–1695) of the Boynton baronets
- Sir Francis Boynton, 8th Baronet (1777–1832) of the Boynton baronets

== See also ==
- Boynton (disambiguation)
