= Robert Bedingfield =

17th century English politician

Sir Robert Bedingfield (1637–1711) of Ludgate Street, London, was a British merchant and politician who sat in the House of Commons in 1701. He was Lord Mayor of London in 1706.

Bedingfield was born before 2 June 1637, the fifth son of John Bedingfield of Lincoln’s Inn and Halesworth, Suffolk and his wife Joyce Morgan, daughter of Edmund Morgan of Lambeth, Surrey. He was a woollen-draper and a member of the Merchant Taylors’ Company. He married, by licence dated 22 December 1662, Elizabeth Harvey daughter of Martin Harvey of Weston Favell, Northamptonshire. She died without issue in 1688. He married as his second wife Anne Reynardson, widow of Nicholas Reynardson of London and daughter of William Strode of Newhouse, Warwickshire on 10 October 1689.

Bedingfield was a common councilman for Castle Baynard Ward London from 1682 to 1683 and from 1688 to 1697. He became Alderman of Dowgate on 26 January 1697 and a Master of the Merchant Taylors also in 1697. He was knighted on 18 November 1697. He was a strong Tory and had at one time been a friend of Judge Jeffreys. At the first general election of 1701, he was brought in as Member of Parliament for Hedon by Henry Guy. He was generally inactive in Parliament, but in May 1701 he petitioned the House for relief from the effects of the Act relating to forfeited estates in Ireland. His single vote in the London common council forestalled a petition in support of the Kentish Petitioners. He was blacklisted because he had opposed preparations for war, and did not stand at the second general election of 1701. He became Sheriff of London for the year 1702 to 1703, and became Lord Mayor in 1706. He was named as colonel of the City militia (Blue regiment) among six other Tories in October 1710 and he supported the Tory candidates in the London parliamentary election a month later.

Bedingfield died, suddenly, without issue on 2 May 1711. He was brother of Henry Bedingfield and he left as his principal heir his nephew Thomas Bedingfield of St. John’s, Oxfordshire. Another nephew received by his will "the lease of my dwelling house and shop and the whole benefit and advantage of the same".

Parliament of England
Preceded by Anthony Duncombe; Hugh Bethell	Member of Parliament for Hedon; 1701; With: Anthony Duncombe	Succeeded by Anthony Duncombe; Sir Robert Hildyard
Civic offices
Preceded by Sir Thomas Rawlinson	Lord Mayor of London; 1706	Succeeded by Sir William Withers
