= 1746 in Great Britain =

Events from the year 1746 in Great Britain.

== Incumbents ==
- Monarch – George II
- Prime Minister – Henry Pelham (Whig)

== Events ==
- 8 January – Jacobite rising: Charles Edward Stuart ("Bonnie Prince Charlie" or "The Young Pretender") occupies Stirling.
- 17 January – Government forces suffer a defeat to Jacobite forces at the Battle of Falkirk.
- 10 February – William Pulteney, 1st Earl of Bath forms the Short-lived Ministry following the resignation of Henry Pelham. It lasts a mere two days.
- 21 February – Jacobite rising: Siege of Inverness ends with government forces surrendering Fort George to the Jacobite army.
- 16 April – Battle of Culloden brings an end to the Jacobite rising. Culloden is the last pitched battle fought on British soil. George Frideric Handel composes the oratorio Judas Maccabaeus to commemorate the Duke of Cumberland's victory.
- 3 May – "Battle of Loch nan Uamh": Royal Navy sloops attack French privateers which have landed money (and brandy) intended to aid the Jacobite cause in the Sound of Arisaig.
- 6 May – William Pitt the Elder appointed Paymaster of the Forces and Henry Fox appointed Secretary at War.
- 18 June – Samuel Johnson is contracted to write his A Dictionary of the English Language.
- 27 June – Charles Edward Stuart escapes to the Isle of Skye with the aid of Flora MacDonald.
- 30 July – Francis Towneley, with fellow members of the Jacobite Manchester Regiment convicted of treason, is hanged, drawn and quartered at Kennington Common in London; the heads of two of them become the last to be publicly displayed on Temple Bar, London.
- 1 August – wearing of the kilt is banned in Scotland by the Dress Act.
- 18 August – two of the four rebellious Scottish lords, the Earl of Kilmarnock and Lord Balmerinoch, are beheaded in the Tower (Lord Lovat executed 1747).
- 20 September – Charles Edward Stuart escapes to France with the aid of Flora MacDonald.
- 21 September – in India, Madras is captured by the French led by Joseph François Dupleix.

=== Undated ===
- William Cookworthy discovers kaolin in Cornwall.
- An act to enforce the execution of an act of this session of parliament, for granting to his Majesty several rates and duties upon houses, windows, or lights includes a general provision confirming that all statutes naming England apply equally to Wales and Berwick-upon-Tweed.

== Births ==
- 3 June – James Hook, composer (died 1827)
- 28 September – William Jones, philologist (died 1794)
- 22 October – James Northcote, painter (died 1831)
- Isaac Swainson, botanist (died 1812)

== Deaths ==
- 4 February – Robert Blair, poet (born 1699)
- 14 June – Colin Maclaurin, mathematician (born 1698)
- 2 July – Thomas Baker, antiquarian (born 1656)
- 2 October – Josiah Burchett, Secretary of the Admiralty (born c. 1666)
- 6 December – Lady Grizel Baillie, poet (born 1665)
- 8 December – Charles Radclyffe, politician (born 1693)

== See also ==
- 1746 in Wales
