= Granville ministry =

Granville ministry may refer to:

- Carteret ministry, the British government dominated by John Carteret, 2nd Earl Granville (1742–1744)
- Bath–Granville ministry, the British government under Lord Bath and Lord Granville (1746)
