= Henry Boynton (disambiguation) =

Henry Boynton (1835–1905), was a Union Army officer.

Henry Boynton may also refer to:

- Sir Henry Boynton, son-in-law of William Cavendish (courtier)
- Reverend Henry Boynton, father of Sir Francis Boynton, 4th Baronet

== See also ==
- Henry Boynton Smith (1815–1877), American theologian
