= General Pulteney =

General Pulteney may refer to:

- Harry Pulteney (1686–1767), British Army general
- James Pulteney (c. 1755–1811), British Army general
- William Pulteney (British Army officer) (1861–1941), British Army lieutenant general
