= Anthony Duncombe =

English politician

Anthony Duncombe (died 4 April 1708) was an English politician.

Duncombe was the son of Alexander Duncombe, of Drayton, Buckinghamshire, by Mary Paulye, daughter of Richard Paulye, Lord of the manor of Whitchurch, Buckinghamshire. Wealthy banker Sir Charles Duncombe was his brother. He was returned to Parliament for Hedon in 1698, a seat he held until July 1702, and again between November 1702 and his death in 1708.

Duncombe married Jane Cornwallis, daughter of the Honourable Frederick Cornwallis, younger son of Frederick Cornwallis, 1st Baron Cornwallis. He died in April 1708. His son Anthony inherited half of the enormous estates of his uncle Sir Charles Duncombe and was elevated to the peerage as Baron Feversham in 1747. Duncombe's sister Ursula Duncombe was the ancestor of the present-day Barons Feversham.

Parliament of England
Preceded by Thomas Frankland; Hugh Bethell	Member of Parliament for Hedon; 1698–July 1702; With: Hugh Bethell 1698–January 1701; Sir Robert Bedingfield January–December 1701; Sir Robert Hildyard, Bt 1701–July 1702	Succeeded by Sir Charles Duncombe; Henry Guy
Preceded by Sir Charles Duncombe; Henry Guy	Member of Parliament for Hedon; November 1702–1707; With: Henry Guy November 1702–1705; William Pulteney 1705–1707	Succeeded by Parliament of Great Britain
Parliament of Great Britain
Preceded by Parliament of England	Member of Parliament for Hedon; 1707–1708; With: William Pulteney	Succeeded by William Pulteney; Hugh Cholmley
Military offices
Preceded by The 3rd Viscount of Irvine	Governor of Scarborough Castle; 1702–1708	Succeeded by The 4th Viscount of Irvine
