= William Boynton =

English Member of Parliament (1641–1689)

Lieutenant-Colonel William Boynton (14 July 1641 – 17 August 1689) was an English Member of Parliament.

== Life ==
He was the eldest son of Sir Francis Boynton, 2nd Baronet of Burton Agnes and his wife Constance Fiennes, daughter of William Fiennes, 1st Viscount Saye and Sele. He entered Parliament in 1680 as member for Hedon, remaining an MP until 1685.

Dying before his father, he never succeeded to the baronetcy.

== Family ==
Boynton married Elizabeth Bernard, daughter of John Bernard of Hull, and they had three children:

- Griffith Boynton (1664–1731), who succeeded as 3rd Baronet in 1695.
- Mary
- Constance, who married Richard Kirkshaw

Parliament of England
Preceded by Sir Hugh Bethell; Henry Guy	Member of Parliament for Hedon; 1680–1685; With: Henry Guy	Succeeded by Charles Duncombe; Henry Guy
