= Sir Robert Hildyard, 2nd Baronet =

Sir Robert Hildyard, 2nd Baronet (1671 – 30 November 1729), of Patrington and Winestead in the East Riding of Yorkshire, was an English landowner and Member of Parliament.

He was the eldest son of Christopher Hildyard; he succeeded to the baronetcy on the death of his grandfather, Sir Robert Hildyard, 1st Baronet on 7 March 1685. He served in Parliament as member for Hedon from December 1701 to July 1702. He was responsible for building Winestead Hall.

He was Lieutenant-Colonel commanding the East Riding Regiment of Militia at the time of the Jacobite rising of 1715.

Hildyard never married. On his death in 1729, the baronetcy passed to his nephew, Sir Robert Hildyard, 3rd Baronet.

Parliament of England
Preceded by Anthony Duncombe; Sir Robert Bedingfield	Member of Parliament for Hedon; 1701–1702; With: Anthony Duncombe	Succeeded by Sir Charles Duncombe; Henry Guy
Baronetage of England
Preceded by Robert Hildyard	Baronet (of Patrington); 1685–1729	Succeeded by Robert Hildyard
