= Mayor of Hedon =

List of mayors of Hedon, Yorkshire, England

The following were mayors of Hedon, Yorkshire, England:

1683-4: Hugh Bethell
