= Thomas Fairfax, 1st Viscount Fairfax =

English landowner and politician

The Right Honourable The Viscount Fairfax JP

Member of Parliament for Hedon
- In office 1621–1626 Serving with Sir Matthew Boynton, Bt, Christopher Hilliard
- Preceded by: Christopher Hilliard; William Sheffield
- Succeeded by: Sir Christopher Hilliard; Thomas Alured

Member of Parliament for Boroughbridge
- In office 1601–1601 Serving with Richard Whaley
- Preceded by: Henry Fanshawe; Thomas Crompton
- Succeeded by: John Ferne; Sir Henry Jenkins

Personal details
- Born: Thomas Fairfax; 1575
- Died: 23 December 1636 (aged 60–61)
- Spouses: Catherine Constable (m. 1594; died 1626) Lady Mary Bamburgh (m. 1627)
- Children: 11
- Parent(s): Sir William Fairfax; Jane Stapleton
- Education: Caius College, Cambridge

Thomas Fairfax, 1st Viscount Fairfax of Emley JP (1575 – 23 December 1636) was an English landowner and politician who sat in the House of Commons at various times between 1601 and 1626. He was created Viscount Fairfax in the Peerage of Ireland in 1629. He "erected a mansion on Bishophill (York) early in Elizabeth's reign".

== Early life ==
Fairfax was the only son and heir of Sir William Fairfax of Gilling Castle and Walton, Yorkshire, by his second wife Jane Stapleton, daughter and heiress of Brian Stapleton of Burton Joyce. He attended school at Gilling and entered Caius College, Cambridge, in 1590. He succeeded his father to the estates of Gilling and Walton in 1597 and was a sheep farmer and an encloser.

== Career ==
In 1600 he was commissioner for musters for the West Riding of Yorkshire. In 1601, he was elected Member of Parliament for Boroughbridge. He was a J.P. for the North Riding of Yorkshire by 1603 and was knighted in April 1603. From July 1603 he was a member of the council in the north, and was vice-president of the council in the north in 1608 and 1616.

In 1621, he was elected MP for Hedon. He was re-elected MP for Hedon in 1624, 1625, and 1626. From 1627 to 1628, he was High Sheriff of Yorkshire. He was created Viscount Fairfax on 10 January 1629.

== Personal life ==
Fairfax married Catherine Constable, daughter of Sir Henry Constable of Burton Constable in 1594 and had six sons and five daughters. She was an open Catholic and was convicted of recusancy at regular intervals from 1599 until her death. She does not appear to have been fined, which may be attributable to Fairfax's friendship with Sir Arthur Ingram, Secretary to the Council of the North, and collector, for a time, of recusancy fines. She also employed Catholic maids and escaped penalty for this; and although it was also an offence, at least two of the sons went abroad to Catholic colleges. Before her death in 1626, they were the parents of at least eleven children, including:

- Thomas Fairfax, 2nd Viscount Fairfax (c. 1599–24 Sept 1641), who married Alathea Howard, daughter of Sir Philip Howard (eldest son of Lord William Howard, a son of Thomas Howard, 4th Duke of Norfolk).
- Hon. Henry Fairfax of Burlington (1601-1650), who married Frances Barker, daughter of Henry Barker of Hurst.
- Hon. William Fairfax of Lythe, who married Abigail (née Cholmeley) Waterhouse (widow of Sir Edward Waterhouse), daughter of John Barker of Ipswich. After her death, he married Mary Cholmeley, daughter of Marmaduke Cholmeley of Brandsby.
- Hon. Nicholas Fairfax of Acton (d. 1657), who married Isabel Beckwith, daughter and co-heiress of Thomas Beckwith of Acton.
- Hon. Jane Fairfax, who married Cuthbert Morley in 1634.
- Hon. Margaret Fairfax, who married Watkinson Payler of Thoralby and, after his death, John Hotham of Scorborough.
- Hon. Katherine Fairfax (d. 1666/7), who married Robert Stapleton of Wighill in 1622. After his death, she married, as his second wife, Sir Matthew Boynton, 1st Baronet in 1636. After his death, she married, as his second wife, Sir Arthur Ingram (first son of Sir Arthur Ingram of Temple Newsam) in 1647. Her fourth marriage was to William Wickham of Roxby in 1657.
- Hon. Mary Fairfax, who married Sir Thomas Layton of Layton and Sexhow.
- Hon. Dorothy Fairfax (d. 1686), who married, as his second wife, John Ingram (second son of Sir Arthur Ingram of Temple Newsam). After his death, she married Sir Thomas Norcliffe of Langton, in 1639.

In 1627, Fairfax remarried to Lady Mary Bamburgh, widow of Sir William Bamburgh, 1st Baronet of Howsham, and daughter of Sir Robert Forth of Butley, Suffolk.

Fairfax died at Howsham at the age of about 61 and was buried at Scrayingham. His widow died in March 1638/9.

=== Descendants ===
Through his third son William, he was a grandfather of William Fairfax, 8th Viscount Fairfax (d. 1738), who married Elizabeth Gerard (a daughter of Capt. Gerard), parents of Hon. Alathea Fairfax (wife of Ralph Pigott of Whitton) and Charles Gregory Fairfax, 9th Viscount Fairfax (d. 1772). He married the Hon. Elizabeth Constable, widow of William Constable, 4th Viscount of Dunbar and eldest daughter of Hugh Clifford, 2nd Baron Clifford of Chudleigh, in 1719. On the death of the 9th Viscount Fairfax, the Viscountcy of Fairfax became extinct. After the death of his only surviving child, Hon. Anne Fairfax in 1793, the Gilling Castle estates passed to her first cousin once removed, Charles Gregory Pigott later Fairfax.

Political offices
Preceded by Sir Thomas Norcliffe	High Sheriff of Yorkshire; 1627–1628	Succeeded by Sir Matthew Boynton, Bt
Parliament of England
Preceded by Henry Fanshawe; Thomas Crompton	Member of Parliament for Boroughbridge; 1601; With: Richard Whaley	Succeeded by John Ferne; Sir Henry Jenkins
Preceded by Christopher Hilliard; William Sheffield	Member of Parliament for Hedon; 1621–1626; With: Sir Matthew Boynton, 1st Baronet; Christopher Hilliard	Succeeded by Sir Christopher Hilliard; Thomas Alured
Peerage of Ireland
New creation	Viscount Fairfax of Emley; 1629–1636	Succeeded by Thomas Fairfax
