= George Johnstone (1764–1813) =

British politician (1764–1813)

George Johnstone (10 December 1764 – 20 November 1813) was a British politician. He sat in the House of Commons of Great Britain and then in the House of Commons of the United Kingdom from 1800 to 1813.

Johnstone was born in Pensacola, Florida. He was one of four illegitimate sons of George Johnstone, then a captain in the Royal Navy, later an admiral. His mother was Martha Ford.

He was elected at a by-election in 1800 as Member of Parliament (MP) for the borough of Aldeburgh. The following year, he bought an estate in Wales and began canvassing the borough of Hedon in Yorkshire, and topped the poll at the 1802 general election. He was re-elected 3 times, facing a contest only in 1807, and held the seat until his death in 1813.

== See also ==
- Cannizaro Park

Parliament of Great Britain
Preceded by Sir John Aubrey, Bt; Michael Angelo Taylor	Member of Parliament for Aldeburgh; March 1800 – December 1800; With: Sir John Aubrey, Bt	Succeeded by Parliament of the United Kingdom
Parliament of the United Kingdom
Preceded by Parliament of Great Britain	Member of Parliament for Aldeburgh; 1801–1802; With: Sir John Aubrey, Bt	Succeeded by Sir John Aubrey, Bt; John McMahon
Preceded by Christopher Atkinson Saville; Lionel Darell	Member of Parliament for Hedon; 1802–1813; With: Christopher Atkinson Saville to 1806; Anthony Browne from 1806	Succeeded by Anthony Browne; John Broadhurst
