= Lushington baronets =

Title in the Baronetage of Great Britain

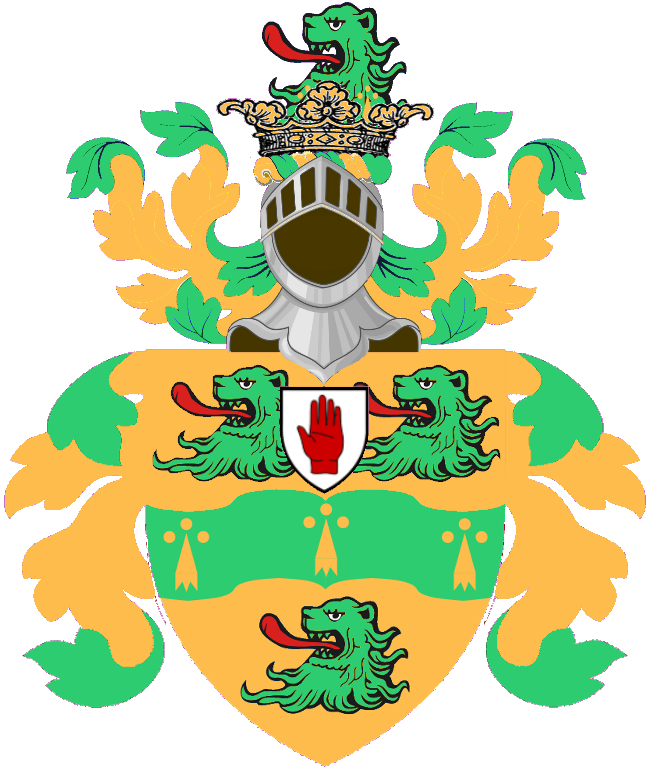
- Crest: A Lion’s Head erased Vert charged on the erasure with three ermine spots Or ducally gorged Argent
- Shield: Or on a Fess wavy between three Lions' Heads erased Vert langued Gules as many Ermine Spots of the Field.

The Lushington baronetcy, of South Hill Park in the County of Berkshire, is a title in the baronetage of Great Britain, created on 26 April 1791 for Sir Stephen Lushington MP, Chairman of the East India Company in 1790.

The 2nd Baronet was HM Consul-General to Naples from 1815 until 1832.

== Lushington baronets, of South Hill Park (1791) ==
- Sir Stephen Lushington, 1st Baronet (1744–1807)
- Sir Henry Lushington, 2nd Baronet (1775–1863)
- Sir Henry Lushington, 3rd Baronet (1803–1897)
- Sir Henry Lushington, 4th Baronet (1826–1898)
- Sir Andrew Patrick Douglas Lushington, 5th Baronet (1861–1937)
- Sir Herbert Castleman Lushington, 6th Baronet (1879–1968)
- Sir Henry Edmund Castleman Lushington, 7th Baronet (1909–1988)
- Sir John Richard Castleman Lushington, 8th Baronet (born 1938)

The heir apparent is the present baronet's eldest son Squadron Leader Richard Douglas Longfield Lushington (born 1968).

== Extended family ==
- Stephen Lushington, second son of the 1st Baronet, was an Admiralty Judge and Member of Parliament.
- Charles Manners Lushington, third son of the 1st Baronet, was Member of Parliament for Westminster from 1847 to 1852.
- The 2nd Baronet's second son was Admiral Sir Stephen Lushington.
- The 2nd Baronet's sixth son Frederick Astell Lushington JP (1815–1892), of the Bengal Civil Service, was grandfather of the 6th Baronet.

Baronetage of Great Britain
| Preceded by Kennaway baronets | Lushington baronets of South Hill Park; 26 April 1791 | Succeeded by James baronets |
