= Sir Lionel Darell, 1st Baronet =

English politician and landowner

Sir Lionel Darell, Bt

Member of Parliament for Hedon
- In office 1784–1802 Serving with William Chaytor, Beilby Thompson, Christopher Atkinson
- Preceded by: Stephen Lushington; William Chaytor
- Succeeded by: George Johnstone; Christopher Atkinson

Personal details
- Born: Lionel Darell; 25 September 1742 Lisbon, Portugal
- Died: 30 October 1803 (aged 61)
- Spouse: Isabella Tullie (m. 1766; died 1800)
- Relations: Sir William Darell, 4th Baronet (grandson)
- Parent(s): Lionel Darell; Honoria Hardwick

Sir Lionel Darell, 1st Baronet (25 September 1742 – 30 October 1803) was an English politician and East India Company official.

== Early life ==
Darell was born on 25 September 1742 at Lisbon, Portugal. He was the eldest son of Lionel Darell of Bedford Row, Holborn, and Honoria Hardwick.

His paternal grandparents were Edward Darell and Sabina Hall (a daughter of the Rev. Richard Hall, Rector at Philleigh, Cornwall). His maternal grandfather was Humphrey Hardwick, a merchant who served as Vice-Consul at Lisbon, Portugal.

== Career ==
Escutcheon of the Darell baronets of Richmond Hill

Darell was a senior merchant with the East India Company in 1768, keeper of account deposits in 1770 and served as director from 1780 to 1783, 1785 to 1788, 1790 to 1793, 1795 to 1798, and from 1800 until his death in 1803. He was Colonel of the 1st Regiment of the Loyal East India Volunteers. He made an unsuccessful attempt to as a Member of Parliament for Lyme Regis from 1780 to 1784 and Hedon from 1784 to 1802.

From 1775 to 1795, he lived in a Georgian townhouse at 69 Dean Street, Soho, London, built between 1732 and 1735 on the former Pitt estate. Today, it is the home of the Gargoyle Club.

He was created a baronet of Richmond Hill in the County of Surrey, in the Baronetage of Great Britain on 12 May 1795.

== Personal life ==
On 30 July 1766 at St George the Martyr in Queen Square, he married Isabella Tullie (d. 1800), daughter of Timothy Tullie, a director of the East India Company. Before her death on 6 May 1800, they were the parents of:

- Clarissa Darell (d. 1812), who married Capt. James Sharpe in 1807.
- Sir Harry Verelst Darell, 2nd Baronet (1768–1828), a merchant who married Amelia Mary Anne Beecher, daughter of William Beecher of Howbury, in 1809.
- Florentia Elizabeth Darell (b. 1777), who married Lt.-Col. Sir Miles Nightingale in 1800.

After a few days' illness, Sir Lionel died on 30 October 1803.

=== Descendants ===
Through his son Harry, he was a grandfather of Sir Harry Darell, 3rd Baronet (1814–1853) and the Rev. Sir William Darell, 4th Baronet (1817–1883).

Parliament of Great Britain
Preceded by Stephen Lushington; William Chaytor	Member of Parliament for Hedon; 1784–1802; With: William Chaytor 1784–1790; Beilby Thompson 1790–1796; Christopher Atkinson 1796–1802	Succeeded by George Johnstone; Christopher Atkinson
Baronetage of Great Britain
New title	Baronet (of Richmond Hill); 1795–1803	Succeeded by Harry Verelst Darell
