= Sir Stephen Lushington, 1st Baronet =

British politician

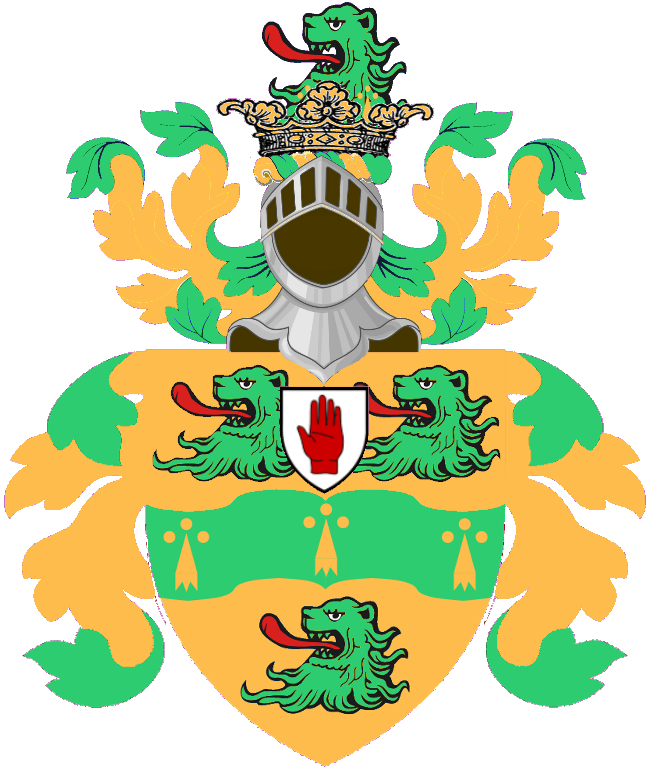
Achievement of arms

Sir Stephen Lushington, 1st Baronet (17 June 1744 – 12 January 1807), of South Hill Park in Easthampstead, Berkshire, was an English Member of Parliament and Chairman of the East India Company.

== Life ==
Lushington was the third son of the Reverend Henry Lushington, vicar of Eastbourne.

From 1782 he was a director of the East India Company, and supported the reforms of the company being proposed by Charles James Fox; these would have brought the company under the control of a board of commissioners appointed by Parliament, and it was intended that Lushington should be one of the assistant commissioners. In 1783, as Fox prepared to introduce his India Bill in the House of Commons, Christopher Atkinson, one of the MPs for Hedon in Yorkshire, was convicted of fraud and would therefore be expelled from the House. Hedon was a rotten borough where the Foxites could expect their candidate to be elected, and Lushington's name was put forward by Prime Minister Portland to fill the vacancy.

Atkinson was formally expelled from the Commons on 4 December 1783, and a writ for the by-election was issued. However, the following day the Commons amended the East India Bill to make the assistant commissioners ineligible to sit in Parliament. This forced Lushington to choose between an assistant commissionership and a seat in Parliament and, knowing that the majority of the East India directors opposed Fox's bill he decided the latter was preferable. On 15 December he was elected unopposed for Hedon, but on the same day the House of Lords unexpectedly defeated Fox's India bill and the government fell.

Lushington spoke in opposition to the East India bill proposed by the new government under Pitt the Younger, which placed control of the Company in the hands of a board appointed by the Crown rather than by Parliament. In the general election of 1784 he was a candidate at Hastings, rather than defending his seat at Hedon, but was defeated.

He was deputy chairman of the East India Company in 1789–1790, and its chairman for three terms - 1790–1791, 1795–1796 and 1799–1800. He was created a baronet on 26 April 1791.

He returned to Parliament in 1790 as member for Helston, and was an MP for the rest of his life, subsequently also representing Mitchell, Penryn and Plympton Erle.

== Family ==
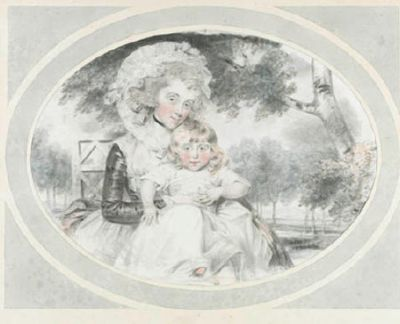
Hester Lushington with her young son Stephen

In 1771 Lushington married Hester Boldero (d. 1830), whose father John settled the manors of Aspenden and Berkesdon in Hertfordshire on the couple. The family were based at South Hill Park near Bracknell in Berkshire from 1787 to 1807.

Their children included:

- Sir Henry Lushington (1775–1863), who succeeded to the baronetcy
- Sophia Lushington m. Denzil Onslow
- Stephen Lushington (1782–1873), a Member of Parliament and later a judge
- Charles Lushington (1785–1866), secretary to the government of Bengal and later also an MP
- Hester Lushington.

Coat of arms of Sir Stephen Lushington, 1st Baronet

Crest
A lion’s heads erased Vert charged on the erasure with three ermine spots Or ducally gorged Argent.

Escutcheon
Escutcheon = Or on a fess wavy between three lions' heads erased Vert langued Gules as many ermine spots of the field.

Parliament of Great Britain
Preceded by William Chaytor; Christopher Atkinson	Member of Parliament for Hedon; 1783–1784; With: William Chaytor	Succeeded by William Chaytor; Lionel Darell
Preceded by James Lamb; Roger Wilbraham	Member of Parliament for Helston; 1790–1796; With: Gilbert Elliot 1790-95; Charles Abbot 1795-96	Succeeded by Charles Abbot; Richard Richards
Preceded by Sir Christopher Hawkins; David Howell	Member of Parliament for Mitchell; 1796–1800; With: Sir Christopher Hawkins 1796-99; John Simpson 1799–1800	Succeeded by Parliament of the United Kingdom
Parliament of the United Kingdom
Preceded by Parliament of Great Britain	Member of Parliament for Mitchell; 1801–1802; With: John Simpson	Succeeded by Robert Dallas; Robert Sharpe Ainslie
Preceded by Thomas Wallace; William Meeke	Member of Parliament for Penryn; 1802–1806; With: Sir John Nicholl	Succeeded by Henry Swann; Sir Christopher Hawkins, bt
Preceded by Edward Golding; Philip Metcalfe	Member of Parliament for Plympton Erle; 1806–1807; With: The Earl of Londonderry	Succeeded by The Earl of Londonderry; William Assheton Harbord
Baronetage of Great Britain
New creation	Baronet (of Hill Park); 1791–1807	Succeeded by Henry Lushington
