= Francis Appleyard =

English cricketer

Personal information
- Full name: Francis Appleyard
- Born: 26 September 1905; Clifton, Yorkshire, England
- Died: 12 October 1971 (aged 66); Stevenage, England
- Batting: Right-handed
- Bowling: Right-arm fast-medium

Domestic team information
- Years: Team
- 1946–1947: Essex
- 1946–1950: MCC

Career statistics
Competition	First-class
Matches	18
Runs scored	74
Batting average	6.72
100s/50s	0/0
Top score	15*
Balls bowled	2,951
Wickets	30
Bowling average	40.33
5 wickets in innings	2
10 wickets in match	0
Best bowling	5/14
Catches/stumpings	12/–
- Source: CricketArchive, 18 October 2008

Francis Appleyard (26 September 1905 – 12 October 1971) was an English first-class cricketer. He was a right-handed batsman and a right-arm medium-fast bowler. He was born in Clifton, Yorkshire and died in Stevenage.

Appleyard began his Minor Counties career playing for Hertfordshire in 1931, and continued to play Minor Counties cricket until the outbreak of the Second World War. He made his first-class cricketing debut in 1939 for Minor Counties. During the war, Appleyard made ten appearances for a British Empire XI against various assembled teams.

Appleyard made his County Championship debut in the 1946 season, for Essex. A steady fast-medium bowler, Appleyard had best bowling figures of 5 for 14. He made four further first-class appearances during 1947, a season which once again saw Essex under-perform in the County Championship and he did not play again in the County Championship beyond this season.

Appleyard made just one further first-class appearance, for the Marylebone Cricket Club against Minor Counties, in 1950.

Appleyard's sons, Peter and John, both played cricket for Hertfordshire.
