= George Berkeley (died 1746) =

English politician

George Berkeley (1693? – 29 October 1746) was a British politician who sat in the House of Commons for 26 years from 1720 to 1746.

== Early life ==
Berkeley was the fourth and youngest son of Charles Berkeley, 2nd Earl of Berkeley, and his wife Elizabeth Noel. (Elizabeth was the daughter of Baptist Noel, Viscount Campden, and the sister of Edward, first earl of Gainsborough.) He attended Westminster School from its foundation in 1708 and Trinity College, Cambridge, in 1711, graduating MA there in 1713.

== Career ==
Berkeley was returned as Member of Parliament for Dover at a by-election on 20 December 1720. He was returned unopposed at the general election of 1722. On 28 May 1723 he received an appointment as master keeper and governor of St Katharine's Hospital in London, and filled that post until his death. He was elected in a contest at Dover in 1727. At the 1734 general election he was returned unopposed as MP for Hedon, Yorkshire. At the 1741 general election, he was initially defeated, but was seated on petition on 4 March 1742. Pro-Walpole at first, Berkeley was alienated from him by his brother Lord Berkeley's dismissal from the post of First Lord of the Admiralty on the accession of George II, and switched loyalties to Pulteney.

== Family and legacy ==
He married Henrietta Howard, Countess of Suffolk, on 26 June 1735, as her second husband and nine months after she ceased to be George II's mistress and – though they had no surviving children – the marriage was far happier than her first. He had probably met her through his sister Lady Elizabeth Germain, a friend of Henrietta, but the reasons for Henrrietta's choice of second husband were far from clear to court commentators. One of them, Lord Hervey, described him as:

neither young, handsome, healthy, nor rich, which made people wonder what induced Lady Suffolk's prudence to deviate into this unaccountable piece of folly: some imagined it was to persuade the world that nothing criminal had ever passed between her and the king, others that it was to pique the king. If this was her reason, she succeeded very ill in her design.

However, in a letter from Elizabeth Germain to Jonathan Swift on 12 July 1735, Elizabeth described Lady Suffolk as

indeed four or five years older than [George]; but for all that he has appeared to all the world, as well as to me, to have long had (that is, ever since she has been a widow, so pray do not mistake me) a most violent passion for her, as well as esteem and value for her numberless good qualities.

Parliament of Great Britain
Preceded by Philip Papillon; Matthew Aylmer	Member of Parliament for Dover; 1720–1734; With: Henry Furnese	Succeeded by David Papillon; Thomas Revell
Preceded by Harry Pulteney; William Pulteney	Member of Parliament for Hedon; 1734–1741; With: Sir Francis Boynton, Bt 1734–1739; Harry Pulteney 1739–1741	Succeeded by Francis Chute; Luke Robinson
Preceded by Francis Chute; Luke Robinson	Member of Parliament for Hedon; 1742–1746; With: Earl of Mountrath 1742–1744; George Anson from 1744	Succeeded by George Anson; Samuel Gumley
