= Broad Bottom ministry =

Government of Great Britain

- Cabinet of Great Britain
- 1744 – 1754
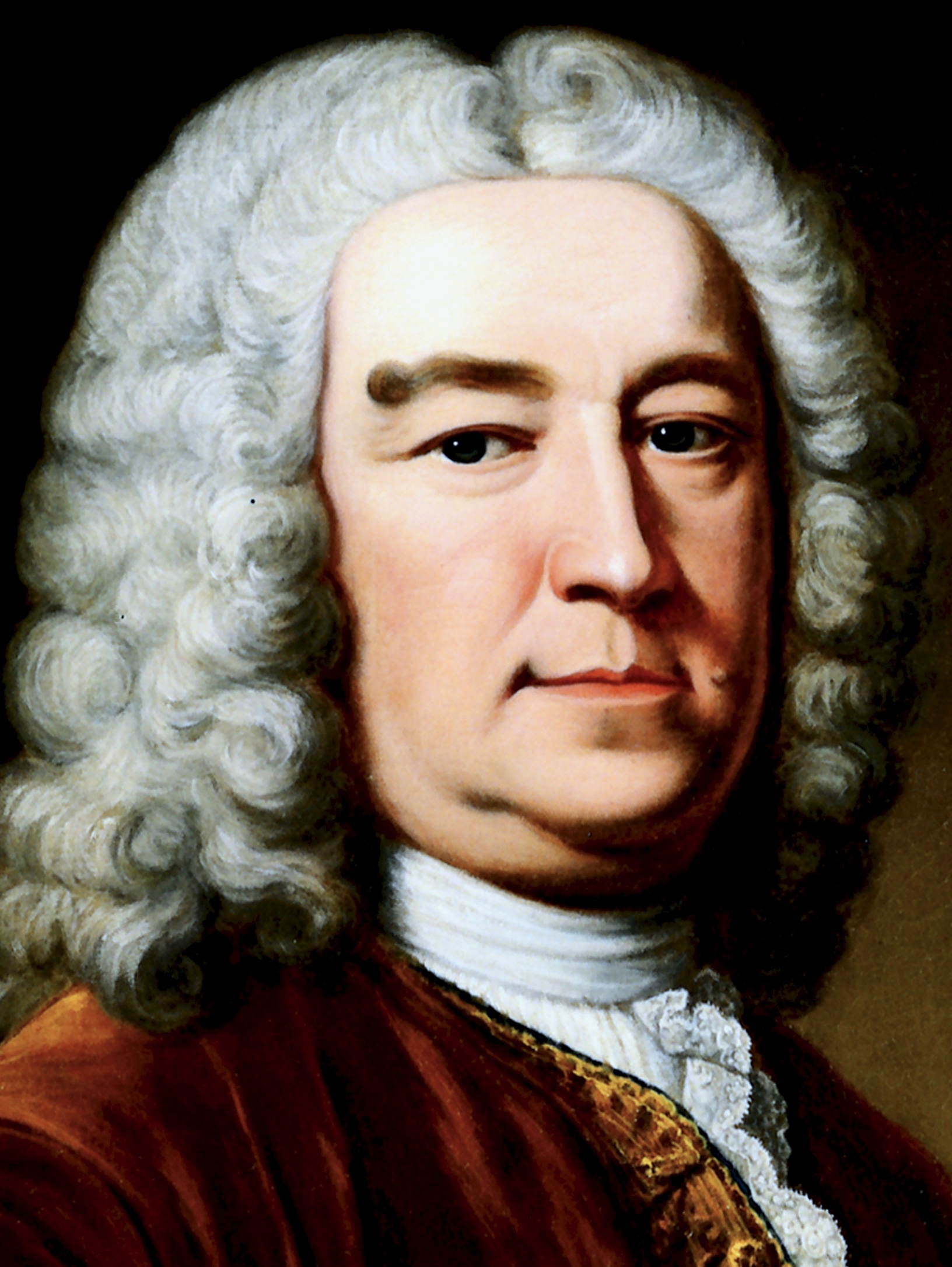
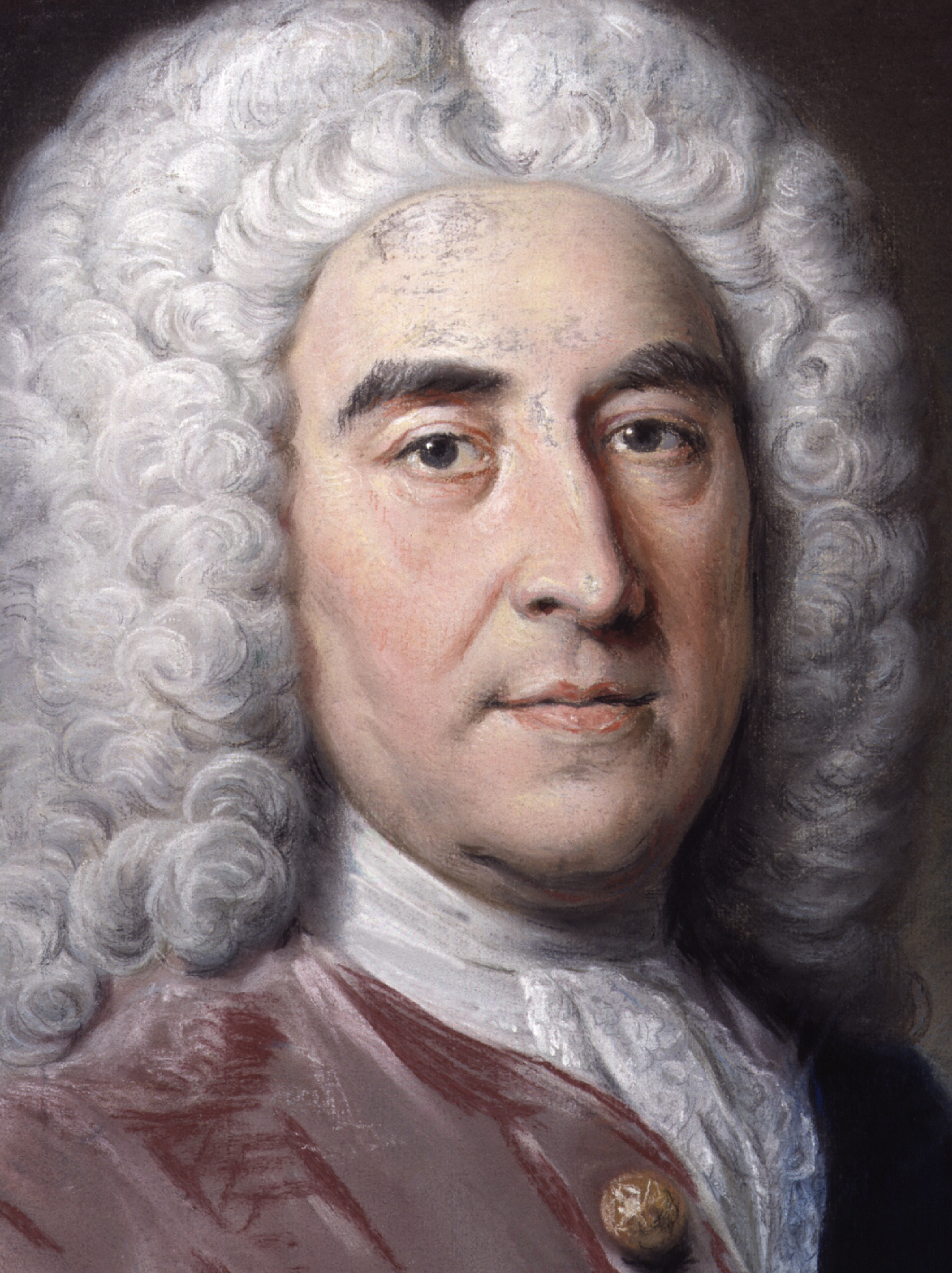
- Henry Pelham, Prime Minister of Great Britain (left) and Thomas Pelham-Holles, 1st Duke of Newcastle, Secretary of State (right)
- Date established: 24 November 1744 (first); 14 February 1746 (second)
- Date dissolved: 10 February 1744 (first); 6 March 1754 (second)

Leadership and composition
- Monarch: George II
- Prime Minister: Henry Pelham
- Member party: Whigs
- Status in legislature: Majority
- Opposition party: Tories
- Opposition leader: Sir Watkin Williams-Wynn

Formation and history
- Elections: 1741 general election 1747 general election
- Legislature terms: 1741–1747; 1747–1754
- Predecessor: Carteret ministry (first); Short-lived ministry (second)
- Successor: Short-lived ministry (first); First Newcastle ministry (second)

The Broad Bottom ministry was the factional coalition government of Great Britain between 1744 and 1754. It was led by the two Pelham brothers in Parliament, Prime Minister Henry Pelham in the House of Commons and Thomas Pelham-Holles, 1st Duke of Newcastle in the House of Lords.

Early in 1746 George II wished a change of prime minister, and Pelham lost power, but only briefly. On returning to office he put in place a strengthened broad coalition of Whigs. The second Broad Bottom administration lasted from Pelham's resumption of power until his death in 1754. (Note: Beyond the more senior ministers listed (see below), other significant figures in the ministry from 1746 include Henry Fox as Secretary at War and William Pitt as Paymaster of the Forces.)

== Ministry ==
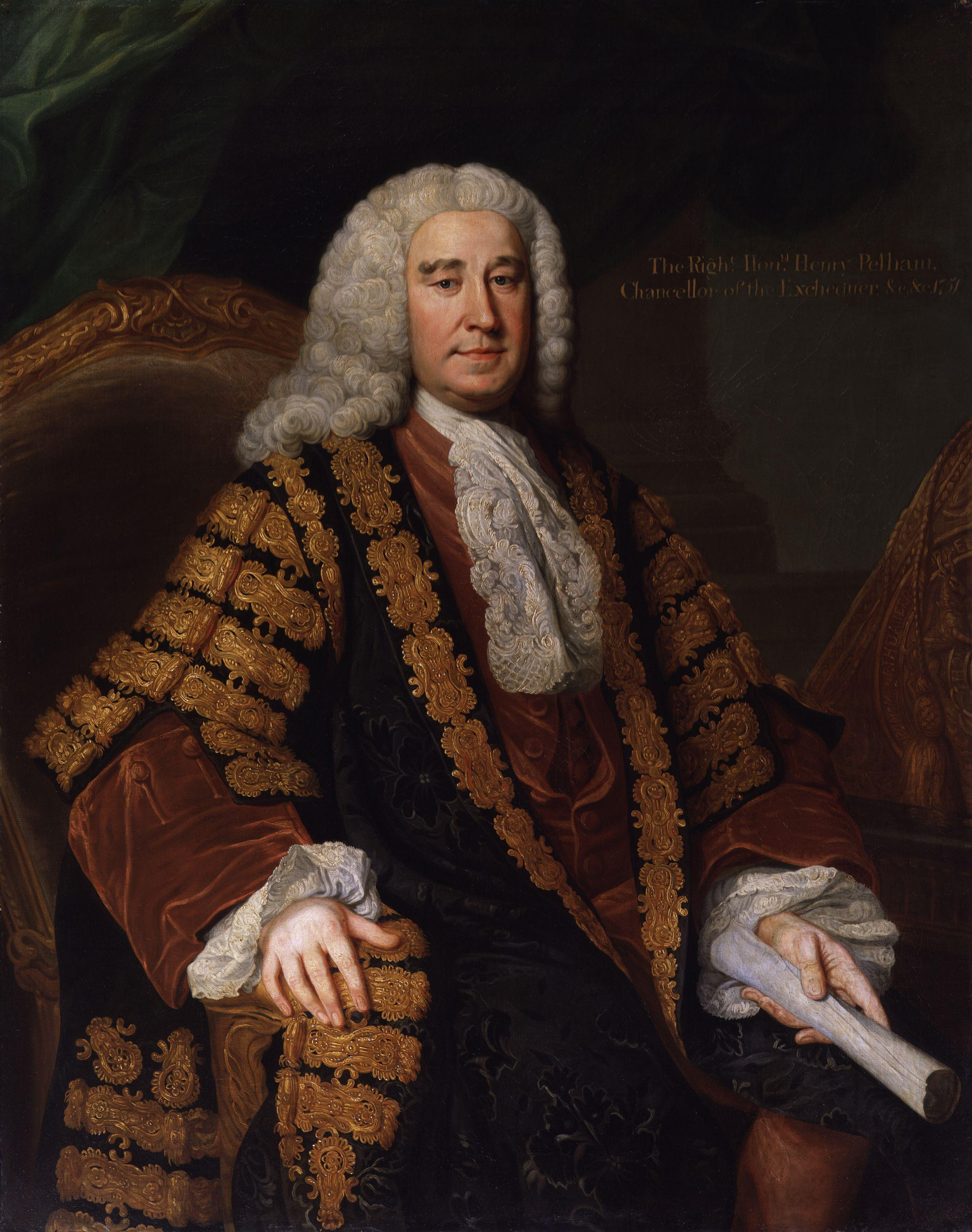
Portrait of Henry Pelham by William Hoare, 1751. Pelham was both Prime Minister and Chancellor of the Exchequer

Portfolio	Minister	Took office	Left office
First Lord of the Treasury; Chancellor of the Exchequer	Henry Pelham (head of ministry)	Continued	1754
Lord Chancellor	Philip Yorke, 1st Baron Hardwicke	Continued	1754
Lord President of the Council	William Stanhope, 1st Earl of Harrington	Continued	1745
Lord President of the Council	Lionel Sackville, 1st Duke of Dorset	1745	1751
Lord President of the Council	John Carteret, 2nd Earl Granville	1751	1754
Lord Privy Seal	John Leveson-Gower, 2nd Baron Gower	1744	1754
Secretary of State for the Southern Department	Thomas Pelham-Holles, 1st Duke of Newcastle (head of ministry)	Continued	1748
Secretary of State for the Southern Department	John Russell, 4th Duke of Bedford	1748	1751
Secretary of State for the Southern Department	Robert Darcy, 4th Earl of Holderness	1751	1754
Secretary of State for the Northern Department	William Stanhope, 1st Earl of Harrington	1744	1746
Secretary of State for the Northern Department	Philip Stanhope, 4th Earl of Chesterfield	1746	1748
Secretary of State for the Northern Department	Thomas Pelham-Holles, 1st Duke of Newcastle (head of ministry)	1748	1754
Master-General of the Ordnance	John Montagu, 2nd Duke of Montagu	Continued	1749
Master-General of the Ordnance	Vacant	1749	1754
First Lord of the Admiralty	John Russell, 4th Duke of Bedford	1744	1748
First Lord of the Admiralty	John Montagu, 4th Earl of Sandwich	1748	1751
First Lord of the Admiralty	George Anson, 1st Baron Anson	1751	1754
Keeper of the Great Seal of Scotland	Archibald Campbell, 3rd Duke of Argyll	1744	1754
Secretary of State for Scotland	John Hay, 4th Marquess of Tweeddale	1744	1746
Lord Chamberlain of the Household	Charles FitzRoy, 2nd Duke of Grafton	1744	1754
Master of the Horse	Charles Lennox, 2nd Duke of Richmond	1744	1750
Master of the Horse	Vacant	1750	1751
Master of the Horse	William Cavendish, Marquess of Hartington	1751	1754

== See also ==
- 1747 British general election

== Works cited ==
- Colley, Linda (1985), In Defiance of Oligarchy: The Tory Party 1714–60, Cambridge University Press, ISBN 978-0-5213-1311-7
- Haydn, Joseph (1851), The Book of Dignities, London: Longmans, Brown, Green, and Longmans
- Kulisheck, P. J. (2004), "Pelham, Henry (1694–1754)", Oxford Dictionary of National Biography (online ed.), Oxford University Press, doi:10.1093/ref:odnb/21789 (Subscription, Wikipedia Library access or UK public library membership required.)

Preceded by Carteret ministry	Government of Great Britain; 24 November 1744 – 10 February 1746	Succeeded by Short-lived ministry
Preceded by Short-lived ministry	Government of Great Britain; 14 February 1746 – 6 March 1754	Succeeded by First Newcastle ministry
