= John Constable (of Burton Constable) =

Member of the Parliament of England

Sir John Constable (1526–1579), of Burton Constable, Halsham, and Kirby Knowle Castle, Yorkshire, was an English Member of Parliament for Hedon March 1553, October 1553, 1558 and 1563, and possibly for Yorkshire in 1555.

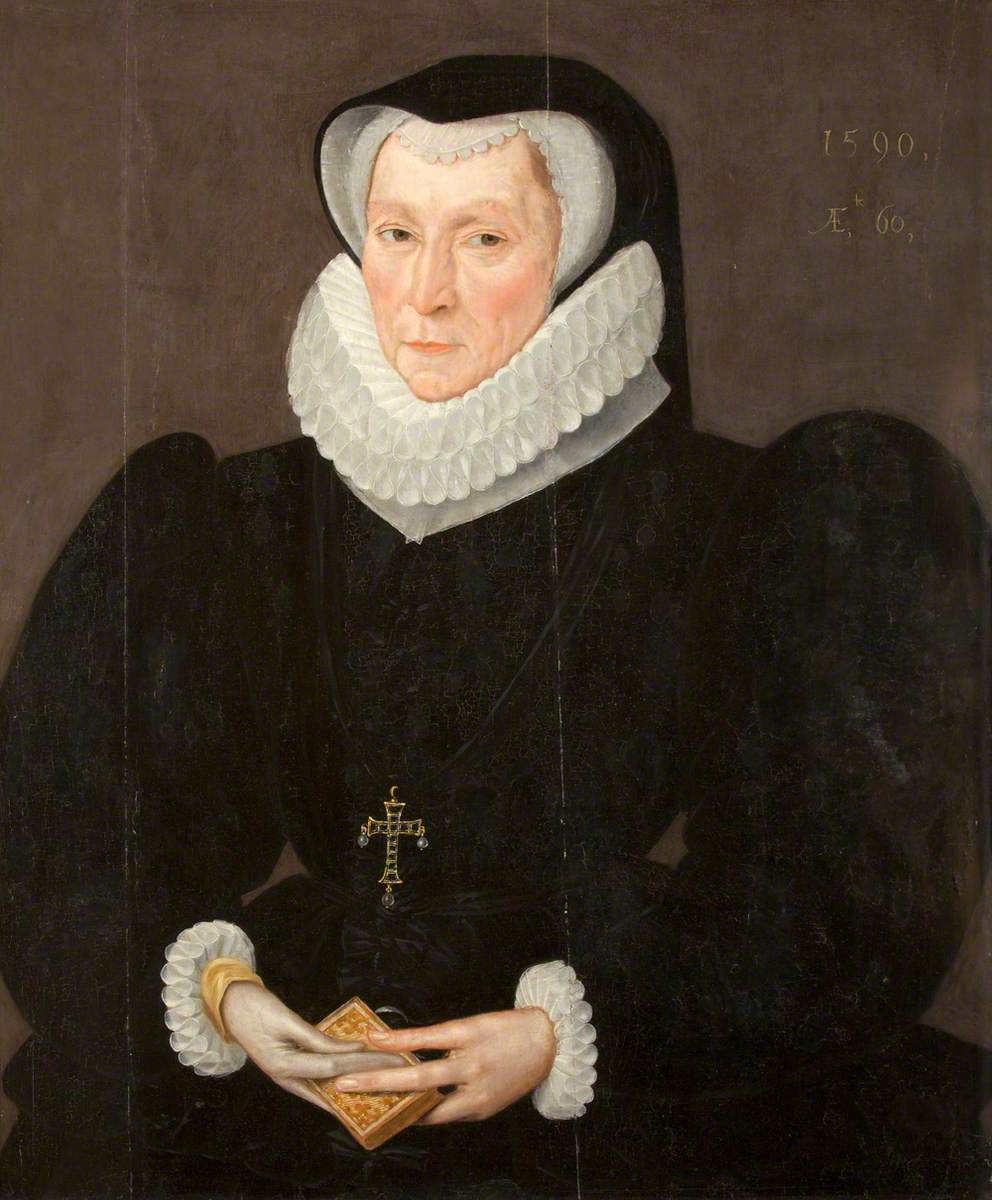
Portrait of Lady Catherine Neville (b.1529/1530), Lady Constable, Aged 60 by Robert Peake the Elder, 1590, located at Lytes Cary Manor, Somerset. It is inscribed on the upper right: 1590 aet 60. A half-length portrait of Catherine Constable, at the age of 60, facing, in black dress and hood, white ruff and cuffs, a gold prayer book in both hands.

He married secondly to Catherine (or Katherine) Neville (died 1591), daughter of Henry Neville, 5th Earl of Westmorland. Another portrait of Catherine by Robert Peake the Elder, dated 1590, resides at Burton Constable Hall.

His children included:

- Henry Constable (died 1607), who married Margaret Dormer.
- Joseph Constable of Upsall.
