= Christopher Atkinson Saville =

English merchant and politician

Christopher Atkinson (c. 1738 – 23 April 1819), from about 1798 known as Christopher Atkinson Savile or Saville, was an English merchant and politician.

Born in Yorkshire, Atkinson moved to London and married the niece of a corn merchant, entering that trade himself at the London Corn Exchange. At the 1780 general election Atkinson was elected as one of the two Members of Parliament for Hedon, but he was expelled from the House of Commons on 4 December 1783, after being convicted of perjury in his dealings with the Navy Victualling Board, and was sentenced to stand in the pillory.

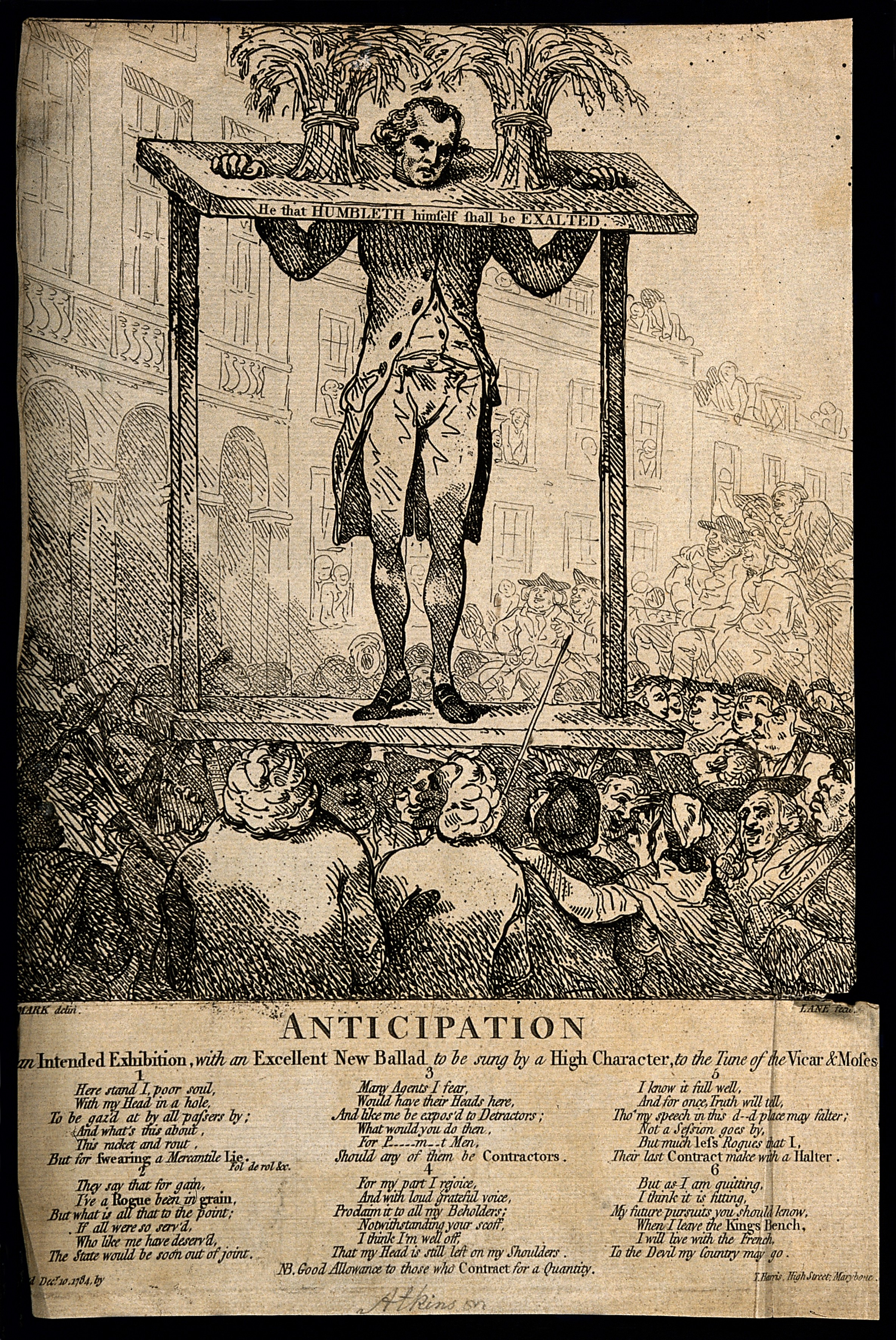
Christopher Atkinson pilloried as part of his sentence for cheating on the Navy Victualling Board, embellished with sheafs of corn amidst a huge crowd outside the corn exchange

Atkinson was granted a royal pardon in 1791, and was again returned to Parliament for Hedon in 1796, holding the seat until he stood down at the 1806 general election. He changed his name to Saville some time after 1798.

He then bought extensive properties in Okehampton in Devon, which gave him control of both parliamentary seats of the pocket borough of Okehampton, and at the election of 1807 he returned his son Albany Savile (1783-1831). He returned himself for Okehampton at the 1818 election, holding the seat until his death in April 1819, aged over eighty.

== Marriages and children ==
Atkinson’s first wife was Jane Constable, a daughter of John Constable and the aunt of the painter John Constable.

His second wife was Jane Savile, a daughter of John Savile (1712-1778). Their only son, Albany Savile, was the grandfather of Sir Leopold Halliday Savile. Albany was one of the members of parliament for the family’s borough of Okehampton between 1807 and 1820, briefly serving alongside his father as the borough’s other member.

Savile had an illegitimate son, Robert Farrand, who was one of the Members for Hedon in 1818–1820 and later a Member for Stafford in 1837.

== Relationship with John Constable ==
In his diary, Joseph Farington describes a dinner with John Constable in 1811 at which Savile was discussed:

John Constable spoke of Christopher Atkinson the Corn Merchant who formerly stood in the Pillory & gave him a very bad character as being a man whose sole object in this world is gain, and for it He wd. sacrifice every principle. Since the period of his standing in the Pillory for perjury, He has had a Cause depending in one of the Courts of Law, in which Mr. Dallas who was his Council and defended him upon the former occasion, in this held him up to public reprobation. He is however, said Constable, so hardened that reproach and shame have no effect upon him. Constable said, I am in a degree of relationship to him, he having married a relation of my Father. He is a native of Yorkshire, & came up to London to get bread as he could. He got into the House of a Corn Merchant Abraham Constable, a relation of our family, and by degrees obtained the whole business for Himself.

Parliament of Great Britain
Preceded by Beilby Thompson; Lewis Watson	Member of Parliament for Hedon; 1780–1783; With: William Chaytor	Succeeded by William Chaytor; Stephen Lushington
Preceded by Lionel Darell; Beilby Thompson	Member of Parliament for Hedon; 1796–1800; With: Lionel Darell	Succeeded by Parliament of the United Kingdom
Parliament of the United Kingdom
Preceded by Parliament of Great Britain	Member of Parliament for Hedon; 1801–1806; With: Lionel Darell to 1802; George Johnstone from 1802	Succeeded by George Johnstone; Anthony Browne
Preceded by Albany Savile; The Lord Graves	Member of Parliament for Okehampton; 1818–1819; With: Albany Savile	Succeeded by Albany Savile; The Lord Dunalley
