= Luke Robinson (MP, died 1773) =

English barrister and politician

Luke Robinson (died 1773) was an English barrister and politician.

He was the third son of Charles Robinson of Kingston upon Hull. He was educated at Gray's Inn, where he was called to the bar in 1722, and became a bencher in 1743.

He was elected at the 1741 general election as one of the two Members of Parliament (MPs) for Hedon. The defeated MP Harry Pulteney had him unseated on petition, and convicted of bribery at the York assizes.

Robisnson contested Hedon unsuccessfully at two subsequent by-elections, but his petition after the 1746 by-election was upheld, and he was awarded the seat in early 1747. He was returned again at general election in July 1747, and held the seat until his defeat in 1754.

Parliament of Great Britain
Preceded by Harry Pulteney; George Berkeley	Member of Parliament for Hedon; 1741–1742; With: Francis Chute	Succeeded by The Earl of Mountrath; George Berkeley
Preceded by George Anson; Samuel Gumley	Member of Parliament for Hedon; 1747–1754; With: George Anson to July 1747; Sir John Savile from July 1747	Succeeded by Sir Charles Saunders; Peter Denis
