= William Chaytor (MP) =

British politician

William Chaytor (11 January 1732 – 15 May 1819) was a British lawyer and politician who sat in the House of Commons from 1774 to 1790.

Born in Croft, Yorkshire, Chaytor was the son of Henry Chaytor and his wife Jane (née Smales). His grand-uncle was Sir William Chaytor, 1st and last Baronet (of the 1671 creation). He entered Magdalene College, Cambridge in 1750 and was admitted to Lincoln's Inn in 1753. He served as a Recorder of Richmond and sat as Member of Parliament for Penryn from 1774 to 1780 and Hedon from 1780 to 1790.

Chaytor married Jane Lee. Their son William, who was born before his parents' marriage, was created a Baronet in 1831 (see Chaytor baronets). Chaytor died in May 1819, aged 87.

== Notes ==
Parliament of Great Britain
Preceded by Hugh Pigot; William Lemon	Member of Parliament for Penryn; 1774–1780; With: Sir George Osborn, Bt	Succeeded by John Rogers; Sir Francis Basset, Bt
Preceded by Beilby Thompson; Lewis Watson	Member of Parliament for Hedon; 1780–1790; With: Christopher Atkinson 1780–1783; Stephen Lushington 1783–1784; Lionel Darell 1784–1790	Succeeded by Lionel Darell; Beilby Thompson
