= Henry Welby =

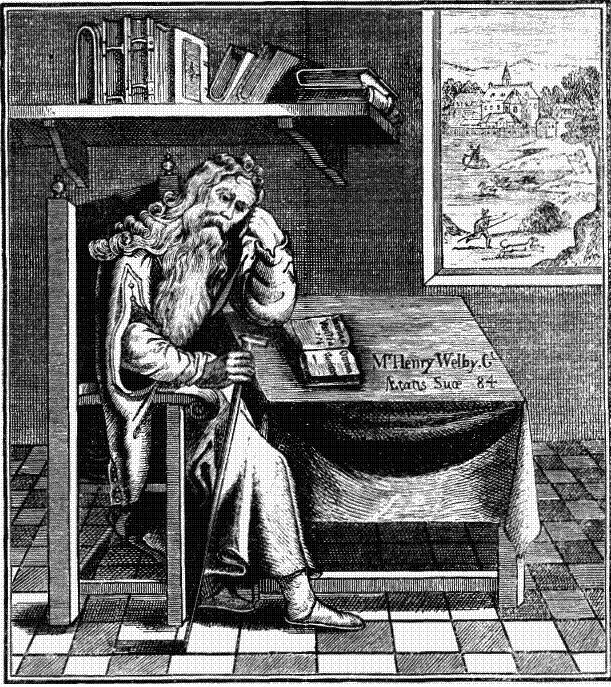
Illustration by William Marshall, in the biography of Welby

Henry Welby (buried 20 October 1636) was an English gentleman, known for living as a recluse for the last forty-four years of his life. A biography, The Phoenix of these late Times, was published in 1637.

== Life ==
Welby was the eldest son of Adlard Welby (died 11 August 1570) of Gedney, Lincolnshire and his first wife. He was matriculated as a pensioner of St John's College, Cambridge, on 24 May 1558, and was made a student of the Inner Temple in November 1562, "where, being accommodated with all the parts of a gentleman, hee after retyred himself into the countrye", purchasing the estate of Goxhill in Lincolnshire from Lord Wentworth. Wishing to enlarge his mind by travel, he "spent some few yeares in the Lowe Countreys, Germany, France, and Italy, making the best use of his time".

In this manner Welby continued his life until past middle age. About 1592 his younger half-brother, John, a dissolute youth, took umbrage at Henry's endeavours to reform his habits, and, after repeatedly threatening his life, attempted to shoot him with a pistol. Welby was deeply affected by this, and, taking "a very faire house in the lower end of Grub Street, near unto Cripplegate", he passed the rest of his life in absolute seclusion, never leaving his apartments or seeing anyone except his old maid-servant Elizabeth Villier. In this manner he lived for forty-four years, reading and praying, while being generous towards his poorer neighbours. During that period he ate neither fish nor meat, and never drank wine. He was buried in St Giles Cripplegate on 20 October 1636, nine days after the burial of his maid-servant. His age at death was shown on his monument, and in his biography, as eighty-four, but this is inconsistent with the dates relating to his education.

== Family ==
He married Alice, daughter of Thomas White of Wallingwells in Yorkshire and Nottinghamshire, and his wife Anne Cecil, sister of the first Lord Burghley. Welby and Alice had one daughter, Elizabeth, his sole heiress, who was married at St Giles Cripplegate on 13 July 1598 to Sir Christopher Hildyard of Winestead in Yorkshire. She was buried at Routh, East Riding of Yorkshire, on 28 November 1638. The family of Hildyard established at Flintham Hall, near Newark, are her descendants.

== Biography ==
A life so eccentric as that of Welby was the source of some notoriety, and in the year after his death a biography appeared entitled The Phoenix of these late Times, or the Life of Mr Henry Welby, Esq. It contained commemorative verses by Shackerley Marmion, John Taylor the water-poet, Thomas Heywood, Thomas Nabbes and others; the frontispiece was a portrait of Welby as he appeared in old age, engraved by William Marshall. Two editions, with no important differences, appeared in the same year. A new edition entitled The City-Hermit was published in 1741.
