= Thomas Alured =

English landowner and politician

- Born: 1583
- Died: 1638 (aged 54–55)
- Occupations: landowner and politician
- Known for: Member of Parliament for Hedon

Thomas Alured (1583 – May 1638) was an English landowner and politician who sat in the House of Commons from 1628 to 1629.

Alured was the son of John Aldred of Charterhouse, Hull. He was admitted as a scholar at Trinity College, Cambridge, at Easter 1602. He was admitted at Gray's Inn on 7 May 1604. From about 1606 he was private secretary to Ralph Eure, 3rd Baron Eure, and was given a number of further posts.

Alured initially held property at Ludlow, Shropshire and at Bewdley, Worcestershire but was later of Blackfriars, London and Edmonton, Middlesex. In 1628, he was elected Member of Parliament for Hedon and sat until 1629 when King Charles decided to rule without parliament for eleven years.

Alured died at the age of about 54 and was buried at St Anne's, Blackfriars.

Parliament of England
Preceded by Sir Thomas Fairfax of Walton; Sir Christopher Hilliard	Member of Parliament for Hedon; 1628–1629; With: Sir Christopher Hilliard	Parliament suspended until 1640
