= Matthew Boynton =

English landowner and politician (c.1591–1647)

Sir Matthew Boynton, 1st Baronet (c. 1591 – 12 March 1647) was an English landowner and politician who sat in the House of Commons in two parliaments between 1621 and 1647. He supported the Parliamentary cause in the English Civil War.

Boynton was the eldest son of Sir Francis Boynton of Barmston, who was High Sheriff of Yorkshire in 1596, and his wife Dorothy Place, daughter of Sir Christopher Place, of Halnaby, Yorkshire. He was baptised at Barmston on 26 January 1591. He was educated at St John's College, Cambridge, before being admitted at Lincoln's Inn. He succeeded his father on 9 April 1617. He was knighted, at Whitehall on 9 May 1618 and six days afterwards was created a baronet on 15 May 1618. In 1621 he was elected member of parliament for Hedon. He was Sheriff of Yorkshire in 1628.

On the outbreak of the Civil War, Boynton sided with the parliamentary side and aided in the capture of Sir John Hotham, who was planning to surrender Hull to the King. He was Sheriff of Yorkshire again from 1643 to 1644. He was Governor of Scarborough Castle and Colonel of a troop of horse. In 1645 he was elected MP for Scarborough as a recruiter to the Long Parliament.

Boynton died at Bainton in the East Riding of Yorkshire, and was buried on 12 March 1647, in the chancel of St. Andrew's, Holborn.

Boynton was married twice. His first marriage was to Frances Griffith, daughter of Sir Henry Griffith of Burton Agnes, by whom he had at least five children:

- Sir Francis Boynton (died 1695), who succeeded him in the baronetcy
- Colonel Matthew Boynton who was killed in the Battle of Wigan Lane, 1651
- Dorothy, who married John Anlaby of Etton
- Elizabeth, who married John Heron
- Margaret, who married John Robinson of Ryther

She died in July 1634 and he married secondly to Katherine Stapleton, widow of Robert Stapleton, of Wighill, Yorkshire and daughter of The Viscount Fairfax of Emley. She subsequently remarried to Sir Arthur Ingram, who died 4 July 1655 and then William Wiokham.

Parliament of England
Preceded by Christopher Hilliard; William Sheffield	Member of Parliament for Hedon; 1621–1622; With: Sir Thomas Fairfax of Walton	Succeeded by Sir Thomas Fairfax of Walton; Christopher Hilliard
Preceded by John Hotham the younger Sir Hugh Cholmeley	Member of Parliament for Scarborough; 1645–1647; With: Luke Robinson	Succeeded by Luke Robinson; John Anlaby
Honorary titles
Preceded by Sir Thomas Fairfax	High Sheriff of Yorkshire; 1628	Succeeded by Arthur Ingram, junior
Preceded by Sir Richard Hutton	High Sheriff of Yorkshire; 1643–1644	Succeeded by Sir John Bourchier
Baronetage of England
New creation	Baronet (of Barmston); 1618–1647	Succeeded by Francis Boynton
