= George Brooke alias Cobham =

George Brooke alias Cobham (1533-unknown), of London, was an English Member of Parliament (MP).

He was a Member of the Parliament of England for Hedon in 1555 and for Portsmouth in 1559.
