= Beilby Thompson =

British landowner and politician

Beilby Thompson (17 April 1742 – 10 June 1799) was a British landowner and politician, who sat in the House of Commons from 1768 to 1796.

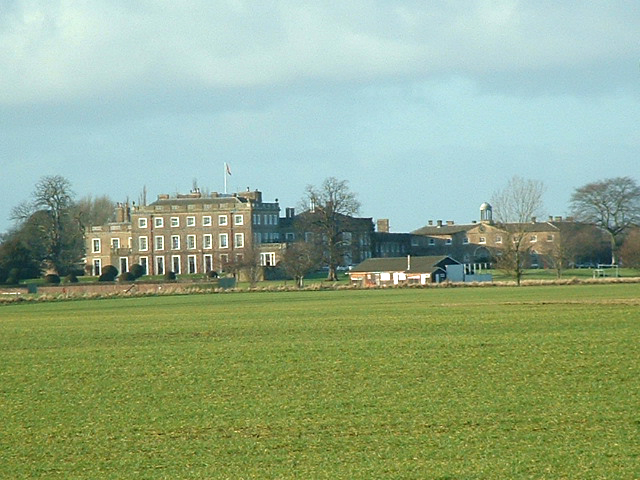
Escrick Hall- now a school

Beilby was the son of Beilby Thompson (died 1750) and Sarah Dawes (died 1773). The Thompsons were a prominent Yorkshire family; Beilby senior was High Sheriff of Yorkshire in 1730 and the son of Henry Thompson, MP.

On his father's death in 1750, Beilby, still a boy, inherited the family estate of Escrick, under the tutelage of his mother. He attended Cambridge between 1759 and 1764. Urged by Rockingham to stand for York (the seat once held by his grandfather) in 1768, his mother objected on grounds of expense. He was instead elected Member of Parliament for Hedon and held that seat until 1780, then for Thirsk until 1784. In 1784 he was a member of the St. Alban's Tavern group who tried to bring Fox and Pitt together. In 1790, he again represented Hedon, until 1796.

Beilby gradually bought up and relocated the village of Escrick to move it away from his house. Upon his death, unmarried, in 1799, Escrick passed to his brother Richard (died 1820), High Sheriff of Yorkshire in 1801, and then to their nephew Paul Beilby Lawley, who assumed the surname of Thompson.

Parliament of Great Britain
Preceded by Sir Charles Saunders; Peter Denis	Member of Parliament for Hedon; 1768–1780; With: Sir Charles Saunders 1768–1775; Lewis Watson 1776–1780	Succeeded by Christopher Atkinson; William Chaytor
Preceded by Sir Thomas Frankland, Bt; Thomas Frankland	Member of Parliament for Thirsk; 1780–1784; With: Sir Thomas Gascoigne, Bt	Succeeded by Sir Thomas Frankland, Bt; Sir Geoffrey Page-Turner, Bt
Preceded by William Chaytor; Sir Lionel Darell	Member of Parliament for Hedon; 1790–1796; With: Sir Lionel Darell, Bt	Succeeded by Sir Lionel Darell, Bt; Christopher Atkinson Savile
