= Christopher Hilliard =

English landowner and politician

Sir Christopher Hilliard or Hildyard (c. 1567 – November 1634) was an English landowner and politician who sat in the House of Commons at various times between 1589 and 1629.

Hilliard was the eldest son of Richard Hilliard of Routh, Yorkshire and his wife Jane Thweng, daughter of Marmaduke Thweng of Weaverthorpe. He was educated at St John's College, Cambridge in 1584 and entered Inner Temple in 1586. In 1589, he was elected Member of Parliament for Hedon. He was re-elected MP for Hedon in 1593 and 1597. He was a J.P. for the East Riding of Yorkshire by 1601. In 1601 he was re-elected MP for Hedon. He succeeded to the estates of his father and his uncle Christopher Hilliard in 1602. He was knighted in 1603 and was a member of the council in the north from July 1603 to November 1634. He was High Sheriff of Yorkshire from 1612 to 1613. In 1621 he was elected MP for Beverley. He was elected MP for Hedon again in 1624 and was re-elected in 1625 1626 and 1628, sitting until 1629 when King Charles decided to rule without parliament for eleven years.

Hilliard died at the age of about 66 and was buried at Winestead on 23 November 1634.

Hilliard married Elizabeth Welby, daughter of Henry Welby of Goxhill, Lincolnshire and his wife Alice White of Wallingwell on 13 July 1598. They had five sons and six daughters, including the politician Henry Hildyard and Sir Robert Hildyard, 1st Baronet.

Parliament of England
Preceded by Sir Henry Constable; John Hotham	Member of Parliament for Hedon; 1589–1611; With: John Alford 1589; Henry Brooke alias Cobham 1593; Thomas Salveyn 1597; Matthew Patteson 1601; Sir Henry Constable 1604–1610; John Digby 1611	Succeeded by William Sheffield; Clement Coke
Preceded by Edmund Scott; William Towse	Member of Parliament for Beverley; 1621–1622; With: Edmund Scott	Succeeded by Sir Henry Vane the elder Edmund Scott
Preceded by Sir Matthew Boynton, 1st Baronet; Sir Thomas Fairfax of Walton	Member of Parliament for Hedon; 1624–1629; With: Sir Thomas Fairfax of Walton 1624–1626; Thomas Alured 1628–1629	Parliament suspended until 1640
