= Hedon (constituency) =

Parliamentary constituency in the United Kingdom, 1801–1832

- Former borough constituency for the House of Commons

1547–1832
- Seats: Two

Hedon, sometimes spelt Heydon, was a parliamentary borough in the East Riding of Yorkshire, represented by two Members of Parliament in the House of Commons briefly in the 13th century and again from 1547 to 1832.

== History ==
The constituency consisted of the market town of Hedon, in Holderness to the east of Hull, which had been of some importance in medieval times but which by 1831 had dwindled to 217 houses and a population of 1,080, and the borough was disfranchised in the Reform Act 1832.

The right of election in Hedon was vested in the burgesses generally, meaning that a high proportion of the male population had the vote. In 1826, when the election was contested, 331 burgesses recorded their votes. Nevertheless, the result was rarely in doubt, Hedon being a classic example of a pocket borough where the influence of the landowner or "patron" was substantial if not absolute. At first the influence seems to have been shared between two families of important local landowners, the Constables of Burton Constable and the Hildyards of Winestead. The patron at the start of the 18th century was Henry Guy; he bequeathed it to his protégé William Pulteney, who not only sat for the borough himself for much of his career but made the other seat available to his cousin and his brother. After Pulteney's death the borough passed to the distinguished admiral Lord Anson, who used his patronage to provide seats for some of his naval colleagues; one of these, Admiral Sir Charles Saunders, inherited the patronage in turn when Anson died.

== Members of Parliament ==
=== MPs 1547–1640 ===
Parliament	First member	Second member
1547	Edward Elrington	Robert Googe
1553 (Mar)	Sir John Constable	Robert Shakerley
1553 (Oct)	Sir John Constable	Robert Shakerley
1554 (Apr)	Hon. Sir Thomas Wharton	Richard Cuthbert
1554 (Nov)	John Long	Richard Cuthbert
1555	George Brooke alias Cobham	Richard Cuthbert
1558	Sir John Constable	John Goldwell
1558/9	John Vaughan	John Salveyn
1562/3	Sir John Constable	Christopher Hilliard
1571	Christopher Hilliard	William Paler
1572	Christopher Hilliard	John Moore
1584 (Oct)	Sir Henry Constable	Fulke Greville
1586 (Oct)	Sir Henry Constable	John Hotham
1588 (Oct)	John Alford	Christopher Hilliard
1593	Henry Brooke alias Cobham II	Christopher Hilliard
1597 (Sep)	Thomas Salveyn	Christopher Hilliard
1601 (Oct)	Matthew Patteson	Christopher Hilliard
1604	Christopher Hilliard	Sir Henry Constable, replaced 1610 by John Digby
1614	Christopher Hilliard	Clement Coke, sat for Clitheroe replaced by William Sheffield
1621	Sir Matthew Boynton, Bt	Sir Thomas Fairfax of Walton
1624	Sir Thomas Fairfax of Walton	Christopher Hilliard
1625	Sir Thomas Fairfax of Walton	Christopher Hilliard
1626	Sir Thomas Fairfax of Walton	Christopher Hilliard
1628	Sir Christopher Hilliard	Thomas Alured
1629–1640	No Parliaments summoned	

=== MPs 1640–1832 ===
Year	First member	First party	Second member	Second party
April 1640	John Alured	Parliamentarian	Sir Philip Stapleton	
November 1640	John Alured	Parliamentarian	Sir William Strickland	Parliamentarian
1651	Alured died 1651, seat vacant thereafter		Sir William Strickland	Parliamentarian
1653	Hedon was unrepresented in the Barebones Parliament and the First and Second Parliaments of the Protectorate			
January 1659	Thomas Strickland		Colonel Matthew Alured	
May 1659	Sir William Strickland		One seat vacant	
April 1660	Sir John Cloberry		Sir Hugh Bethell	
July 1660	Henry Hildyard		Sir Hugh Bethell	
1661	Sir Matthew Appleyard		Sir Hugh Bethell	
1670	Henry Guy		Sir Hugh Bethell	
1680	Henry Guy		William Boynton	
1685	Henry Guy		Charles Duncombe	Tory
1689	Henry Guy		Matthew Appleyard (younger)	
October 1695	Lord Spencer		Sir William Trumbull	
December 1695	Thomas Frankland		Hugh Bethell	
1698	Anthony Duncombe		Hugh Bethell	
January 1701	Anthony Duncombe		Sir Robert Bedingfield	
December 1701	Anthony Duncombe		Sir Robert Hildyard	
July 1702	Sir Charles Duncombe	Tory	Henry Guy	
November 1702	Anthony Duncombe		Henry Guy	
1705	Anthony Duncombe		William Pulteney	Whig
1708	Hugh Cholmley	Whig	William Pulteney	Whig
March 1722	Daniel Pulteney	Whig	William Pulteney	Whig
November 1722	Harry Pulteney	Whig	William Pulteney	Whig
1734	Sir Francis Boynton		George Berkeley	
1739	Harry Pulteney	Whig	George Berkeley	
1741	Francis Chute		Luke Robinson	
1742	The Earl of Mountrath	Whig	George Berkeley	
1744	George Anson		George Berkeley	
1746	George Anson		Samuel Gumley	
February 1747	George Anson		Luke Robinson	
July 1747	Sir John Savile		Luke Robinson	
1754	Captain Sir Charles Saunders, RN		Captain Peter Denis, RN	
1768	Captain Sir Charles Saunders, RN		Beilby Thompson	
1776	Hon. Lewis Watson		Beilby Thompson	
1780	Christopher Atkinson		William Chaytor	
1783	Stephen Lushington	Foxite Whig	William Chaytor	
1784	Lionel Darell		William Chaytor	
1790	Lionel Darell		Beilby Thompson	
1796	Lionel Darell		Christopher Atkinson	
1802	George Johnstone		Christopher Atkinson	
1806	George Johnstone		Anthony Browne	
1813	John Broadhurst	Whig	Anthony Browne	
1818	Edmund Turton		Robert Farrand	Whig
1820	John Baillie	Tory	Robert Farrand	Whig
1826	John Baillie	Tory	Thomas Hyde Villiers	Whig
1830	Sir Thomas Clifford-Constable, Bt	Tory	Robert Farrand	Tory
