= Matthew Appleyard (died 1670) =

English military commander

Sir Matthew Appleyard (c. 1607 – 20 February 1670), also spelt Mathew, was an English military commander.

== Biography ==
Appleyard was the son of Thomas Appleyard, the descendant of a family whose residence for several generations was Burstwick Hall Garth, in the East Riding of Yorkshire. His mother was his father's second wife, Elizabeth Turner, née Monkton. In the English Civil War, he took the side of the royalists, and was knighted on the field by Charles I. On the taking of Leicester, the king "presently made Sir Mathew Appleyard, a soldier of known courage and experience, his lieutenant governor." He married Frances, daughter of the third Sir William Pelham, of Brocklesby, Lincolnshire; sat in the House of Commons of England as member for the corporation of Hedon from 1661; was one of his majesty's customers for the port of Kingston-upon-Hull; was a firm supporter of Church and State, and died in 1669 in the 63rd year of his age.

His son Matthew (c. 1660–1700) was also an MP for Hedon.

Parliament of England
Preceded by Sir Hugh Bethell; Henry Hildyard	Member of Parliament for Hedon; 1661–1670; With: Sir Hugh Bethell	Succeeded by Sir Hugh Bethell; Henry Guy
