= Harry Pulteney =

English soldier and Member of Parliament

Arms of Pulteney: Argent, a fess dancettée gules in chief three leopard's faces sable

General Harry Pulteney (14 February 1686 – 26 October 1767) was an English soldier and Member of Parliament.

He was the younger son of Colonel William Pulteney, of Misterton in Leicestershire, and Mary Floyd. His elder brother, William was one of the leading English statesmen of the 18th century and was eventually created Earl of Bath; he had inherited the family fortune including considerable estates in what is now central London, and also the parliamentary borough of Hedon in Yorkshire.

Harry entered Parliament in as member for Hedon in 1722. His brother William had already been its MP for 17 years, and had offered the second seat to his cousin, Daniel Pulteney; but as Daniel was also elected for the (more prestigious) constituency of Preston, this left a vacancy which Harry was able to fill (William continuing to hold the other seat). He was MP for Hedon until 1734, and again from 1739 to 1741, and also represented Hull for three years from 1744, and was also for a period Governor of Hull.

In 1739 Pulteney became colonel of the 13th Regiment of Foot, which as was the custom of the time was consequently referred to as Pulteney's Regiment. Under his command the regiment served at Dettingen, Fontenoy and during the Jacobite Rebellion at Falkirk and Culloden. Later they took part in the road-building programme in the Scottish Highlands, and the regiment's officers were among those unsuccessfully investigating the famous Appin murder of 1752. Pulteney was promoted to major-general in 1743, lieutenant-general in 1747 and to general in 1765.

Pulteney was his brother's heir and inherited his fortune on his death in 1764, but he himself died on 26 October 1767 at the age of 81. He was buried in Westminster Abbey.

Parliament of Great Britain
Preceded by William Pulteney; Daniel Pulteney	Member of Parliament for Hedon; 1722–1734; With: William Pulteney	Succeeded by Sir Francis Boynton; George Berkeley
Preceded by Sir Francis Boynton; George Berkeley	Member of Parliament for Hedon; 1739–1741; With: George Berkeley	Succeeded by Francis Chute; Luke Robinson
Preceded by George Crowle; William Carter	Member of Parliament for Kingston upon Hull; 1744–1747; With: George Crowle	Succeeded by Lord Robert Manners; Thomas Carter
Military offices
Preceded by John Middleton	Colonel of the 13th Regiment of Foot; 1739–1766	Succeeded by The Duke of Gloucester
Preceded by James Dormer	Governor of Kingston-upon-Hull; 1743–1766	Succeeded by Philip Honywood
