= William Pulteney, 1st Earl of Bath =

English politician and peer (1684–1764)

The Right Honourable The Earl of Bath PC
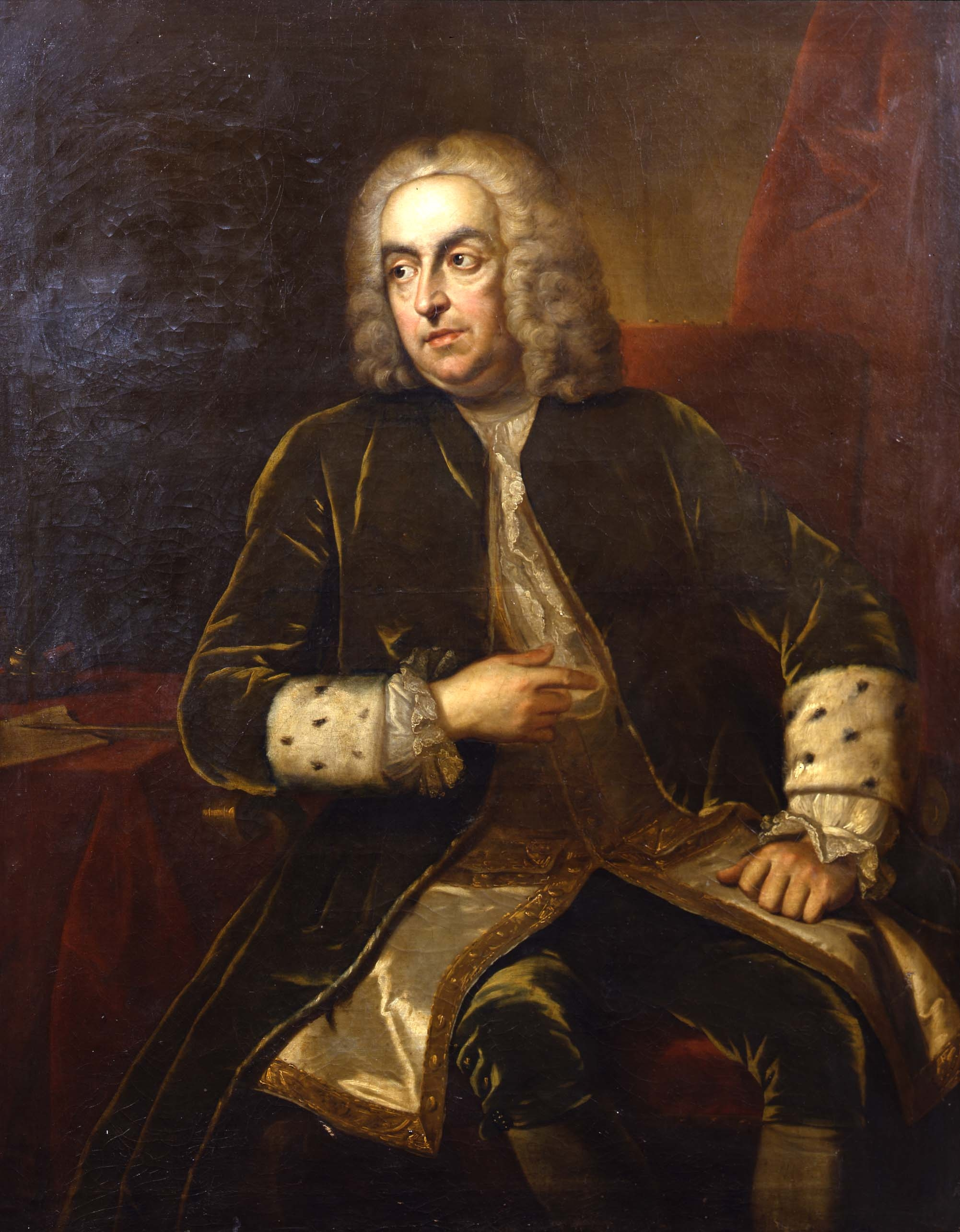
- Lord Bath, c. 1740s

Prime Minister of Great Britain
- Disputed
- In office 10 February 1746 – 12 February 1746
- Monarch: George II
- Preceded by: Henry Pelham
- Succeeded by: Henry Pelham

Secretary at War
- In office 1714–1717
- Monarch: George I
- Preceded by: Francis Gwyn
- Succeeded by: James Craggs the Younger

Personal details
- Born: William Pulteney; 22 March 1684 Leicestershire, England
- Died: 7 July 1764 (aged 80)
- Resting place: Westminster Abbey
- Party: Whig
- Spouse: Anna Maria Gumley (m. 1714; died 1758)
- Children: William Pulteney, Viscount Pulteney
- Education: Christ Church, Oxford
- Occupation: Politician
- Cabinet: Short-lived ministry

Arms of Pulteney: Argent, a fess dancettée gules in chief three leopard's faces sable

William Pulteney, 1st Earl of Bath, PC (22 March 1684 – 7 July 1764) was an English Whig politician and peer who sat in the British House of Commons from 1707 to 1742 when he was raised to the peerage as the Earl of Bath by George II of Great Britain. He is sometimes represented as having served as First Lord of the Treasury and Prime Minister of Great Britain as part of the short-lived ministry in 1746, although most modern sources do not consider him to have held the office.

== Background and early career ==
The son of William Pulteney by his first wife, Mary Floyd, he was born in March 1684 into an old Leicestershire family. He was educated at Westminster School and at Christ Church, Oxford, matriculating on 31 October 1700. He acquired extensive classical education, and on leaving Oxford made the usual tour on Continental Europe. In 1705, he was brought into parliament by Henry Guy (former secretary of the Treasury) for the Yorkshire borough of Hedon. This seat was held by him without a break until 1734.

Throughout the reign of Queen Anne, William Pulteney played a prominent part in the struggles of the Whigs, and was involved in the prosecution of Henry Sacheverell. When the victorious Tories sent his friend Robert Walpole to the Tower of London in 1712, Pulteney championed his cause in the House of Commons and with the leading Whigs visited him in prison.

== Ministerial offices ==
Pulteney was Secretary at War from 1714 to 1717 in the first ministry of George I, and was on the committee of secrecy on the Treaty of Utrecht, formed in April 1715. Two years later, on 6 July 1716, he became one of the privy council. When Townshend was dismissed, in April 1717, from his post of Lord Lieutenant of Ireland, and Walpole resigned, they were followed in their retirement by Pulteney.

The crash of the South Sea Company restored Walpole to the highest position, but all he offered to Pulteney was a peerage. Pulteney rejected the offer, but in May 1723 Pulteney agreed to accept the lucrative but insignificant post of Cofferer of the Household. However, when he found himself neglected, he opposed the proposition of Walpole to discharge the debts of the civil list, and in April 1725 was dismissed from his sinecure.

Pulteney was one of the original backers of the Royal Academy of Music, establishing a London opera company which commissioned numerous works from George Frideric Handel, Giovanni Bononcini and others. He was a member of the Hanover Club.

== Patriot Whigs ==
From the day of his dismissal to that of his ultimate triumph, Pulteney remained in opposition, forming the Patriot Whigs, a group of fellow Whigs who felt that Walpole was corrupt and tyrannical. Walpole's attempt's 1730 at conciliation with the offer of Townshend's place and of a peerage was spurned. Pulteney's resentment was not confined to his speeches in parliament.

With Henry St John, 1st Viscount Bolingbroke he started, in December 1726, a periodical called The Craftsman, and in its pages the minister was incessantly denounced for many years. John Hervey, 2nd Baron Hervey published an attack on the Craftsman, and Pulteney, either openly or behind the person of Nicholas Amhurst, its editor, replied to the attack. Whether the question at issue was the civil list, the excise, the income of the Prince of Wales, or the state of domestic affairs, Pulteney was ready with a pamphlet, and the minister or one of his friends came out with a reply.

For his "Proper reply to a late scurrilous libel" (Craftsman, 1731), an answer to "Sedition and defamation displayed," he was challenged to a duel by Lord Hervey; for another, "An answer to one part of an infamous libel entitled remarks on the Craftsman's indication of his two honourable patrons," he was in July 1731 struck off the roll of privy councillors and dismissed from the commission of the peace in several counties.

In print, Pulteney was inferior to Bolingbroke alone among the antagonists of Walpole, but in parliament, from which Bolingbroke was excluded, he excelled. When the sinking fund was appropriated in 1733 he led the denunciation; when the excise scheme in the same year was stirring popular feeling to its lowest depths the passion of the multitude broke out in his oratory. Walpole managed to avoid the fall of his ministry. Bolingbroke withdrew to France on the suggestion, it is said, of Pulteney, and the opposition was weakened by the dissensions of the leaders.

From the general election of 1734 until his elevation to the peerage, Pulteney sat for Middlesex. For some years after this election the minister's assailants made little progress in their attack, but in 1738 the troubles with Spain supplied them with the opportunity which they desired. Walpole long argued for peace, but he was feebly supported by his own cabinet, and the frenzy of the people for war knew no bounds. In an evil moment for his own reputation, Walpole consented to remain in office and to gratify popular passion with a war against Spain. His downfall was not long deferred. The War of Jenkins' Ear was declared in 1739, a new parliament was summoned in the summer of 1741, and over the divisions on the election petitions the ministry of Walpole collapsed.

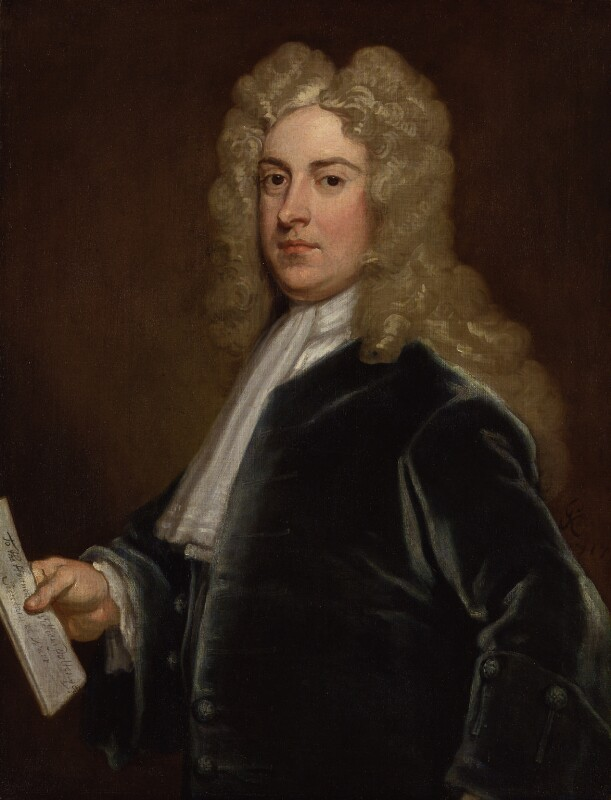
William Pulteney, 1st Earl of Bath

The task of forming the new administration was after some delay entrusted to Pulteney, who offered the post of First Lord of the Treasury (Prime Minister) to the Earl of Wilmington, and contented himself with a seat in the cabinet and a peerage, still hoping to retain his supremacy in the ministry. This made him unpopular, and his influence dwindled to nothing.

Horace Walpole asserts that when Pulteney wished to withdraw from the peerage, it was forced upon him by George II of Great Britain. Another chronicler of the times records that when Walpole and Pulteney met in the House of Lords, the one as Earl of Orford, the other as Earl of Bath, the remark was made by Orford: "Here we are, my lord, the two most insignificant fellows in England." On 14 July 1742 Pulteney was created Baron Pulteney of Heydon, Viscount Pulteney of Wrington, Somerset, and Earl of Bath. On 20 February he had been restored to his rank in the privy council. At Wilmington's death in 1743 he made application to George II for the post of First Lord of the Treasury, only to find that it had been conferred on Henry Pelham.

== Prime minister ==
On 10 February 1746, Pelham's administration resigned en masse, and the king turned to Bath to form an alternative ministry. He accepted the seals of office and made nominations to the most senior posts, but it quickly became clear that he did not have enough support to form a viable government, and after "48 hours, three quarters, seven minutes, and eleven seconds" he abandoned the attempt, forcing the king to accept Pelham's terms for resuming office. As the office of Prime Minister did not then officially exist, it is a matter of controversy whether Bath should be considered to have been Prime Minister by virtue of his two-day ministry.

Bath's failed attempt to form a government brought him much ridicule. Horace Walpole recorded the joke that "Granville and Bath were met going about the streets, calling 'Odd Man', as the hackney chairmen do when they want a partner", and a contemporary pamphlet satirically praised him for "the most wise and honest of all administrations, the minister having ... never transacted one rash thing; and, what is more marvellous, left as much money in the T[reasur]y as he found in it."

== Death and legacy ==
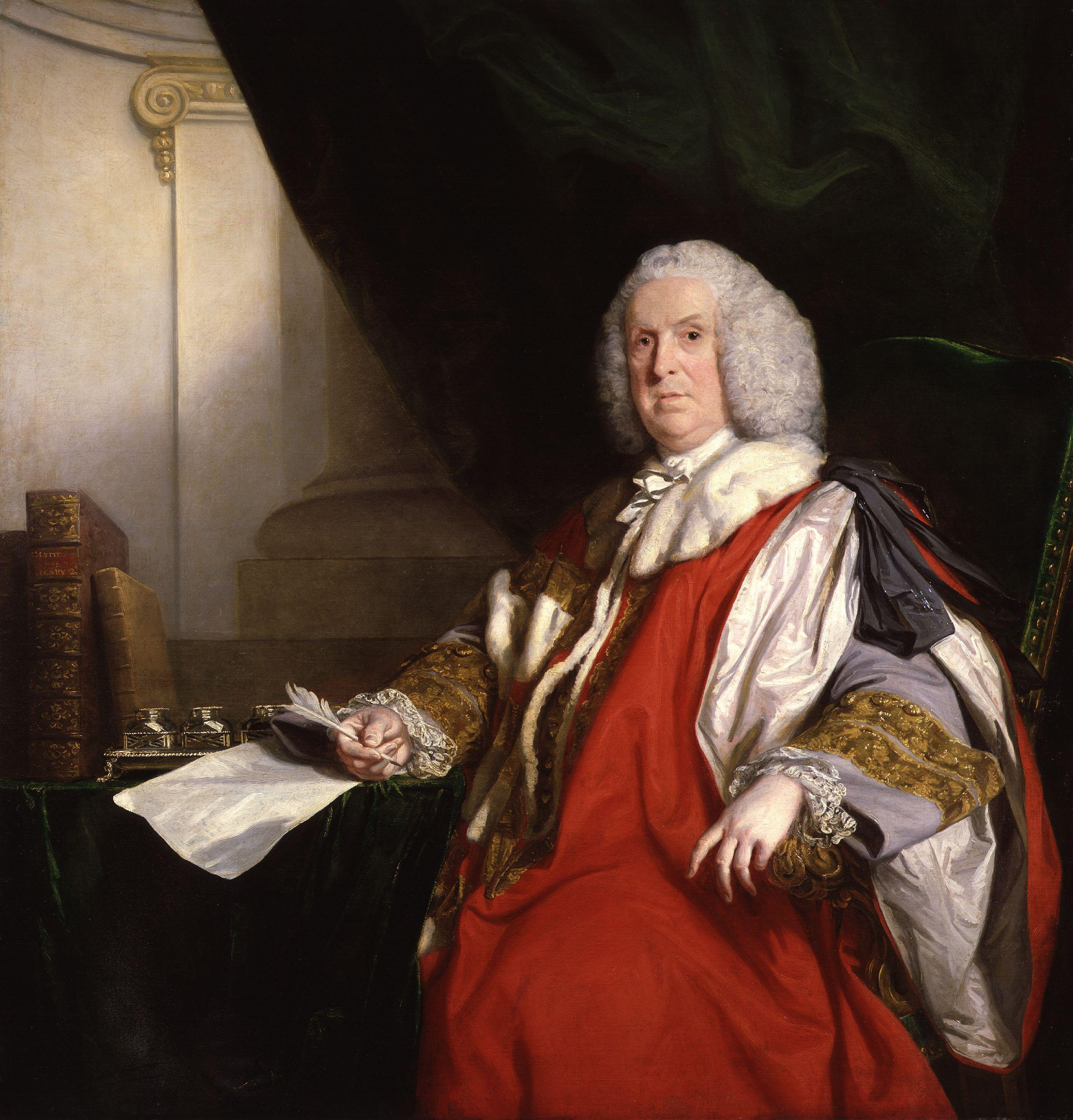
Lord Bath by Joshua Reynolds, 1761

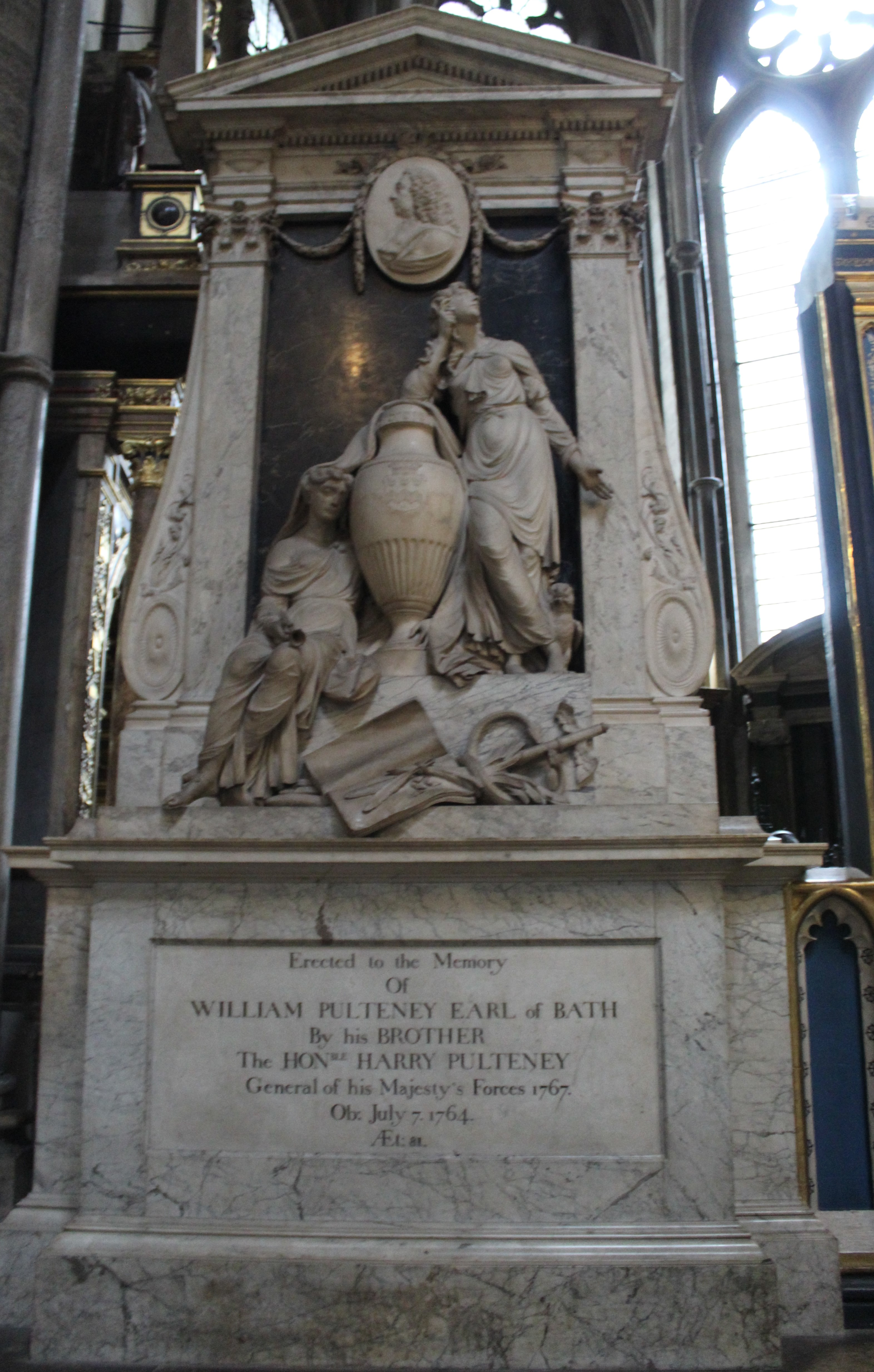
Pulteney monument, Westminster Abbey

An occasional pamphlet and an infrequent speech were afterwards the sole fruits of Bath's talents. His praises whilst in retirement have been sung by two bishops, Zachary Pearce and Thomas Newton. In 1762, two years before his death, he served as treasurer of the Salop Infirmary in Shrewsbury. He was buried on 17 July 1764, in his own vault in Islip chapel, Westminster Abbey. The monument is by the sculptor Joseph Wilton.

He married on 27 December 1714 Anna Maria, daughter and co-heiress of John Gumley of Isleworth, commissary general to the army who was often satirized by the wits of the day (Notes and Queries, 3rd S. iI. 40 2-403, ~ 490). Anna Maria was the aunt of Rev. Dr. John Lockman, Canon of Windsor. She died on 14 September 1758, and their only son William Pulteney died unmarried at Madrid on 12 February 1763. Pulteney's vast fortune passed in 1767 to Frances, wife of William Johnstone and daughter and co-heiress of his cousin, Daniel Pulteney, a bitter antagonist of Walpole in parliament, who had taken the name of Pulteney.

Of business he was never fond, and the loss in 1734 of his trusted friend John Merrill, who had supplied the qualities which he lacked, was lamented by him in a letter to Jonathan Swift.

The town of Poultney, Vermont and the Poultney River were named for him.

== Cabinet of Lord Bath ==
Portfolio	Minister	Took office	Left office
First Lord of the Treasury	William Pulteney, 1st Earl of Bath (head of ministry)	10 February 1746	12 February 1746
Lord Privy Seal	Henry Howard, 4th Earl of Carlisle	10 February 1746	12 February 1746
First Lord of the Admiralty	Daniel Finch, 8th Earl of Winchilsea	10 February 1746	12 February 1746
Secretary of State for the Northern Department (Note: Carteret was the sole person to receive the seals of Secretary of State before the collapse of the ministry but intended to manage the Northern Department had the ministry remained in place.)	John Carteret, 2nd Earl Granville (head of ministry)	10 February 1746	12 February 1746

== Bibliography ==
- William Coxe, Memoirs of Sir Robert Walpole (1816), and of Henry Pelham (1829)
- John Morley, Walpole (1889)
- Walter Sichel, Bolingbroke (1901–1902)
- Archibald Ballantyne, Carteret (1887)
- Eng. Hist. Rev. iv. 749-753
- and the general political memoirs of the time.

== Notes ==
Parliament of England
Preceded by Henry Guy; Anthony Duncombe	Member of Parliament for Hedon; 1705–1707; With: Anthony Duncombe	Succeeded by Parliament of Great Britain
Parliament of Great Britain
Preceded by Parliament of England	Member of Parliament for Hedon; 1707–1734; With: Anthony Duncombe 1707–1708; Hugh Cholmley 1708–1721; Daniel Pulteney 1721–1722; Harry Pulteney 1722–1734	Succeeded by George Berkeley; Sir Francis Boynton, Bt
Preceded by James Bertie; Sir Francis Child	Member of Parliament for Middlesex; 1734–1742; With: Sir Francis Child 1734–1740; Hugh Smithson 1740–1742	Succeeded by Hugh Smithson; Sir Roger Newdigate, Bt
Political offices
Preceded by The Earl of Godolphin	Cofferer of the Household; 1723–1725	Succeeded by The Earl of Lincoln
Preceded by Henry Pelham	— DISPUTED — First Lord of the Treasury; 10–12 February 1746	Succeeded by Henry Pelham
Honorary titles
Preceded by The 5th Viscount of Irvine	Lord Lieutenant of the East Riding of Yorkshire; 1721–1728	Succeeded by The 6th Viscount of Irvine
Preceded by The Earl of Burlington	Custos Rotulorum of the East Riding of Yorkshire; 1721–1728	Succeeded by The 6th Viscount of Irvine
Preceded by The Earl of Powis	Lord Lieutenant of Shropshire; 1761–1764	Succeeded by The Earl of Powis
Peerage of Great Britain
New creation	Earl of Bath; 1742–1764	Extinct
