= Henry Guy (politician) =

English politician (1631–1710)

Henry Guy (16 June 1631 – 23 February 1710) was an English landowner, lawyer, courtier, and member of parliament.

== Early life ==
Guy, the only son of Henry Guy by his wife Elizabeth, a daughter of Francis Wethered of Ashlyns, Great Berkhampstead, was born in that parish on 16 June 1631. His father died in 1640, his mother in 1690, aged 90, when she was buried in the chancel of Tring Church, and her son erected a monument to her memory.

Henry Guy was admitted at the Inner Temple in November 1652. He spent some time at Christ Church, Oxford, and was created M.A. in full convocation on 28 September 1663.

== Career ==
Guy held an excise office in the north of England, where he ingratiated himself with the electors of the borough of Hedon in Yorkshire. He was admitted as a free burgess of Hedon on 2 August 1669 and on 8 March 1670 was elected as one of its two Members of Parliament, continuing to represent it until arrested in 1695. He again sat for it from 1702 till 1705, when his parliamentary career ended. In 1693 he commissioned Hedon Town Hall and presented it to the corporation of the borough. In the House of Commons, Guy spoke for the party of the Earl of Sunderland.

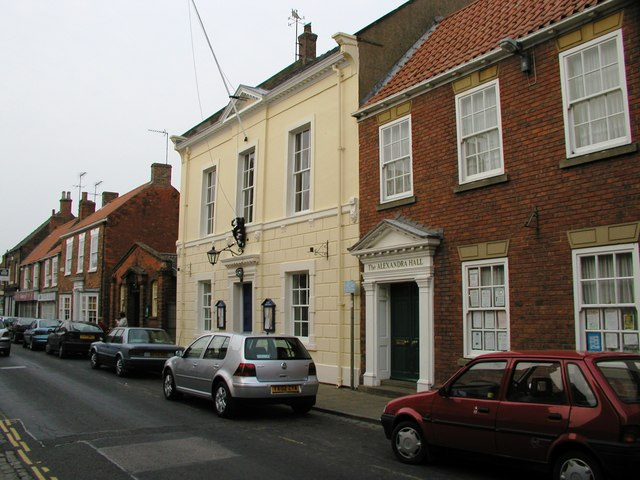
Hedon Town Hall, next to Alexandra Hall; financed by Henry Guy.

His first appointment about the court was to the post of cupbearer to the queen, but he was soon admitted among the boon companions of Charles II. On the resignation in 1675 of Colonel Silas Titus, he became Groom of the Bedchamber, but sold his office by November 1679 to Thomas Neale. In March 1679 he was appointed secretary to the Treasury, and the payments from the public funds passed through his hands until Christmas 1688. John Yonge Akerman edited, from a manuscript in the possession of William Selby Lowndes, for the Camden Society in 1851, as vol. lii. of their publications, details of secret service funds of Charles II and James II from 30 March 1679 to 25 December 1688; it was an account rendered by Guy some time after the accession of William III. In the Correspondence of Henry, Earl of Clarendon (ed. 1828) are particulars of sums paid to him for secret service money for one year, to 7 March 1688.

On the death of Henrietta Maria in 1669 Guy obtained a grant of the manor of Great Tring, and on the estate he built, from the design of Sir Christopher Wren, a house and gardens. This property he sold in 1702. In 1680 he acquired from Catherine of Braganza a lease for thirty years of the manor of Hemel Hempstead, and in 1686 some lands in Ireland were ordered by the king's letter to be transferred to him. In 1686 he was also residuary legatee to Thomas Naylor, a man of much wealth, who was buried in Westminster Abbey on 12 Nov. 1686. William III dined with him at Tring in June 1690.

In March 1691 he was made a commissioner of customs, but in the following June returned to the secretaryship of the treasury. His displacement was talked of in February 1695, and when the charge of having accepted a bribe was brought home to him, he was forced to resign and was committed to the Tower (16 February). In 1696 he guaranteed, with many other members of his party, a loan from the Dutch government of £300,000.

Guy died on 23 February 1710 aged 78. He left £500 a year and £40,000 in cash to William Pulteney, who succeeded him as MP for Hedon.

Parliament of England
Preceded by Sir Hugh Bethell; Sir Matthew Appleyard	Member of Parliament for Hedon; 1670–1695; With: Sir Hugh Bethell to 1680; William Boynton 1680–1685; Charles Duncombe 1685–1689; Matthew Appleyard (younger) 1689–1695	Succeeded by Sir William Trumbull; Lord Spencer
Preceded by Anthony Duncombe; Sir Robert Hildyard, Bt	Member of Parliament for Hedon; 1702–1705; With: Charles Duncombe 1702; Anthony Duncombe from 1702	Succeeded by Anthony Duncombe; William Pulteney
