= E. T. S. Appleyard =

Edgar Thomas Snowden Appleyard (14 June 1904 – 15 June 1939) was a physicist and pioneer in the fields of thin films and superconductivity.

== Biography ==
He was born on 14 June 1904, the son of Edgar Snowden Appleyard and Elizabeth Whitehead of Huddersfield, England.

Appleyard attended Almondbury Grammar School and then was admitted to the Cambridge as a King’s College scholar. In the Natural Science Tripos he selected Physics as one of the key science subjects to focus his interest. He spent several years on research in the Cavendish Laboratory. In 1929 at the University of Bristol's H.H. Wills Physics Laboratory, Appleyard received an appointment to a George Wills research associateship. At the University of Chicago for the 1931–1932 academic year, Appleyard was awarded with a Rockefeller fellowship.

Appleyard died on 15 June 1939 through injuries caused by a fall.

== Noteworthy collaborators ==
- H. W. B. Skinner
- John J. Hopfield
- A.C.B. Lovell
- A. D. Misener
- Heinz London

== Research interests ==
- Excitation of polarized light
- Preparation of Schumann plates
- Thin metal films: Conductivity, Resistance
- Superconductivity

== Select publications ==
- Appleyard, E. T. S.; Skinner, H. W. B. (1927). "A Case of Double Reflexion". Mathematical Proceedings of the Cambridge Philosophical Society. 23 (8): 951. Bibcode:1927PCPS...23..951A. doi:10.1017/s0305004100013839. S2CID 170755304.
- Skinner, H. W. B.; E. T. S. Appleyard (1927). "On the Excitation of Polarised Light by Electron Impact. II. Mercury". Proceedings of the Royal Society of London. Series A (117.776): 224–244. Bibcode:1927RSPSA.117..224S. doi:10.1098/rspa.1927.0177.
- E. T. S. Appleyard (1930). "Experiments on the Excitation of Light by Low Voltage Positive Rays". Proceedings of the Royal Society of London. Series A (128.807): 330–344. Bibcode:1930RSPSA.128..330A. doi:10.1098/rspa.1930.0112.
- Appleyard, E. T. S. "Electronic Structure of the a-X Band System of N_{2}." Physical Review 41.2 (1932): 254.
- Hopfield, J. J.; E. T. S. Appleyard (1932). "A Simplified Method of Preparing Schumann Plates". JOSA. 22 (9): 488–495. Bibcode:1932JOSA...22..488H. doi:10.1364/josa.22.000488.
- Appleyard, E. T. S. (1937). "Some factors influencing the resistance of thin metal films". Proceedings of the Physical Society. 49 (4S): 118–135. Bibcode:1937PPS....49..118A. doi:10.1088/0959-5309/49/4s/314.
- Appleyard, E. T. S. "Discussion of the papers by Finch, Appleyard and Lennard-Jones." Proceedings of the Physical Society 49.4S (1937): 151.
- Appleyard, E. T. S.; A. C. B. Lovell (1937). "The Electrical Conductivity of Thin Metallic Films. II. Caesium and Potassium on Pyrex Glass Surfaces". Proceedings of the Royal Society of London. Series A-Mathematical and Physical Sciences (158.895): 718–728. Bibcode:1937RSPSA.158..718A. doi:10.1098/rspa.1937.0050.
- Appleyard, E. T. S.; A. D. Misener (1938). "Superconductivity of Thin Films of Mercury". Nature. 142 (3593): 474. Bibcode:1938Natur.142..474A. doi:10.1038/142474a0. S2CID 4025737.
- Appleyard, E. T. S.; Bristow, J. R.; London, H. & Misener, A. D. (1939). "Superconductivity of thin films. I. Mercury". Proceedings of the Royal Society of London. Series A. Mathematical and Physical Sciences (172.951): 540–558. Bibcode:1939RSPSA.172..540A. doi:10.1098/rspa.1939.0120.
- Appleyard, E. T. S.; J. R. Bristow (1939). "The Electrical Conductivity of Thin Films of Mercury". Proceedings of the Royal Society of London. Series A. Mathematical and Physical Sciences (172.951): 530–539. Bibcode:1939RSPSA.172..530A. doi:10.1098/rspa.1939.0119.
- Appleyard, E. T. S.; J. R. Bristow & H. London (1939). "Variation of Field Penetration with Temperature in a Superconductor". Nature. 143 (3619): 433–434. Bibcode:1939Natur.143..433A. doi:10.1038/143433a0. S2CID 4083578.
