= Winestead Hall =

Country house in the East Riding of Yorkshire, England

Coordinates: 53.7131°N 0.0357°W

Winestead Hall was a large country house at Winestead in the East Riding of Yorkshire, England.

== History ==
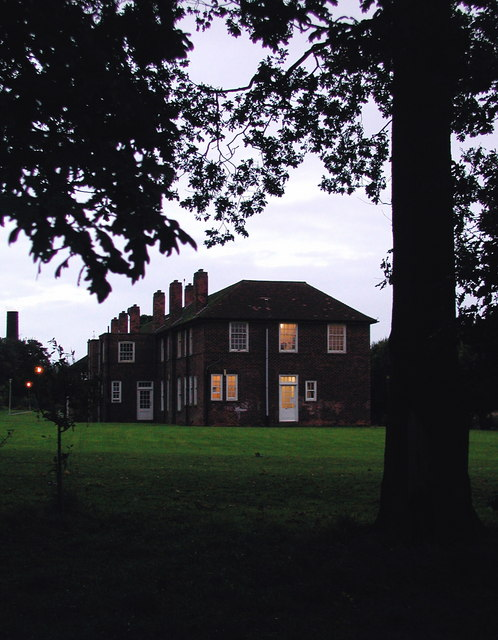
1930s buildings replacing Winestead Hall

Sir Robert Hildyard, 2nd Baronet commissioned the house, which was then known as the Red Hall, to a design thought to have been by Lord Burlington, in the 1720s. The work was completed by Sir Robert Hildyard, 3rd Baronet. Following the death of the 4th Baronet in 1814, the house passed to his niece, Ann Catherine Whyte, who married in the following year Thomas Blackborne Thoroton, Esq., of Flintham Hall, Flintham, Nottingham. Col. Thoroton of the Coldstream Guards subsequently assumed the name and coat-of-arms of Hildyard. In the 1890s the house was sold to Hull Corporation, who demolished it in 1936 to make way for a hospital.
