= Boynton baronets =

Extinct baronetcy in the Baronetage of England

- Escutcheon of the Boynton baronets of Barmston
- Creation date: 1618
- Status: extinct
- Extinction date: 1966
- Motto: Il tempo passa, Time passes

The Boynton baronetcy, of Barmston in the County of York, was a title in the Baronetage of England. It was created on 15 May 1618 for Matthew Boynton, son of Sir Francis Boynton (Sheriff of Yorkshire) of Barmston Hall, in the East Riding of Yorkshire. The Boyntons came to Barmston following the marriage of heiress Margaret de la See to Sir Henry Barmston in the 15th century. The first Baronet married Francis Griffith, heiress of an estate at Burton Agnes including Burton Agnes Hall and Burton Agnes Manor House which the second Baronet inherited in 1647. The fifth and sixth Baronets both served as High Sheriff of Yorkshire, in 1750 and 1771 respectively. The eleventh Baronet died without male issue and the Baronetcy passed to his cousin. His estates however passed to his daughter Cicely (d. 1947) whose husband Thomas Lamplugh Wickham changed his name on marriage to Wickham-Boynton, and later (1989) to Cunliffe-Lister relations descended from Mary Constance Boynton, wife of the 1st Earl of Swinton. The title became extinct on the death of the thirteenth Baronet in 1966.

== Boynton baronets, of Barmston (1618) ==
- Sir Matthew Boynton, 1st Baronet (1591–1647)
- Sir Francis Boynton, 2nd Baronet (1618–1695)
- Sir Griffith Boynton, 3rd Baronet (1664–1731)
- Sir Francis Boynton, 4th Baronet (1677–1739)
- Sir Griffith Boynton, 5th Baronet (1712–1761)
- Sir Griffith Boynton, 6th Baronet (1745–1778)
- Sir Griffith Boynton, 7th Baronet (1769–1801)
- Sir Francis Boynton, 8th Baronet (1777–1832)
- Sir Henry Boynton, 9th Baronet (1778–1854)
- Sir Henry Boynton, 10th Baronet (1811–1869)
- Sir Henry Somerville Boynton, 11th Baronet (1844–1899)
- Sir Griffith Boynton, 12th Baronet (1849–1937)
- Sir Griffith Wilfrid Boynton, 13th Baronet (1889–1966), baronetcy extinct with his death.

Baronetage of England
Preceded by Lucy baronets	Boynton baronets 15 May 1618	Succeeded by Littleton baronets
