= Charles Duncombe (English banker) =

English banker and Tory politician

Arms of Duncombe: Per chevron engrailed gules and argent, three talbot's heads erased counterchanged

Sir Charles Duncombe (November 1648 – 9 April 1711) of Teddington, Middlesex and Barford, Wiltshire, was an English banker and Tory politician who sat in the English and British House of Commons between 1685 and 1711. He served as Lord Mayor of London from 1708 to 1709. He made a fortune in banking and was said to be worth £400,000 later in life, and the richest commoner in England on his death.

== Early life ==
Duncombe was baptized on 16 November 1648, the second son of Alexander Duncombe of Drayton Beauchamp, Buckinghamshire, and his wife Mary Pawley, daughter of Richard Pawley of Whitchurch, Buckinghamshire. He was apprenticed to the London goldsmith Edward Backwell in 1665 and became in 1672 a member of the Goldsmiths' Company. He was tipped off by Lord Shaftesbury to withdraw a large sum of money from the Treasury before the Government suspended payment, and when Backwell was ruined because of the suspension, Duncombe took over his premises in Lombard Street at the sign of the Grasshopper.

== Banker and official ==
In 1680, Duncombe was appointed Cashier of excise at an annual salary of £600 p.a, holding the post until 1697 and Commissioner for the Mint, holding the post until 1686. He was six clerk in Chancery from 1682 to 1683. On the basis of the public income from all these posts he helped found a new type of credit agency. He was also able to make additional money by rigging the market in Exchequer tallies. He also served as alderman for Broad Street ward in the City of London from 1683 to 1686 (from which he was discharged by Royal Commission). In 1684 he was appointed Commissioner for tin coinage 1684 until 1687, and Cashier of hearth-tax at a salary of £400 p.a. in return for a £50,000 loan to the King at five per cent interest, holding the post until November 1688. When James II fled the country in 1688, Duncombe refused him a loan of £1,500 to aid his escape.

== Political career ==
At the 1685 English general election, Duncombe was returned unopposed as Member of Parliament for Hedon as a Court supporter. He was very active in Parliament and served on 14 committees, including the committee of elections and privileges. At the 1690 English general election he transferred to Yarmouth (Isle of Wight) where he was again returned unopposed. At the 1695 English general election he transferred again to Downton, supporting the Tories. During this period he opposed the establishment of the Bank of England. In 1694 he bought the 40,000 acre Helmsley estate, now Duncombe Park.

In 1698, Duncombe was arrested and imprisoned in the Tower of London, and subsequently expelled from the House of Commons, for "contriving and advising the making of false Indorsements of several Bills, made forth at the Receipt of Exchequer, commonly called Exchequer-Bills", in other words a tax fraud. He was expelled from the House of Commons on 1 February 1698. However, at his trial, he was acquitted through a mistake in the information. He was knighted on 20 October 1699. He was Alderman for Bridge Within ward from 1700 until his death and was Sheriff of London in 1700.

At the first general election of 1701 he was defeated at Downton but was returned to parliament as MP for Ipswich. At the second general election of 1701 he was defeated when he stood for the City of London, and having not stood at either Ipswich or Downton, was excluded from Parliament until the 1702 English general election when he was returned for Hedon and Downton, choosing to sit for the latter. He was appointed to a committee to investigate the prices of coal in London and in February 1703 he handled his constituents' petition for an extra market day at Downton. He avoided voting for the Tack in 1704. At the 1705 English general election he was returned again for Downton and voted against the Court candidate for Speaker on 25 October 1705. He was fairly inactive in Parliament but in the City of London he came under attack from Whigs who removed him as a militia colonel, and his mayoral ambitions were overlooked by the court of aldermen.

At the 1708 British general election, Duncombe was returned again unopposed for Downton and in September 1708 became Lord Mayor of London to the indignation of the Whigs. He was to have had a publicly performed pageant for his, but it was stopped by the death of Prince George of Denmark (Queen Anne's husband), the day before.

In May 1709, he endorsed the candidacy of Dr Henry Sacheverell for the chaplaincy of St Saviour's, Southwark and later showed Tory partisanship by reportedly giving only £50 for the relief of the Palatine refugees, and only for the sake of his office. Though generally known for support of charitable causes and praised by the poor debtors of the Wood Street compter for his help while Mayor, the Palatines were a Whig cause. He opposed the impeachment of Sacheverell in 1710, later entertaining him at his home in Teddington. He was returned as MP for Downton at the 1710 British general election, and was later cited as one of the ‘worthy patriots’ who in the first session of the 1710 Parliament helped to detect the mismanagements of the previous administration'. However Harley was disappointed that he was unforthcoming in providing any financial support for the administration.

== Death and legacy ==
Duncombe died intestate and unmarried at Teddington on 9 April 1711, and was described as "the richest commoner of England." His brother, Anthony Duncombe, was also MP for Hedon, died before him. His nephew and heir, also called Anthony, was later ennobled as Lord Feversham. His sister Ursula Duncombe inherited half of Duncombe's fortune and was the ancestor of the present-day Barons Feversham.

Parliament of England
Preceded by Henry Guy; William Boynton	Member of Parliament for Hedon; 1685–1687; With: Henry Guy	Succeeded by Henry Guy; Matthew Appleyard (younger)
Preceded by Sir Robert Holmes; Hon. Fitton Gerard	Member of Parliament for Yarmouth; 1690–1695; With: Sir John Trevor 1690–95; Henry Holmes 1695	Succeeded by Henry Holmes; Anthony Morgan
Preceded by Sir Charles Raleigh; Maurice Bocland	Member of Parliament for Downton; 1695–1698; With: Sir Charles Raleigh	Succeeded by Sir Charles Raleigh; Maurice Bocland
Preceded by Sir James Ashe; Carew Raleigh	Member of Parliament for Downton; 1702–1707; With: Sir James Ashe 1702–05; John Eyre 1705–07	Succeeded by Parliament of Great Britain
Parliament of Great Britain
Preceded by Parliament of England	Member of Parliament for Downton; 1707–1711; With: John Eyre 1707–11	Succeeded by John Eyre; Thomas Duncombe
Civic offices
Preceded by Sir William Withers	Lord Mayor of London; 1708–1709	Succeeded by Sir Samuel Garrard, Bt
