= John Appleyard =

English cricketer

Personal information
- Full name: John Appleyard
- Born: 20 July 1938 (age 88); Hertfordshire, England
- Bowling: Slow left-arm orthodox

Domestic team information
- Years: Team
- 1966–1974: Hertfordshire
- LA debut: 30 April 1966 Hertfordshire v Berkshire
- Last LA: 29 June 1974 Hertfordshire v Durham

Career statistics
Competition	List A
Matches	5
Runs scored	13
Batting average	6.50
100s/50s	0/0
Top score	6*
Balls bowled	274
Wickets	5
Bowling average	25.80
5 wickets in innings	0
10 wickets in match	0
Best bowling	2/11
Catches/stumpings	0/–
- Source: CricketArchive, 18 October 2008

John Appleyard (born 20 July 1938) is an English former List A cricketer. Born at Hitchin, he was a left-arm slow bowler who played for Hertfordshire. He made his first cricketing appearance in 1957, at the age of 19, playing for Essex's Second XI, taking two wickets in the first innings in which he bowled. Appleyard appeared occasionally in the Minor Counties Championship between 1960 and 1965 for Buckinghamshire. He made his List A debut in the Gillette Cup competition of 1966, and also appeared in the 1969, 1971 and 1974 competitions.
