= Short-lived ministry =

18th-century British cabinet that served a brief term

Bath–Granville Ministry
- (Disputed) Cabinet of Great Britain

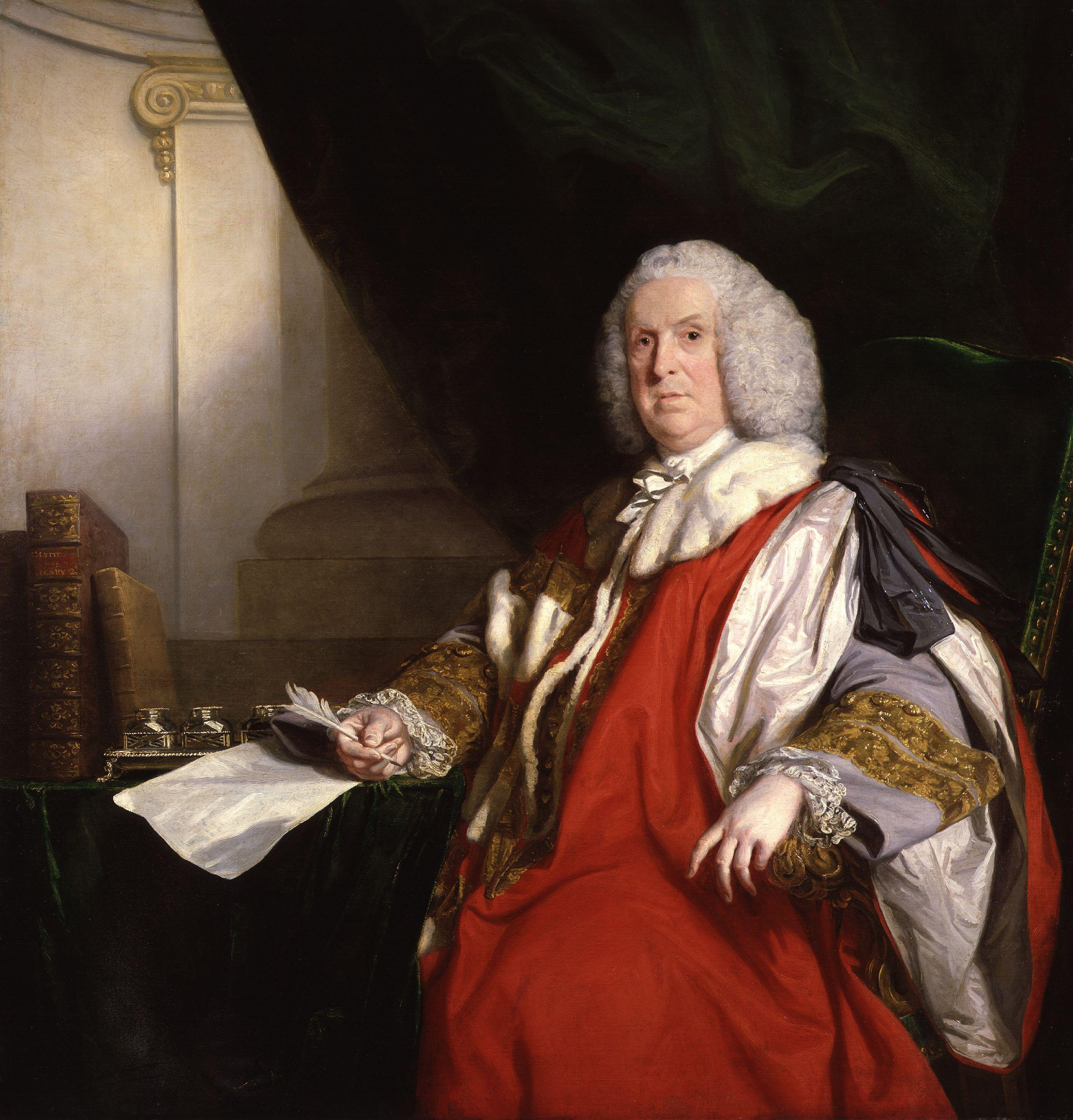
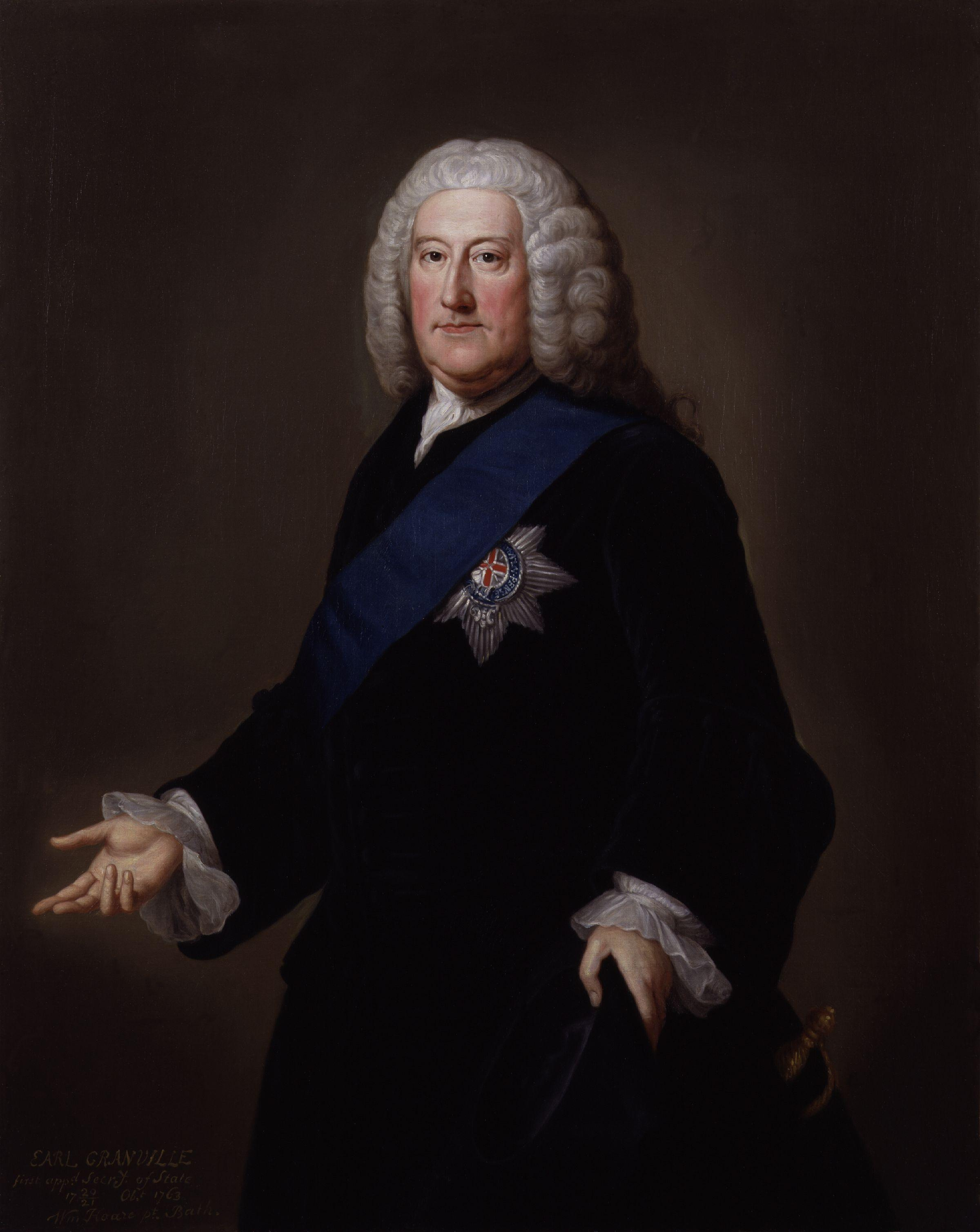
- Bath–Granville ministry Bath (left) and Granville (right)
- Date formed: 10 February 1746
- Date dissolved: 12 February 1746

People and organisations
- Monarch: George II
- Prime Minister: William Pulteney
- Total no. of members: 4
- Member party: Whigs
- Status in legislature: None
- Opposition party: Tories
- Opposition leader: Sir Watkin Williams-Wynn

History
- Election: 1741 general election
- Legislature terms: 1741–1747
- Predecessor: Broad Bottom ministry
- Successor: Broad Bottom ministry

The Bath–Granville ministry, better known as the short-lived ministry, was a ministry of Patriot Whigs in Great Britain that existed briefly in February 1746.

On 10 February, with the resignation of Henry Pelham and the Cobhamites, William Pulteney, 1st Earl of Bath undertook the formation of a ministry with John Carteret, 2nd Earl Granville, the former Northern Secretary. However, it only lasted two days, collapsing on 12 February (even before all the ministers could be appointed), and Pelham was reappointed by George II to resume the Broad Bottom ministry on 14 February.

== Cabinet ==
Below are Bath's appointments before he abandoned the attempt to form a ministry; it does not appear that either Carlisle or Winchilsea actually received the seals of office from the King.

Portfolio	Minister	Took office	Left office
First Lord of the Treasury	William Pulteney, 1st Earl of Bath (head of ministry)	10 February 1746	12 February 1746
Lord Privy Seal	Henry Howard, 4th Earl of Carlisle	10 February 1746	12 February 1746
First Lord of the Admiralty	Daniel Finch, 8th Earl of Winchilsea	10 February 1746	12 February 1746
Secretary of State for the Northern Department (Note: Carteret was the sole person to receive the seals of Secretary of State before the collapse of the ministry but intended to manage the Northern Department had the ministry remained in place.)	John Carteret, 2nd Earl Granville (head of ministry)	10 February 1746	12 February 1746

Other appointments which had been determined upon but not made, according to contemporary rumour, were:

- Secretary of State – George Cholmondeley, 3rd Earl of Cholmondeley
- Lord Lieutenant of Ireland – Charles Powlett, 3rd Duke of Bolton
- Master of the Horse – William Bentinck, 2nd Duke of Portland
- Leader of the House of Commons – Sir John Rushout, 4th Baronet

== Sources ==
- Cook, Chris; Stevenson, John (1988), British Historical Facts: 1688–1760, Palgrave Macmillan UK, ISBN 978-1-349-02369-1
- Haydn, Joseph Timothy (1851), The Book of Dignities, London: Longman Brown
- Sedgwick, Romney R. (1970), "IV. Oppositions, 1742–4 and 1747–51", in R. Sedgwick (ed.), The History of Parliament: the House of Commons 1715–1754, Longmans, Green, ISBN 978-0-11-880098-3 – via History of Parliament Online

Preceded by First Broad Bottom ministry	Government of Great Britain; 10–12 February 1746	Succeeded by Second Broad Bottom ministry
