= Sir Francis Boynton, 4th Baronet =

English landowner and member of parliament (1677–1739)

Sir Francis Boynton, 4th Baronet (17 November 1677 – 16 September 1739), of Barmston in the East Riding of Yorkshire, was an English landowner and member of parliament.

== Life ==
Boynton was the eldest son of the Reverend Henry Boynton, Rector of Barmston. He was educated at Beverley Grammar School and St John's College, Cambridge. Admitted at Gray's Inn in 1696, he became a barrister. He inherited the baronetcy on 22 December 1731, on the death of his cousin Sir Griffith Boynton, who had no children. He served in Parliament as member for Hedon from 1734 until his death five-and-a-half years later.

On 8 April 1703, he married Frances Heblethwayte, daughter of James Heblethwayte, and they had three children:

- Griffith Boynton (1712–1761), who succeeded to the baronetcy
- Francis Boynton
- Constance, who married Ralph Hutton

Parliament of Great Britain
Preceded by William Pulteney; Harry Pulteney	Member of Parliament for Hedon; 1734–1739; With: George Berkeley	Succeeded by George Berkeley; Harry Pulteney
Baronetage of England
Preceded by Griffith Boynton	Baronet (of Barmston); 1731–1739	Succeeded by Griffith Boynton
