= Henry Hildyard (MP) =

English politician

Henry Hildyard (26 January 1610 – 8 June 1674) was an English politician.

He was the oldest son of Sir Christopher Hildyard of Winestead, Yorkshire and was educated at Trinity College, Cambridge and at the Inner Temple.

In the Convention Parliament of 1660, he was elected at a by-election for the family borough of Hedon. In 1660 he was also given the position of Chamberlain of the Exchequer for life and in 1670 made a Gentleman of the Privy Chamber, also for life.

He died in 1674. He had married Lady Anne Leke, the daughter of Francis Leke, 1st Earl of Scarsdale and had 5 sons and 9 daughters.
