= Matthew Appleyard (died 1700) =

17th-century English politician

Matthew Appleyard (c. 1660 – June 1700) was an English country gentleman who was a member of the House of Commons of England between 1690 and 1695.

The third son of Sir Matthew Appleyard (c. 1607–1670) and his wife Frances, a daughter of Sir William Pelham, he was educated at Beverley School and St John's College, Cambridge, where he was admitted on 27 April 1677, aged 16.

In 1661, in infancy, Appleyard was given the office of Joint Customer (a customs officer) for Kingston-upon-Hull. The actual work was carried out by a deputy. He held the post on his own from 1670 to May 1688. Having given evasive answers to King James II’s questions on the Test Acts and the Penal Laws, he was removed. However, after the Glorious Revolution he was reinstated. He was a Member of Parliament (MP) for Hedon near Kingston-upon-Hull from 1690 to 1695, having presented the corporation of Hedon with a handsome silver tankard. This was an office previously held by his late father. While serving in the Commons, Appleyard was listed by Lord Carmarthen as a Tory and a probable Court supporter. The next year, Robert Harley listed him as a Court supporter, while between 1693 and 1695 he was twice listed as a "placeman". He did not stand for re-election at the 1695 English general election.

On 30 May 1682, Appleyard married Jane, a daughter of William Ramsden, a merchant of Hull. They had five sons and two daughters.

Appleyard died at Lambeth, Surrey, south of the River Thames near the Palace of Westminster, in the first week of June 1700. His body was buried at Burstwick, the Appleyard family seat near Hull, Yorkshire.

Parliament of England
Preceded by Henry Guy; Charles Duncombe	Member of Parliament for Hedon; 1689–1695; With: Henry Guy	Succeeded by Lord Spencer; Sir William Trumbull
