= Hugh Bethell (died 1717) =

English politician

Hugh Bethell (c. 1648 – 2 February 1717), of Rise, Yorkshire, was an English politician.

He was Mayor of Hedon in 1683–84. He was a member (MP) of the parliament of England for Hedon in the period 3 December 1695 – 1700.
