= John Thomson (fraudster) =

- Born: Scotland
- Occupation: Warehousekeeper
- Years active: 1725 - 1731
- Known for: Fraudulent scheme at the Charitable Corporation

John Thomson was a British warehousekeeper to the Charitable Corporation in London who participated in a fraudulent scheme that deprived the corporation of the bulk of its assets.

== Early life ==
John Thomson was a Scot, the son of another John Thomson.

== Charitable Corporation ==
The Charitable Corporation was a pawnbroking enterprise, making loans against goods at "lawful interest" (then 5%) and "reasonable charges" (amounting to another 5%). John Thomson was appointed the keeper of their main warehouse in Fenchurch Street, London on 15 November 1725, he was appointed warehouse keeper and Mr Clarke was appointed surveyor. Six months later, Clarke was instructed to report on the deficiency in securities (goods pledged) there, but this was followed by Thomson procuring Clarke's removal from office. His key to the warehouse was then delivered to a menial servant of the company. This gave Thomson unrestricted access to the warehouse.

== The Partnerships of Five and of Four ==
Thomson joined with the banker and broker George Robinson, Sir Archibald Grant, William Burroughs, William Squire, of whom the last three were members of the committee or Assistants of the company. In October 1727, they began to buy shares in the company. Later they also speculated in shares of the York Buildings Company, and in Scottish mines. Before this started Grant was in debt to Thomson and Grant and Burroughs were in debt to Robinson for losses on previous share speculation. All their joint speculation was financed with the company's money, which had been borrowed against fictitious pledges. The speculation was successful for a time, as York Buildings Company shares more than doubled in price. At that point all the partners except Robinson could have redeemed their pledges and have been left solvent, but that did not happen. In 1730, the Corporation of London petitioned for the regulation of the Charitable Corporation, as lending at an unlawful interest rate. The partners (except Grant, who was in Scotland) made further share purchases.

== Collapse ==
In October 1731, Robinson and Thomson fled to France. On 25 October Jeremiah Wainwright, the accomptant of the Company placed an advertisement in the London Gazette offering £1000 reward for his apprehension. He was described as:

Five foot seven inches high, from thirty-five to forty years old, a full oval face, large hazle eyes, with large dark bown eyebrows, inclined to be fat, thick legs, and goes with his kneees in, supposed to go away in a blue cloth coat with gold thread buttons.

Robinson returned in late November and appeared before the company, but went overseas again because the company would not supersede his bankruptcy. Thomson reached Rome, where he was secured by Senor Belloni and imprisoned in the "Castle of St Angelo". Sir Robert Sutton one of the Committee sought information from a correspondent in Paris, who sent on a letter from Belloni, offering terms for Thomson's return. By that time the fraud was under investigation by a Committee of the House of Commons. The letter was passed to the committee, who were so offended by its terms that they ordered it to be burnt by the public hangman.
