= Lady Elizabeth Anson (political adviser) =

Political adviser and correspondent

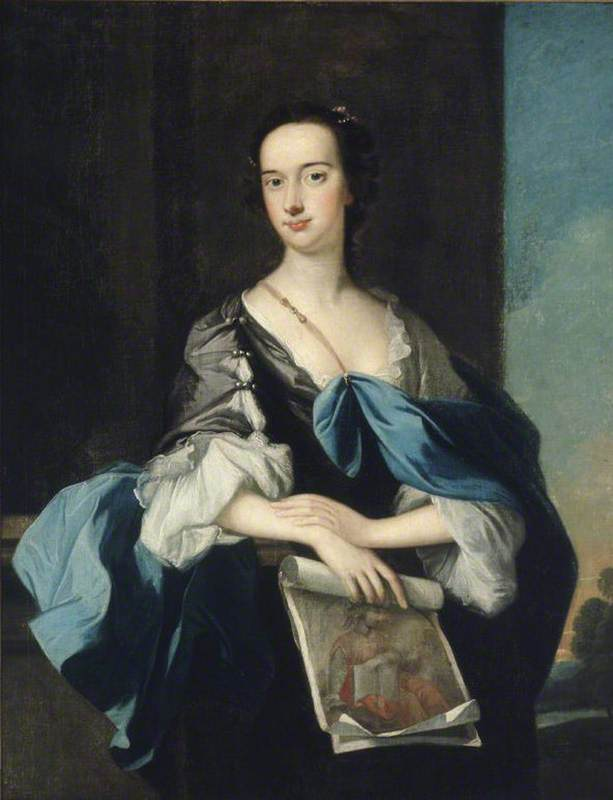
- Portrait by Thomas Hudson, c. 1751
- Born: Elizabeth Yorke; August 1725
- Died: 1 June 1760 (aged 34)
- Spouse: George Anson
- Father: Philip Yorke, 1st Earl of Hardwicke
- Relatives: Philip; Charles; Joseph; John; James; Margaret

Lady Elizabeth Anson (née Yorke; August 1725–1 June 1760) was a political adviser and correspondent.

== Early life ==
Elizabeth Yorke, born in August 1725, was the sixth child and eldest daughter of Philip Yorke and Margaret Lygon. Through her education she developed interests in the arts—including literature, poetry and pastel illustration—and politics.

In April 1748, Yorke married George Anson, 1st Baron Anson—at that time known for his circumnavigation of the globe— and while the marriage didn't produce any children, it appears to have been a happy one.

== Career ==
Soon after the marriage, Elizabeth Anson was instrumental in an electoral agreement with John Leveson-Gower that gave a Lichfield constituency seat for George's brother.

During the time that George was First Lord of the Admiralty Anson lived with him at the Admiralty. As George disliked paperwork, Anson became his de facto secretary and handled most of his correspondences. Through this work she became even politicly connected and influential, acting as patronage broker and correspondent as to political goings-on. This was especially the case to her brother Joseph (ambassador to the Netherlands from 1751), who called her his "dear Emissary Westminster". She also served as an advisor to her other brothers. When in 1756, the invasion of Minorca by the French caused criticism of the Admiralty, Anson personally wrote a response to appear in the Public Advertiser, under a male pseudonym.

Her influence made her a target of attacks by the likes of Horace Walpole depicting her in letters and verse as "affected and precious" and alleging impotence on Georges part. Mary Delany thought her to be "coxcombical and [her] affects to be learned". On the other hand she was eulogised in The Journal of a Voyage to Lisbon, by Henry Fielding. Lady Anson died on the 1 June 1760, aged 34.
