= Sir Archibald Grant, 2nd Baronet =

Scottish politician and company speculator (1696–1778)

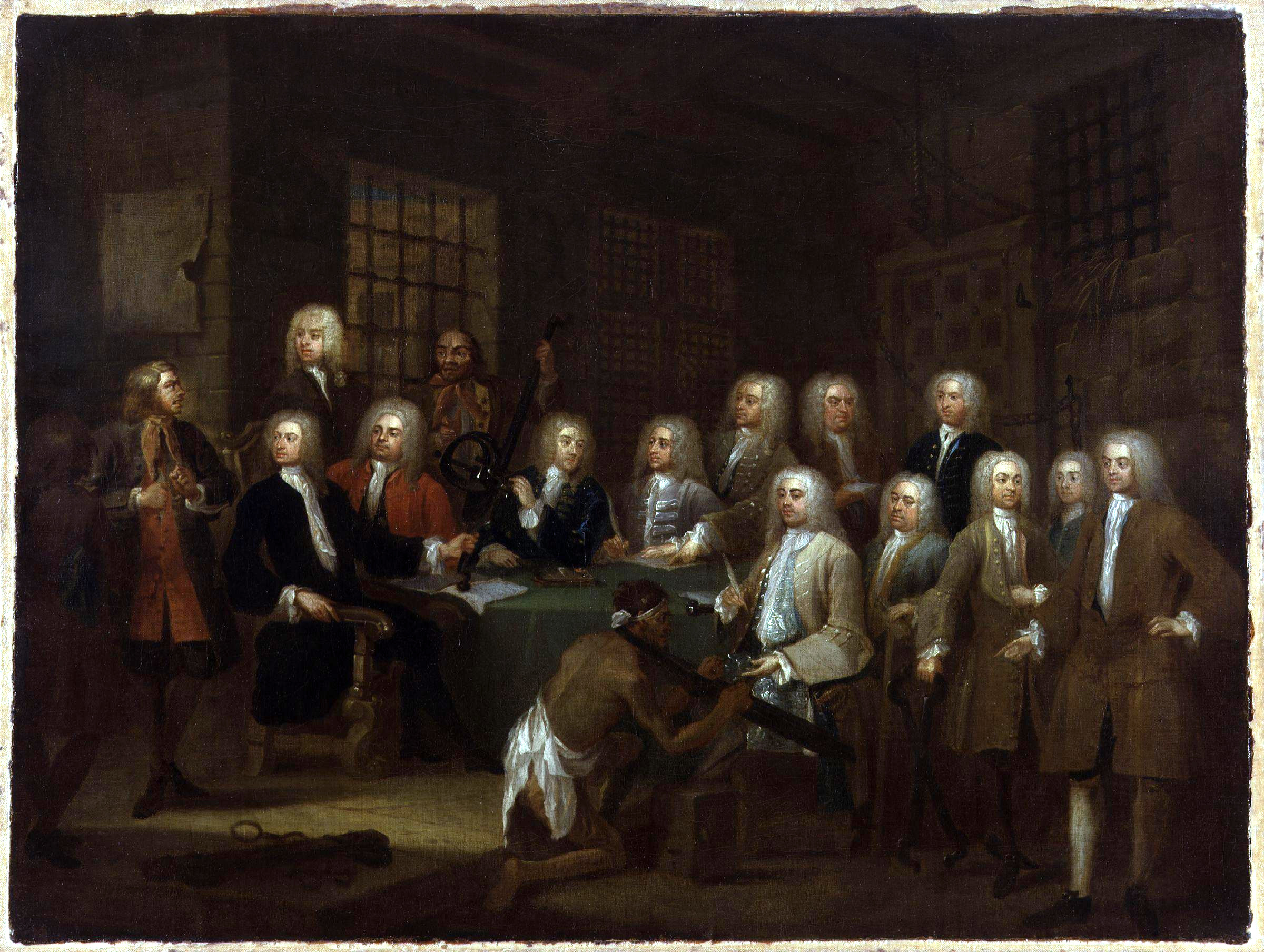
Sir Archibald Grant (standing third from the right) commissioned this painting from William Hogarth

Sir Archibald Grant, 2nd Baronet (25 September 1696 – 17 September 1778), of Monymusk, Aberdeen, was a company speculator and politician who sat in the House of Commons from 1722 to 1732. He was expelled from the House of Commons for his involvement in the frauds on the Charitable Corporation, and returned to Scotland where he devoted his time to improving his estate.

== Background ==
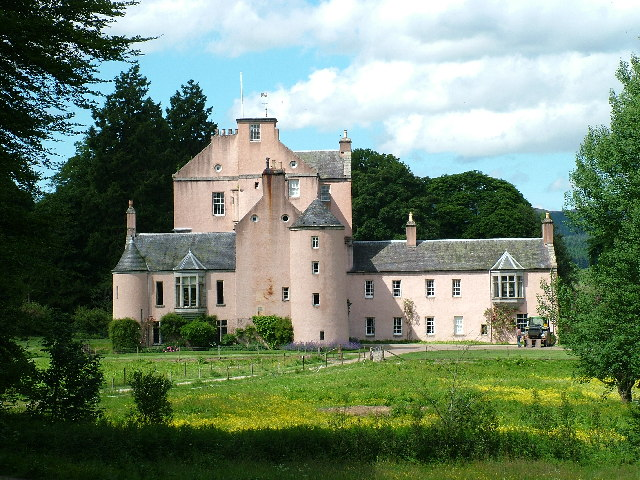
House of Monymusk

Grant was the eldest son of Sir Francis Grant, 1st Baronet, of Cullen of Buchan, Banff, and his first wife Jean Meldrum, daughter of Rev. William Meldrum of Meldrum, Aberdeen. His father, a Lord of Session, with the judicial title of Lord Cullen, had purchased the estate of Monymusk in 1713 after selling his ancestral estate in Banffshire. Grant succeeded to Monymusk and the baronetcy on his father's death in 1726. He passed as a Scottish advocate in 1714, and was subsequently called to the English bar at Lincoln's Inn.

== Political career ==
At the 1722 British general election, Grant was returned unopposed as Member of parliament for Aberdeenshire. He was returned again in a contest at the 1727 British general election and thereafter voted with the opposition. He was a member, in February 1729, of the parliamentary Gaols Committee, chaired by James Oglethorpe, which visited the Fleet and Marshalsea prisons to prepare a report for parliament on the conditions in which debtors were being held. He was expelled from the House of Commons on 5 May 1732.

== Charitable Corporation ==
In London, Archibald Grant became involved in share speculation, possibly from the collapse of the South Sea Bubble. He was elected to the Committee (board of directors) of the Charitable Corporation in October 1725. He was in debt from earlier stockjobbing to George Robinson (a stockjobber). In October 1727, he joined a Partnership of Five to engage in speculation in the Company's shares. This was managed by Robinson, the other three partners being William Burroughs (another director), William Squire (an Assistant), and John Thomson (the Company's warehouse keeper).

== Mines ==
From his second marriage in 1727, Grant was also concerned in mines at Eyam Edge, Derbyshire and Oden in Castleton, Derbyshire, in which his father in law Charles Potts had earlier been concerned. These mines were evidently profitable in the earlier years. Later, there were disputes with managers. In 1747, Grant was trying to sell the mines and the Partington estate (of his wife). The mines were apparently not sold, but operation was clearly hindered by Grant's lack of money.

Grant also bought the mines at Strontian in Scotland for a modest sum and sent Derbyshire miners there to develop them in 1729, also a relative of his wife, to manage them.

His Charitable Corporation partners were told of some mines in Scotland in which he and Sir Robert Sutton another director was concerned, and proposed that the York Buildings Company should lease them, hoping the enhance the value of its stock. They then bought York Buildings shares, which rose in value. While Grant was in Scotland the other four partners made further share purchases. All this was financed by borrowing money from the Charitable Corporation on false pledges. Ultimately the speculation failed. Unable to pay their debts, Robinson and Thomson absconded. The whole affair was then subject to an investigation by a committee of the House of Commons. Grant was expelled from the House.

== Other activities ==
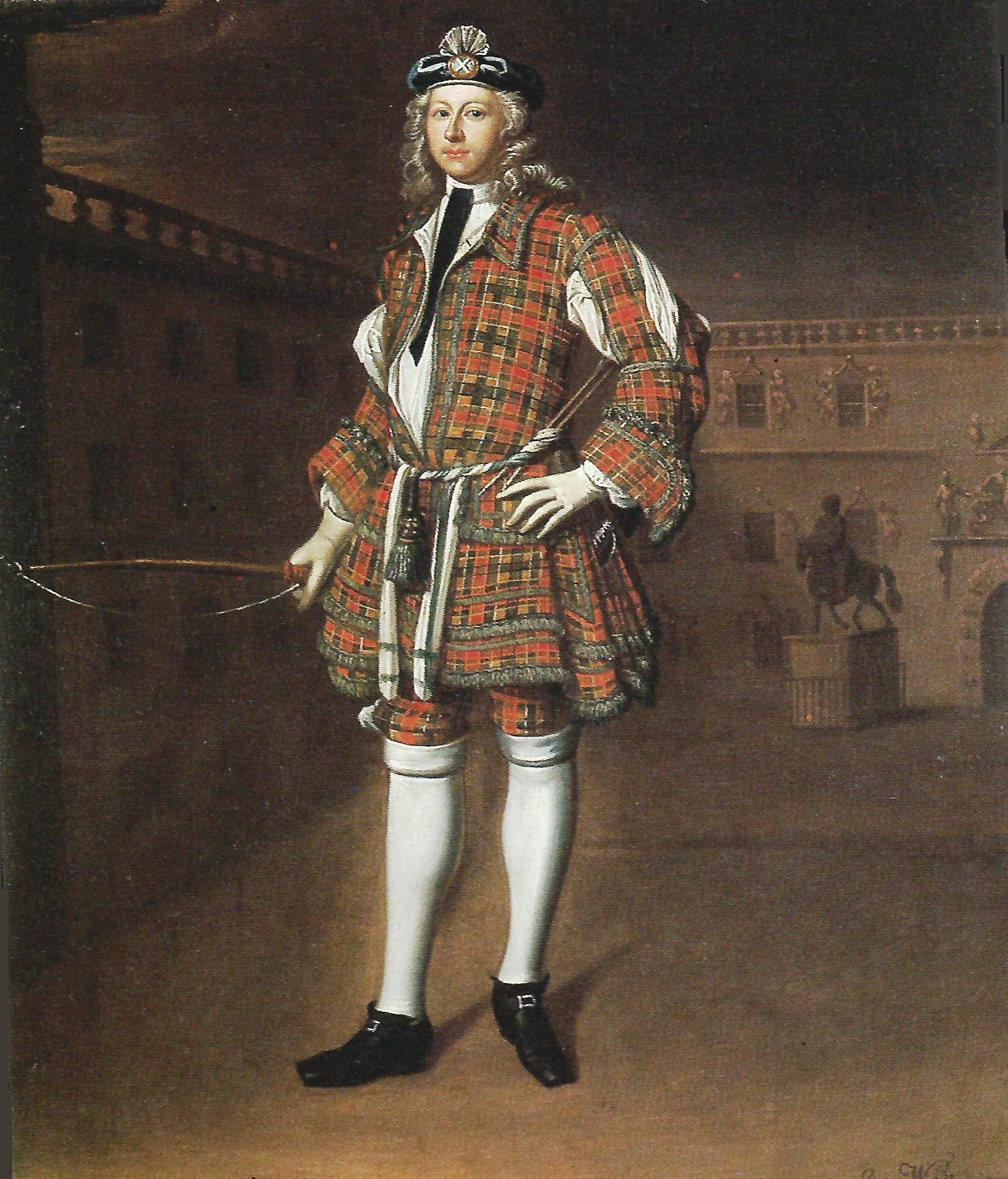
The young Grant in Royal Company of Archers uniform, as painted 1715 by Richard Waitt

In 1728, he and his brother-in-law Alexander Garden of Troup leased from the York Buildings Company the Southesk, Marschal, Pitcairn, and most of the Panmure estates for 29 years at £4000 per year.

== Later life ==
After Grant's expulsion from the Commons, he returned to Scotland and devoted his time to improving his Monymusk estate. He supported rural manufactures such as linen. He introduced English agricultural methods, such as keeping land fallow; and English crops, including clover and ryegrass in connection with crop rotation.

Grant stood for Aberdeenshire at the 1747 British general election but gave up when he learnt that the Duke of Argyll was supporting a Pelham candidate. When Argyll heard that Newcastle was proposing to make Grant sheriff of Aberdeenshire as a consolation for not being returned for the county, he wrote: ‘This requires great consideration, for the blot in his reputation takes place here as well as in England’. He was not appointed sheriff, but in 1749 he obtained a sinecure post as Keeper of register of Hornings.

Grant published two pamphlets on agriculture: The Farmer's New-Year's Gift (Aberdeen, 1757) and The Practical Farmer's Pocket Companion (Aberdeen, 1766). According to David Hume, planting trees was ‘the only laudable thing he has ever done’.

== Family ==
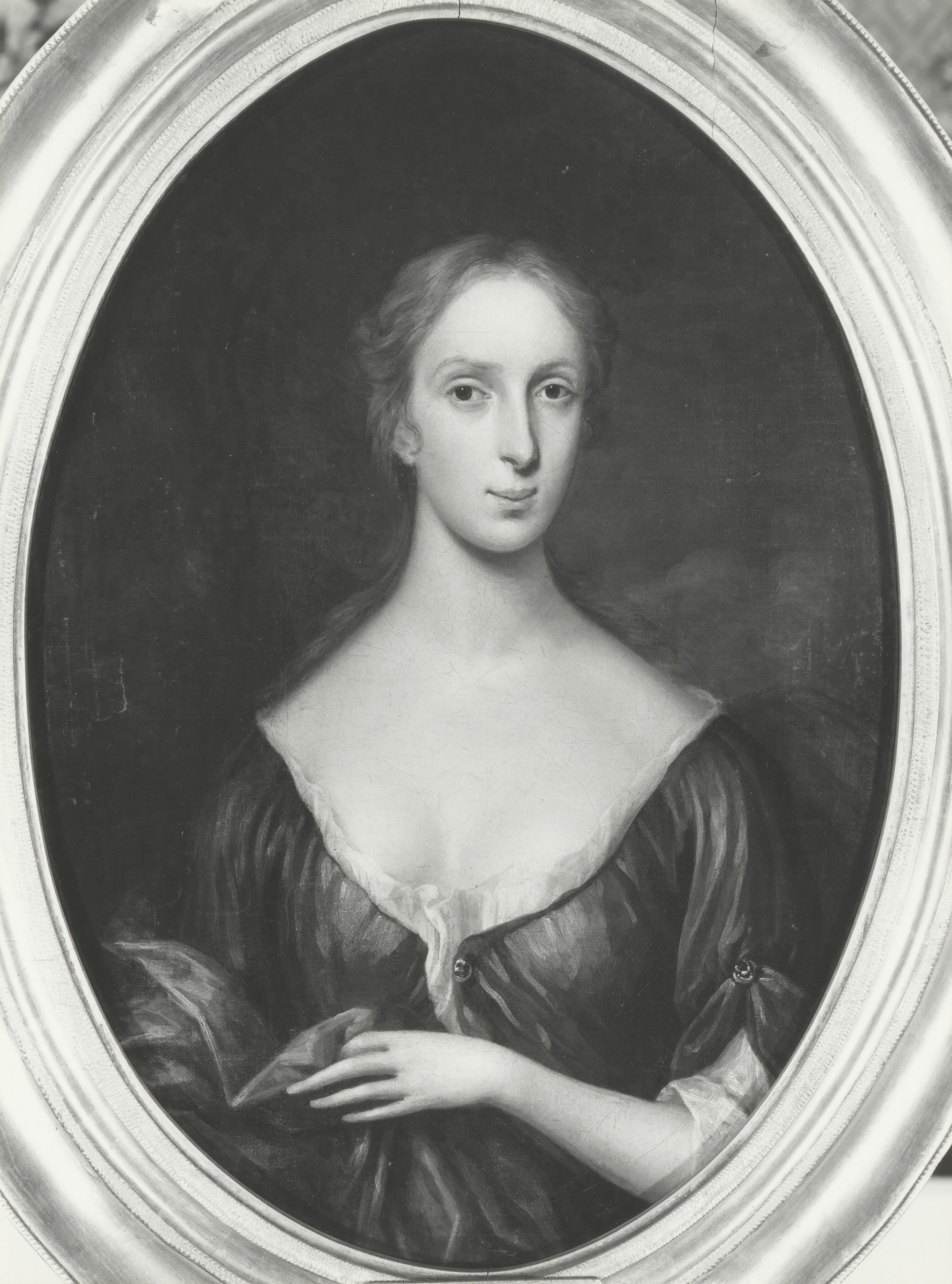
Anne Hamilton, Lady Grant, portrait by John Smibert

Grant married four times. By his first wife, Anne, daughter of James Hamilton of Pencaitland, he had three daughters. His second wife, Anne (died before 1744), daughter of Charles Potts of Castleton in Derbyshire, was the mother of his heir Sir Archibald Grant, 3rd Baronet. The third was Elizabeth (died 1759), widow of James Callander of Jamaica. Finally, he married Jane (1707–1788), widow of Andrew Millar, the London bookseller.

Parliament of Great Britain
Preceded by Sir Alexander Cumming, Bt	Member of Parliament for Aberdeenshire; 1722–1732 (then expelled)	Succeeded by Sir Arthur Forbes, Bt
Baronetage of Nova Scotia
Preceded by Francis Grant	Baronet (of Monymusk); 1726–1778	Succeeded by Archibald Grant
