= John Meres =

British businessman (1660 - 1736)

Sir John Meres FRS (c.1660 – 15 February 1736) of Kirby Bellars, Leicestershire was an English knight and the director of a number of companies in the early 18th century, including the Charitable Corporation, the York Buildings Company, and Company of Mineral and Battery Works. He was also one of the Six Clerks in Chancery (a sinecure).

== Background ==
John Meres was the second son (but main devisee – his elder brother Thomas was disinherited) of Sir Thomas Meres, a Lincolnshire gentleman who for many years was Member of Parliament for Lincoln and Anne de la Fontaine, daughter and heiress of Erasmus de la Fontaine of Kirby Bellars, Leicestershire.

He was educated at St Catharine's College, Cambridge, studied law at the Inner Temple and was called to the bar in 1700.

== Career ==
He was knighted by William III on 26 December 1700. In 1704, he was party to a deed with the Hollow Sword Blade Company. In 1721 and 1722 in the wake of the South Sea Bubble, he was in dispute with the Duke of Portland over the sale of £20,000 worth of South Sea Company stock. He was appointed High Sheriff of Leicestershire for 1715 and elected a Fellow of the Royal Society in 1719.

He was author in 1720 of The Equity of Parliaments and Publick Faith vindicated, in answer to [Sir Richard Steele's] Crisis of Property, and addressed to the Annuitants .

He was unanimously elected Governor of the York Buildings Company on 17 September 1723. That company was originally concerned in water supply, but had in 1719 and 1720 bought various estates (mainly in Scotland), forfeited due to the Jacobite rising of 1715 for over £308,000. However, following the bursting the South Sea Bubble, they had difficulty in raising the purchase money. In summer 1723, stock of the company, previously cancelled, was reissued, but this depressed the share price further. Following his election, Meres proposed that the company should borrow money from the Charitable Corporation, issuing bonds to it, but this fell through. Meres then proposed that each member would surrender half his stock, and added a paragraph to the minutes of the York Buildings Company meeting of 21 September 1724 as if this had been agreed, but this was (according to his opponents) objected to when the minutes were read at the next meeting. At the time, he held ten percent of the company's stock. Nevertheless, the minutes of that meeting were written up as if it had been agreed. The issue of these bonds apparently did not go ahead, but was being questioned in the Scottish courts in 1729.

Meres was a member of the new Committee of the Charitable Corporation, elected on 25 October 1725, but left it in December 1729. His position with these two companies no doubt enabled him to organise a financial transaction between them. He was also Subgovernor of the Royal Africa Company.

== Posterity ==
Whichcot's Estate Act 1773
- Act of Parliament
- Parliament of Great Britain
- Long title: An Act for exonerating Part of the Real Estate of Thomas Whichcot Esquire in the County of Lincoln, from a Debt of Ten thousand Pounds charged thereon, for the Portions of the younger Children of Christopher Whichcote Esquire, and Jone his Wife, Daughter of the said Thomas Whichcot; and for subjecting and charging other Lands of greater Value to the Payment thereof.
- Citation: 13 Geo. 3. c. 31 Pr.
- Territorial extent: Great Britain

Dates
- Royal assent: 1 April 1773
- Commencement: 26 November 1772 (Note: Start of session.)

Status: Current legislation

Meres died unmarried on 19 February 1735 and was buried at Kirby Bellars. His effects in London were sold by auction in May 1736, including jewels, plate, five pictures and mathematical instruments. The bulk of his estate passed to Thomas Whichcot, son of George Whichcot (MP for Lincolnshire) and his sister Francis Katherine Meres. Part of his estates was sold under the authority of a private act of Parliament, Whichcot's Estate Act 1773 (13 Geo. 3. c. 31 Pr.).
