= HMS Anson (S123) =

Astute-class nuclear-powered attack submarine of the Royal Navy

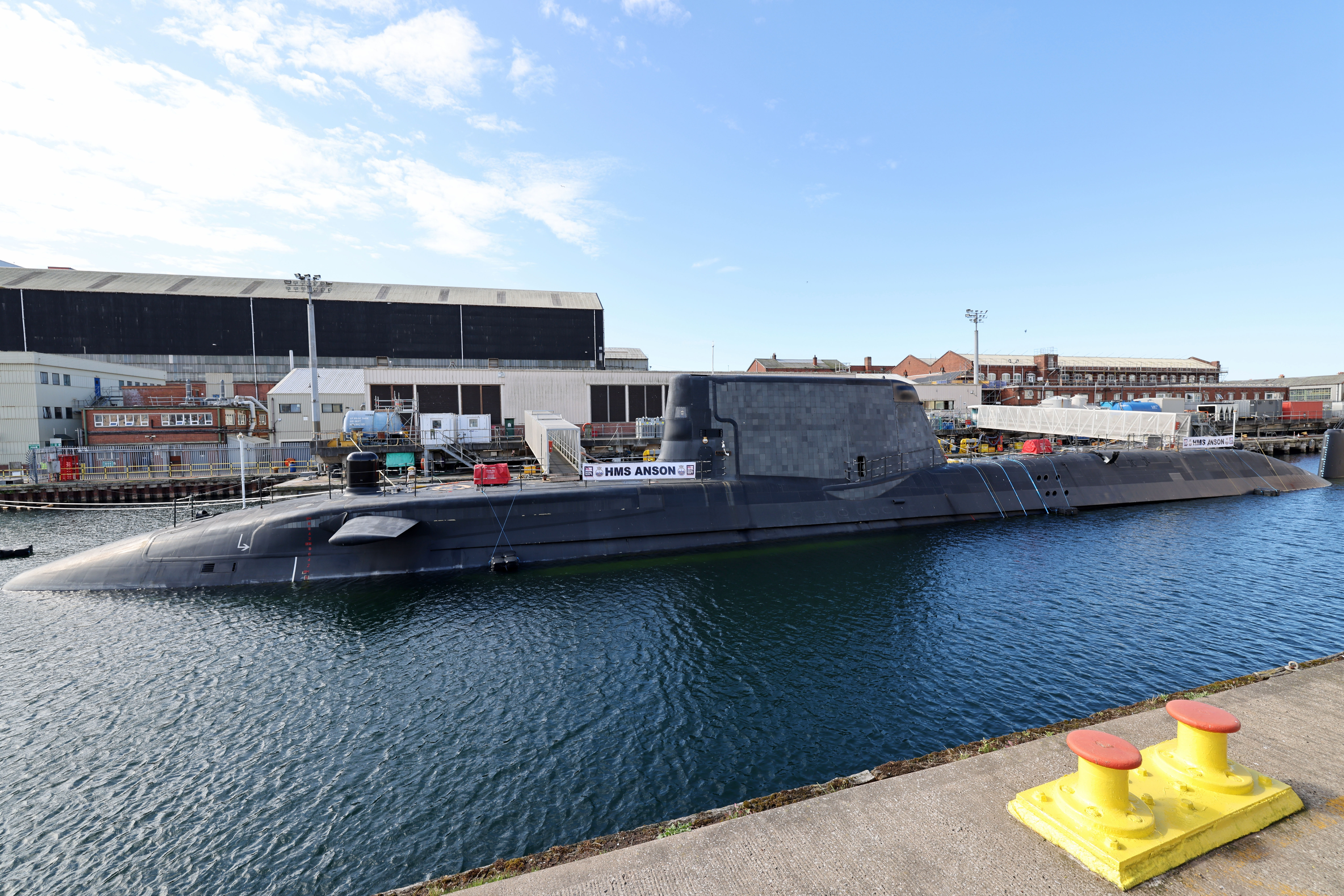
- HMS Anson in Barrow-in-Furness (August 2022)

History

United Kingdom
- Name: HMS Anson
- Namesake: George Anson, 1st Baron Anson
- Ordered: March 2010
- Builder: BAE Systems Submarine Solutions
- Cost: £1.420B (budget)
- Laid down: 13 October 2011
- Launched: 20 April 2021
- Sponsored by: Julie Weale
- Christened: 11 December 2020
- Commissioned: 31 August 2022
- In service: 2024
- Identification: Pennant number: S123
- Motto: Nil desperandum (Never despair)
- Honours and awards: Four inherited battle honours
- Status: In active service
- Badge

General characteristics
- Class & type: Astute-class fleet submarine
- Displacement: Surfaced: 7,000 to 7,400 t (6,900 to 7,300 long tons); Submerged: 7,400 to 7,800 t (7,700 long tons)
- Length: 97 m (318 ft 3 in)
- Beam: 11.3 m (37 ft 1 in)
- Draught: 10 m (32 ft 10 in)
- Propulsion: Rolls-Royce PWR 2 reactor, MTU 600 kilowatt diesel generators
- Speed: 30 kn (56 km/h; 35 mph), submerged
- Range: Unlimited
- Endurance: 90 days
- Test depth: Over 300 m (984 ft 3 in)
- Complement: 98 (capacity for 109)
- Sensors & processing systems: Thales Sonar 2076; Atlas DESO 25 echosounder; 2 × Thales CM010 optronic masts; Raytheon Successor IFF
- Armament: 6 × 21 in (533 mm) torpedo tubes with stowage for up to 38 weapons: Tomahawk Block IV cruise missiles; Spearfish heavyweight torpedoes

HMS Anson is the fifth Astute-class nuclear-powered fleet submarine of the Royal Navy. She is the eighth vessel of the Royal Navy to bear the name, after Admiral George Anson.

== History ==
On 25 March 2010, BAE Systems were given the authorisation by the British government to begin construction on boats 5 and 6 (Anson and Agamemnon), being given a £300 million contract for the "initial build" of boat 5 and "long lead procurement activities" for boat 6. Later that year work was begun on the pressure hull and reactor compartments. On 15 September 2011 it was announced that boat 5 would be named Anson; it was previously believed that boat 5 would be Agamemnon and boat 6 Anson. Her keel was ceremonially laid on 13 October 2011. On 19 November 2015, a possible new contract worth £1.3 billion was signed for HMS Anson. She was officially named on 11 December 2020, was rolled out of the Devonshire Dock Hall on 19 April 2021, and launched on 20 April 2021. It completed its first practice dive in a dock on 14 February 2022. She was commissioned on 31 August 2022 prior to starting sea trials. On 19 February 2023 she left Barrow for the first time for her sea trials. These were declared as complete on 21 May 2024.

At the beginning of February 2025, the submarine docked for the first time in the Port of Gibraltar to load weapons. In early 2026, HMS Anson returned to Gibraltar reportedly en route to Australia, where she was reportedly planned to be based for much of the year at HMAS Stirling. Amid the 2026 Iran war, reports on 21 March indicated that the submarine to be located in the Arabian Sea and is expected to be taking up "position in the deep waters" of the north of the sea. The submarine had been homeported in Perth and had the capacity to strike Iran, rising near the water surface to communicate with the UK’s Permanent Joint Headquarters in Northwood as needed. Nevertheless, in May Anson was reported to have transitted the Suez Canal bound for Gibraltar and U.K. home waters.

== Design ==
=== Propulsion ===
Anson's nuclear reactor will not need to be refuelled during the boat's 25-year service. Since the submarine can purify water and air, she will be able to circumnavigate the planet without resurfacing. The main limit is that the submarine will only be able to carry three months' supply of food for 98 officers and ratings, with a maximum crew complement of 137.

=== Weapons ===
Anson has provision for up to 38 weapons in six 21-inch (533 mm) torpedo tubes. The submarine is reported to be capable of using Tomahawk Block IV land-attack missiles with a range of 1,000 miles (1,600 kilometres) and Spearfish heavyweight torpedoes.
