= Francis Grant, Lord Cullen =

Scottish judge

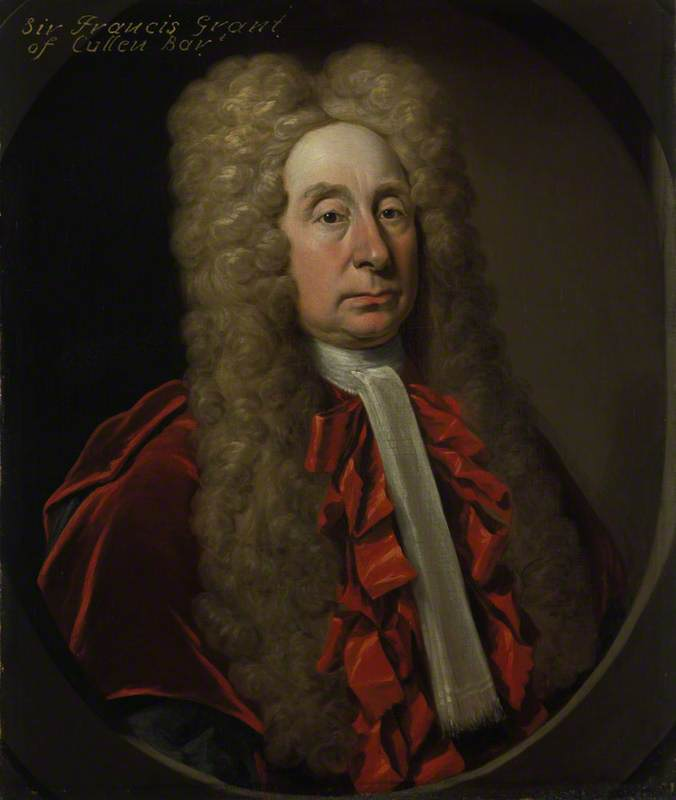
- portrait by John Smibert
- Born: Moray
- Died: 23 March 1726
- Resting place: Greyfriars Kirkyard
- Spouse(s): Jean Meldrum, Sarah Fordyce, Agnes Hay
- Children: 8, including Archibald and William

Sir Francis Grant, Lord Cullen (between 1658 and 1663 – 1726) was a Scottish judge.

== Biography ==
Francis Grant was the elder son of Archibald Grant of Ballintomb, Morayshire, a descendant of James Grant, 3rd Laird of Freuchie, by his wife Christian, daughter of Patrick Nairne of Cromdale, was born at Ballintomb in 1658. He was educated at King's College, Aberdeen, and afterwards at Leiden University where he was a favourite pupil of the learned civilian Johannes Voet.

Soon after his return to Scotland Grant took a prominent part in the discussions on the constitutional questions arising out of the revolution. Some of the older lawyers insisted on the inability of the convention of estates to make any disposition of the crown. Grant strongly opposed this notion, and published a treatise arguing strongly for the power of the estates to establish a new succession.

Grant was admitted an advocate on 29 January 1691, and, owing to the reputation which he had made by this treatise, quickly acquired a large practice. In the exercise of his profession and

was very scrupulous in many points; he would not suffer a just cause to be lost through a client's want of money … and with respect to clergymen of all professions, his conscience obliged him to serve them without a fee.

Grant was created a Baronet of Monymusk, Aberdeen in the baronetage of Nova Scotia with remainder to his heirs male by patent dated 7 December 1705. A few years later he was appointed a Lord Ordinary of the Court of Session in the place of James Murray, Lord Philiphaugh, and took his seat on the bench on 10 June 1709 as Lord Cullen, his title being derived from the name of his paternal estate in Banffshire, which had been ratified to him in 1698, but which he afterwards sold.

In 1713 he purchased the estate of Monymusk in Aberdeenshire, which in 1890 was still the residence of his family, from Sir William Forbes of Pitsligo. On 17 May 1720 he obtained a grant of supporters and an addition to his coat-of-arms, at the same time taking as one of his mottoes the words Jehovah Jireh, the only instance in Scottish heraldry of a Hebrew motto. He died at Edinburgh on 23 March 1726, and was buried in Greyfriars churchyard on 26 March.

== Bibliography ==
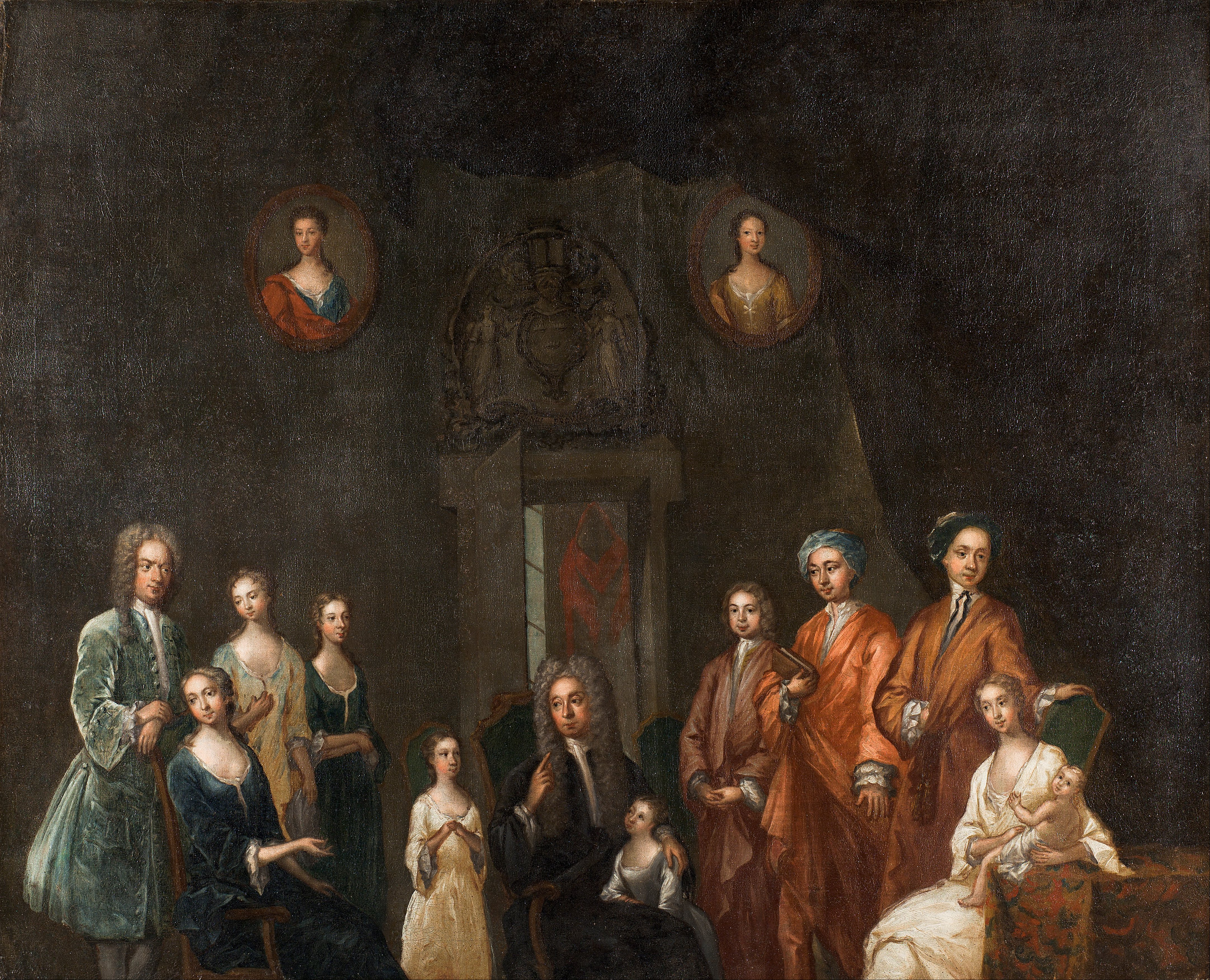
Portrait of Sir Francis Grant, Lord Cullen, and His Family (John Smibert)

Cullen was the author of the following works:

1. The Loyalists Reasons for his giving Obedience, and Swearing Allegiance to the Present Government.… Wherein are answered (by prevention) all the Objections of Dissenters, according to their own Uncontrovertible Principles, by F. G., gent., Edinb. 1689, 8vo.
2. A Brief Account of the Nature, Rise, and Progress of the Societies for Reformation of Manners, &c. in England and Ireland; with a preface, exhorting to the use of such Societies in Scotland, 1700, (anon.), Edinb. 1700, 4to.
3. A Discourse concerning the Execution of the Laws made against Prophaneness, &c. (anon.), Edinb. 1700, 8vo.
4. A Letter from … a Magistrate in the Countrey to … his Freind, giving a new historical account of Designs, through the Christian World, for Reforming Manners therein, &c. (anon.), Edinb. 1701, 4to.
5. A Vindication of Informers of the Breaches of the Laws against Prophanenesa and Immorality—Asserting and Proving the Lawfulness and Necessity of Informing, &c. (anon.), Edinb. 1701, 4to.
6. Reasons in Defence of the Standing Laws about the Right of Presentation in Patronages; to be offered against an act (in case it be) presented for alteration thereof: by a member of parliament. In a letter to his friend in the country, (anon.), Edinb. 1703, 4to. This pamphlet was reprinted as No. 7 of the 'Select Anti-Patronage Library,' Edinb. 1841, 8vo.
7. An Essay for Peace by Union in Judgment; about Church-Government in Scotland. In a letter from … to his neighbour in the countrey, (anon.), Edinb. 1703, 4to.
8. A Letter from a Country Gentleman to his Friend in the City; showing the Reasons which induce him to think that Mr. W[ebste]r is not the Author of the Answer to the Essay for Peace, &c., fol. (1704).
9. A Short History of the Sabbath, containing some few grounds for its Morality, and cases about its Observance; with a brief answer to, or anticipation of, several objections against both (anon.), Edinb. 1705.
10. The Patriot Resolved, in a Letter to an Addresser, from his Friend. of the same Sentiments with himself; concerning the Union, (anon., Edinb. ), 1707, 4to.
11. A Key to the Plot, by reflections on the Rebellion [in Scotland 1715].… In a Letter from a Countryman in Scotland to a Courtier in London, Lond. 1716, 8vo.

The authorship of Law, Religion, and Education considered in Three Essays, &c., Edinb. 1715, 8vo. has generally been ascribed to Cullen, but from internal evidence it would appear the author was another Francis Grant and not Cullen.

== Character assessment ==
He was a deeply religious man, a learned lawyer, and a conscientious judge. Robert Wodrow records:

His [literary] stile is dark and intricat, and so wer his pleadings at the barr, and his discourses on the bench. One of his fellow-senators tells me he was a living library, and the most ready in citations; when the Lords wanted anything in the Civil or Canon law to be cast up, or Acts of Parliament, he never failed them, but turned to the place. He seemed a little ambulatory in his judgment as to church government, but was a man of great piety and devotion, wonderfully serious in prayer and hearing the word.

Wodrow relates that Grant and a few other lawyers set up a "society for prayer, and a kind of correspondence for religiouse purposes about the [year] 1698.… This privat [sic] meeting laid the first foundation of that noble designe of reformation of manners in King William's time and Queen Ann's time that did so much good".

== Family ==
Grant married three times. On 15 March 1694, he married Jean, daughter of the Rev. William Meldrum of Meldrum, Aberdeenshire. With his first wife he had three sons and three daughters. His eldest son, Archibald, succeeded to the baronetcy, and represented Aberdeenshire from 1722 to May 1732, when he was expelled the house for the share which he had taken in the management of the charitable corporation. His second son was William Grant, Lord Prestongrange (1701–1764).

On 18 October 1708, he married Sarah, daughter of the Rev. Alexander Fordyce of Ayton, Berwickshire. They had two daughters. His third wife was Agnes, daughter of Henry Hay and they married in 1718.

== Notes ==
Baronetage of Nova Scotia
New creation	Baronet (of Monymusk); 1705–1726	Succeeded by Archibald Grant
