= Attorney General v Davy =

1741 UK company law case

- Court: Court of Chancery
- Decided: 1 January 1741
- Citations: (1741) 26 ER 531, (1741) 2 Atk 212

Case opinions
- Lord Hardwicke LC

Attorney General v Davy (1741) 26 ER 531 is a UK company law case which established that, by default, a majority of a corporate body can determine what it does.

Equivalent rules in contemporary company law are s 168 Companies Act 2006, which allows shareholders to remove directors through a simple majority, Foss v Harbottle which presupposed that a majority of shareholders can always take action to litigate, and the rule in Automatic Self-Cleansing Filter Syndicate Co Ltd v Cuninghame, which raises the requirement to 75% of the shareholders if they are to give instructions to the board.

== Facts ==
King Edward VI had incorporated twelve people by name in a charter to elect a chaplain for the church of Kirton, just outside Boston, Lincolnshire. A clause stated that three of the twelve would choose a chaplain for the Sandford church as well, another village within the Kirton parish, with the consent of the majority of Sandford residents. A late vacancy had been created. Two of the three chose a chaplain with the majority of residents' consent, but the third dissented. The question was whether the choice was valid.

== Judgment ==
Lord Hardwicke LC held that the chaplain was validly elected, for a corporate body can act by a majority vote at any duly summoned meeting of members.

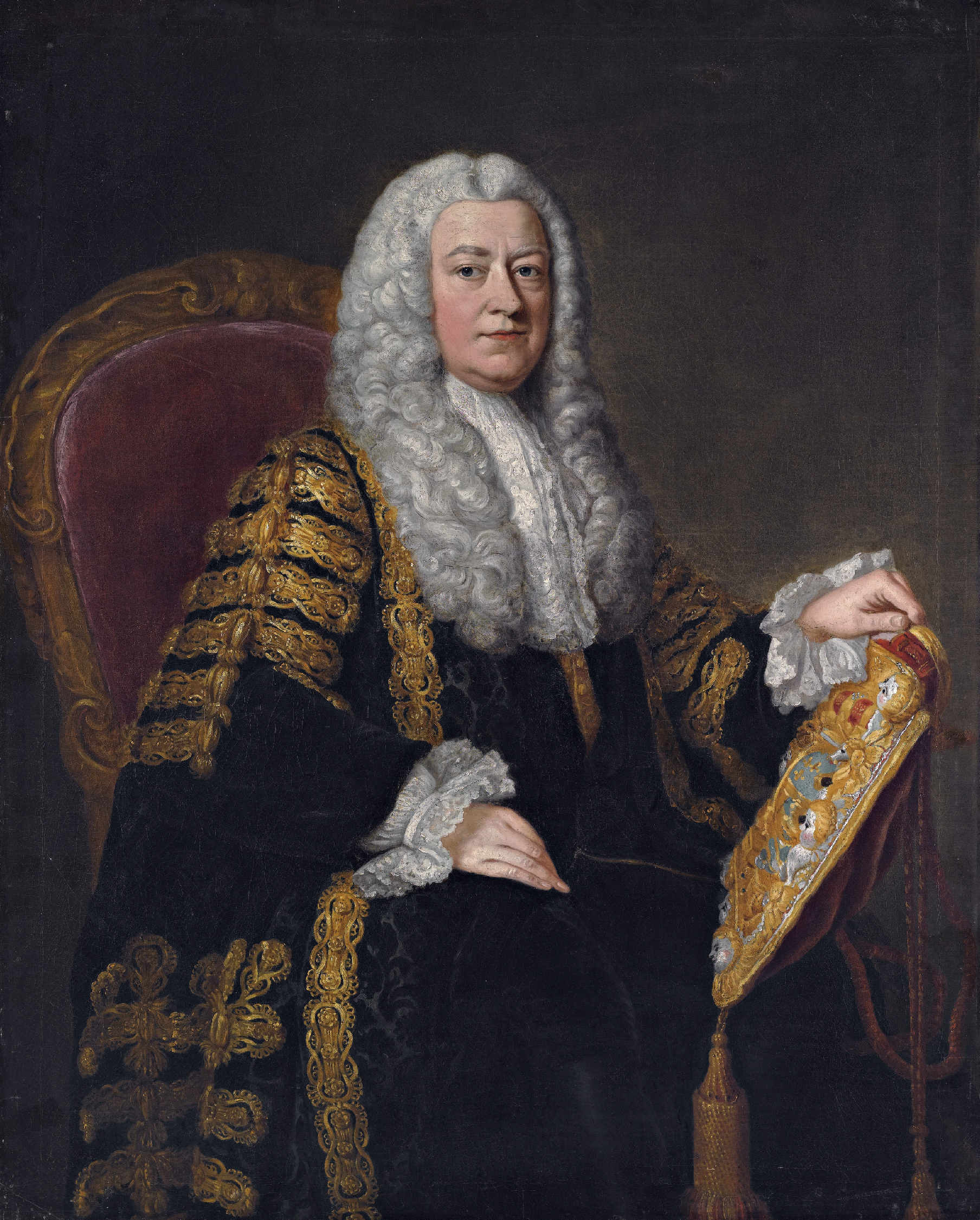
Lord Hardwicke LC

It cannot be disputed that wherever a certain number are incorporated, a major part of them may do any corporate act; so if all are summoned, and part appear, a major part of those that appear may do a corporate act, though nothing be mentioned in the charter of the major part. This is the common construction of charters, and I am of opinion that the three are a corporation for the purpose they are appointed, and the choice too was confirmed, and consequently not necessary that all the three should join; but if the act to be done by a select number of the twelve had been by a different charter, it would have been otherwise; it is not necessary that every corporate act should be under the seal of the corporation, nor did this need the corporation seal.

== See also ==
- United States corporate law
- ICS v West Bromwich BS
