= The Charitable Corp v Sutton =

Directors' duties akin to trustees

The Charitable Corporation v Sutton
- Court: Court of Chancery
- Decided: 13 August 1742
- Citations: (1742) 26 ER 642; 2 Atk 404

Case opinions
- Lord Hardwicke

Keywords
- Directors' duties, negligence, gross negligence, hindsight

The Charitable Corporation v Sutton (1742) 26 ER 642 is an important old English law case which holds in substance that a director of a company owes duties to the company in the same measure and quality as does a trustee to a trust. It makes the point that judges should not be quick to judge decisions of directors with hindsight.

== Facts ==
The Charitable Corporation was a company set up by royal charter, to give loans of money to poor people, to prevent them falling into the hands of pawnbrokers. The directors (or committee-men as they were called at the time) were accused of failing to properly monitor the procedures for loans by the corporation. It had suffered a loss of around £350,000. A warehouse keeper was responsible for giving unsecured loans to fellow directors. Only five directors were actively involved in the corporation's affairs. It was alleged that the failure of the remaining forty-five directors to maintain oversight made them guilty of gross negligence.

== Judgment ==
Lord Hardwicke held that because the directors are agents of the people who grant them power to manage the corporation's affairs they are liable for any negligent acts or omissions. He held that the five who were engaged in taking money were liable to make good all losses, and that the remaining forty-five were liable to make up any shortfall. His judgment read as follows.

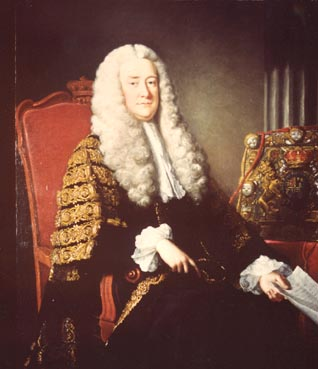
A 1735 portrait of Lord Hardwicke

I take the employment of a director to be of a mixed nature. It partakes of the nature of a public office, as it arises from the charter of the crown.

But it cannot be said to be an employment affecting the public government; and for this reason none of the directors of the great companies, the Bank, South-sea &c., are required to qualify themselves by taking the sacrament.

Therefore committee-men are most properly agents to those who employ them in this trust, and who empower them to direct and superintend the affairs of the corporation.

In this respect, they may be guilty of acts of commission or omission, of mal-feasance or non-feasance. Vide Domat's Civil Law upon this head, 2 B Tit. 3, Sec. 1 & 2.

Now where acts are executed within their authority, as repealing bye-laws and making orders, in such cases though attended with bad consequences, it will be very difficult to determine that these are breaches of trust.

For it is by no means just in a judge, after bad consequences have arisen from such executions of their power, to say that they foresaw at the time what must necessarily happen; and therefore were guilty of a breach of trust.

Next as to mal-feasance and non-feasance.

To instance, in non-attendance; if some persons are guilty of gross non-attendance and leave the management intirely to others, they may be guilty by this means of the breaches of trust that are committed by others.

By accepting a trust of this sort, a person is obliged to execute it with fidelity and reasonable diligence, and it is no excuse to say that they had no benefit from it, but that it was merely honorary (ante 60); and therefore they are within the case of common trustees. Vide Coggs v Bernard, 1 Salk. 26.

Another objection has been made that the court can make no decree upon these persons which will be just, for it is said every man's non-attendance or omission of his duty is his own default, and that each particular person must bear just such a proportion as is suitable to the loss arising from his particular neglect, which makes it a case out of the power of the court.

Now if this doctrine should prevail, it is indeed laying the axe to the root of the tree.

But if, upon inquiry before the master, there should appear to be a supine negligence in all of them by which a gross complicated loss happens, I will never determine they are not all guilty. (So 3 P. W. 215)

Nor will I ever determine that a court of equity cannot lay hold of every breach of trust, let the person be guilty of it either in a private or public capacity.

The tribunals of this kingdom are wisely formed both of courts of law and equity, and so are the tribunals of most other nations; and for this reason there can be no injury, but there must be a remedy in all or some of them; and therefore I will never determine that frauds of this kind are out of the reach of courts of law or equity, for an intolerable grievance would follow from such a determination.

In the present case one thing is clear, that Sir Arichibad Grand, Robinson, Thompson, Burrows and Squire, who were the five that were engaged in that confederacy, are certainly liable to make good the losses which the corporation have sustained in the first place and the committee-men who were not partners in this affair are liable in the second place only.

== See also ==
- Directors' duties
- UK company law
- United States corporate law
