= Philip Yorke, 1st Earl of Hardwicke =

British lawyer and statesman (1690–1764)

The Right Honourable The Earl of Hardwicke PC
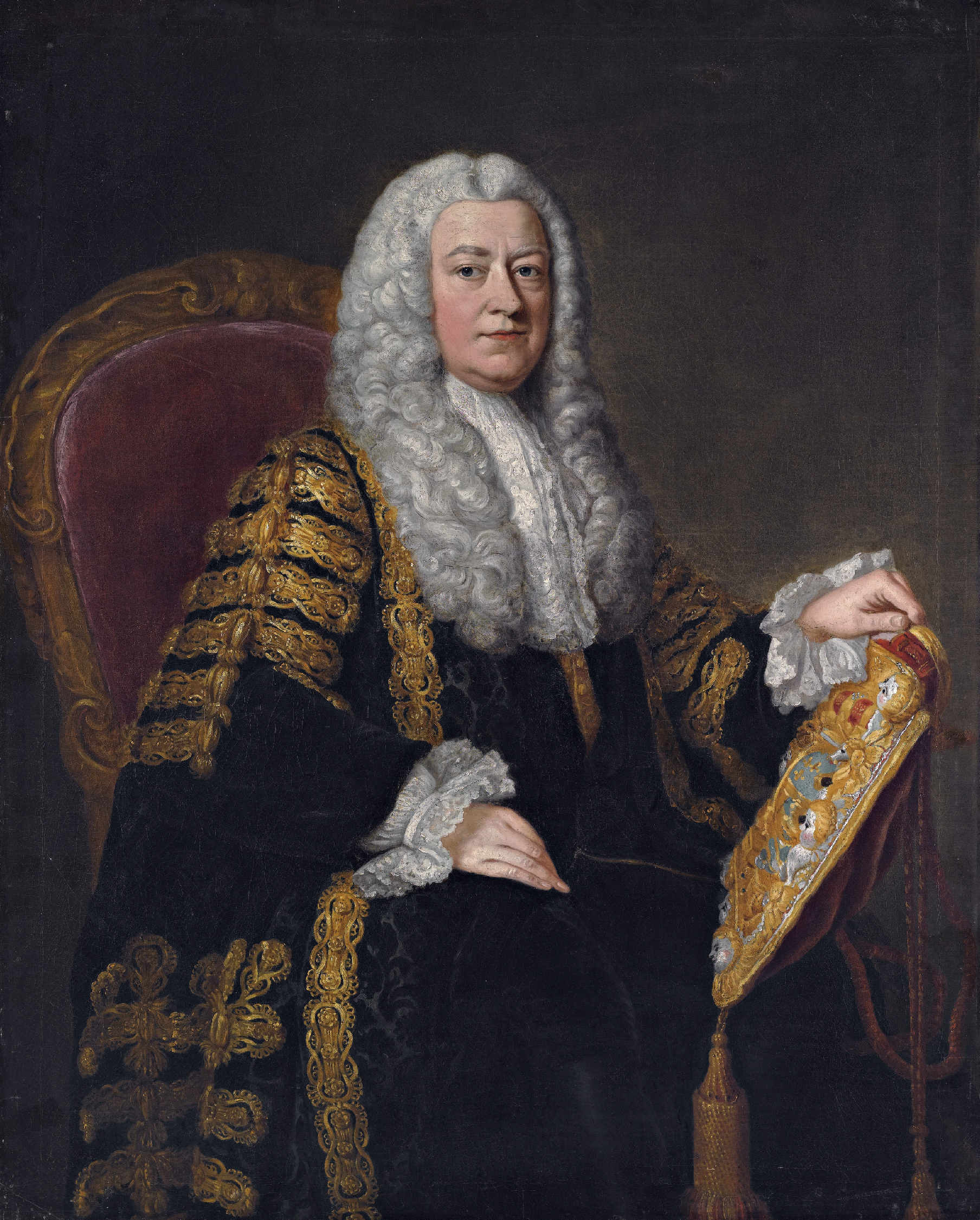
- Portrait by William Hoare

Lord Chancellor Lord High Steward for the trials of: List: The Earl of Kilmarnock; The Earl of Cromartie; The Lord Balmerino; The Lord Lovat
- In office 21 February 1737 – 19 November 1756
- Monarch: George II
- Prime Minister: Sir Robert Walpole; The Earl of Wilmington; Henry Pelham; The Duke of Newcastle
- Preceded by: The Lord Talbot
- Succeeded by: In Commission

12th Chancellor of the College of William & Mary
- In office 1764–1764

Personal details
- Born: c. 1 December 1690 Dover, Kent, England
- Died: 6 March 1764 (aged 73) London, England
- Spouse(s): Margaret, Lady Yorke
- Children: 7
- Education: Middle Temple
- Profession: Lawyer

Philip Yorke, 1st Earl of Hardwicke, PC (1 December 1690 – 6 March 1764) was an English lawyer and politician who served as Lord High Chancellor of Great Britain. He was a close confidant of the Duke of Newcastle, Prime Minister between 1754 and 1756 and 1757 until 1762.

== Background ==
A son of Philip Yorke, an attorney, he was born at Dover. Through his mother, Elizabeth, daughter and co-heiress of Richard Gibbon of Rolvenden, Kent, he was connected with the family of Edward Gibbon the historian. He was educated at a school in Bethnal Green run by Samuel Morland, a nonconformist.

At age 16, Yorke entered the attorney's office of Charles Salkeld in Holborn, London. He was entered at the Middle Temple in November 1708, and perhaps recommended by his employer to Lord Chief Justice Parker as law tutor to his sons.

In 1715, Yorke was called to the bar, where his progress was, according to Lord Campbell, more rapid than that of any other debutant in the annals of the profession, his advancement being greatly furthered by the patronage of Thomas Parker, 1st Earl of Macclesfield, who became Lord Chancellor in 1718, when Yorke transferred his practice from the King's Bench to the Court of Chancery, though he continued to go on the Western Circuit. In the following year he established his reputation as an equity lawyer in a case in which Robert Walpole's family was interested, by an argument displaying profound learning and research concerning the jurisdiction of the chancellor, on lines which he afterwards more fully developed in a celebrated letter to Lord Kames on the distinction between law and equity.

Through the Earl of Macclesfield's influence with the Duke of Newcastle Yorke entered parliament in 1719 as member for Lewes, and was appointed solicitor-general, with a knighthood, in 1720, although he was then a barrister of only four years standing.

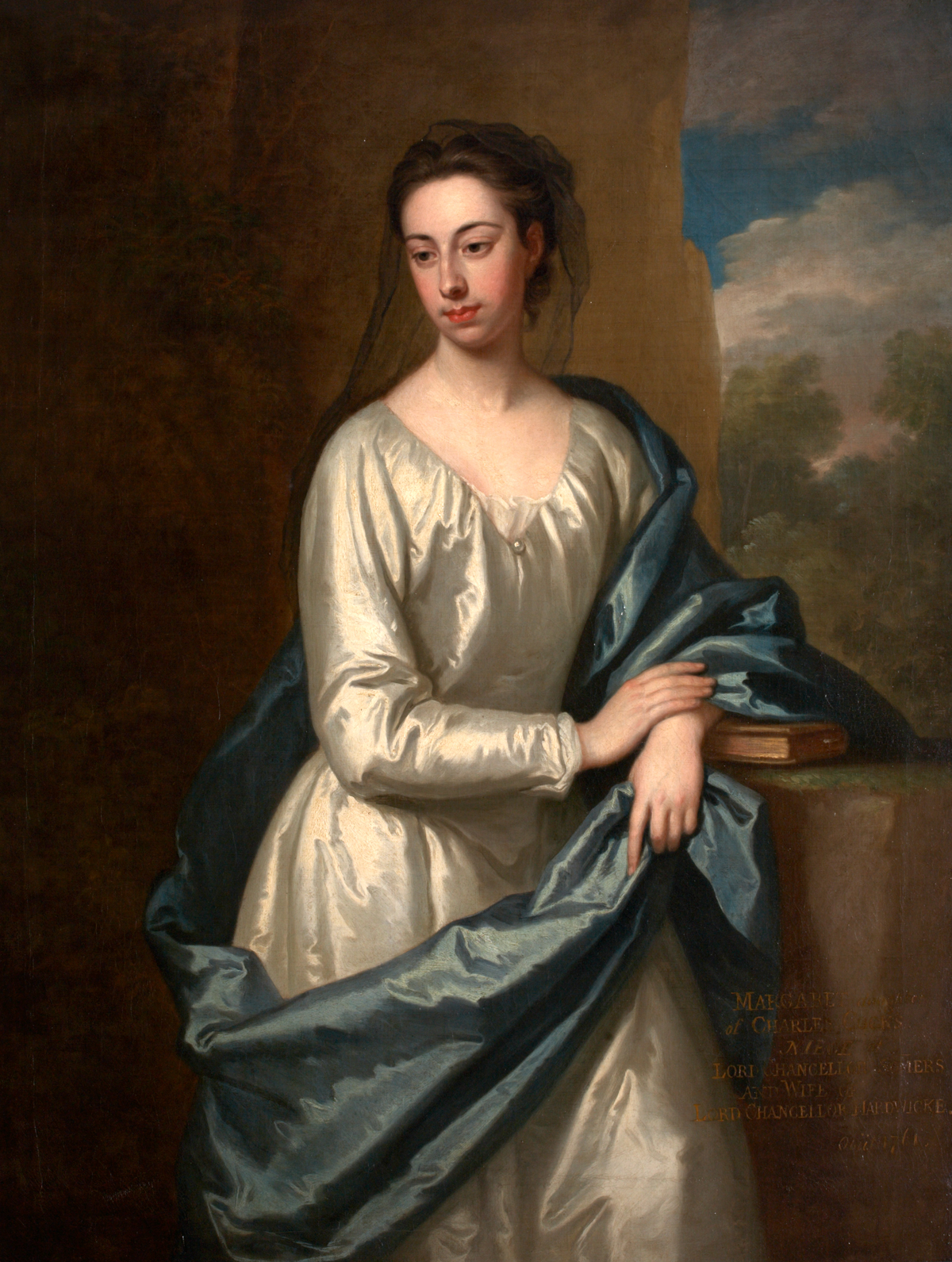
Philip Yorke married Margaret Cocks, by whom he had five sons and two daughters.

Although in his youth he contributed to The Spectator over the signature Philip Homebred, he seems early to have abandoned all care for literature, and he has been reproached by Lord Campbell and others with his neglect of art and letters. On 16 May 1719 he married Margaret, daughter of Charles Cocks (by his wife Mary Cocks, sister of Lord Chancellor Somers) and widow of William Lygon (who died without issue in 1716), by whom he had five sons and two daughters:

- Philip Yorke, Viscount Royston (1720–1790), who succeeded him
- Hon. Charles Yorke (1722–1770), became, like his father, Lord Chancellor
- Lady Elizabeth Yorke (1725–1760), married Lord Anson
- Hon. Joseph Yorke (d. 1792), a diplomat, created Baron Dover
- Hon. John Yorke (1728–1801), Member of Parliament for Reigate and Higham Ferrers
- Hon. James Yorke (1730–1808), became Bishop of Ely
- Lady Margaret Yorke, married Sir Gilbert Heathcote, Bt

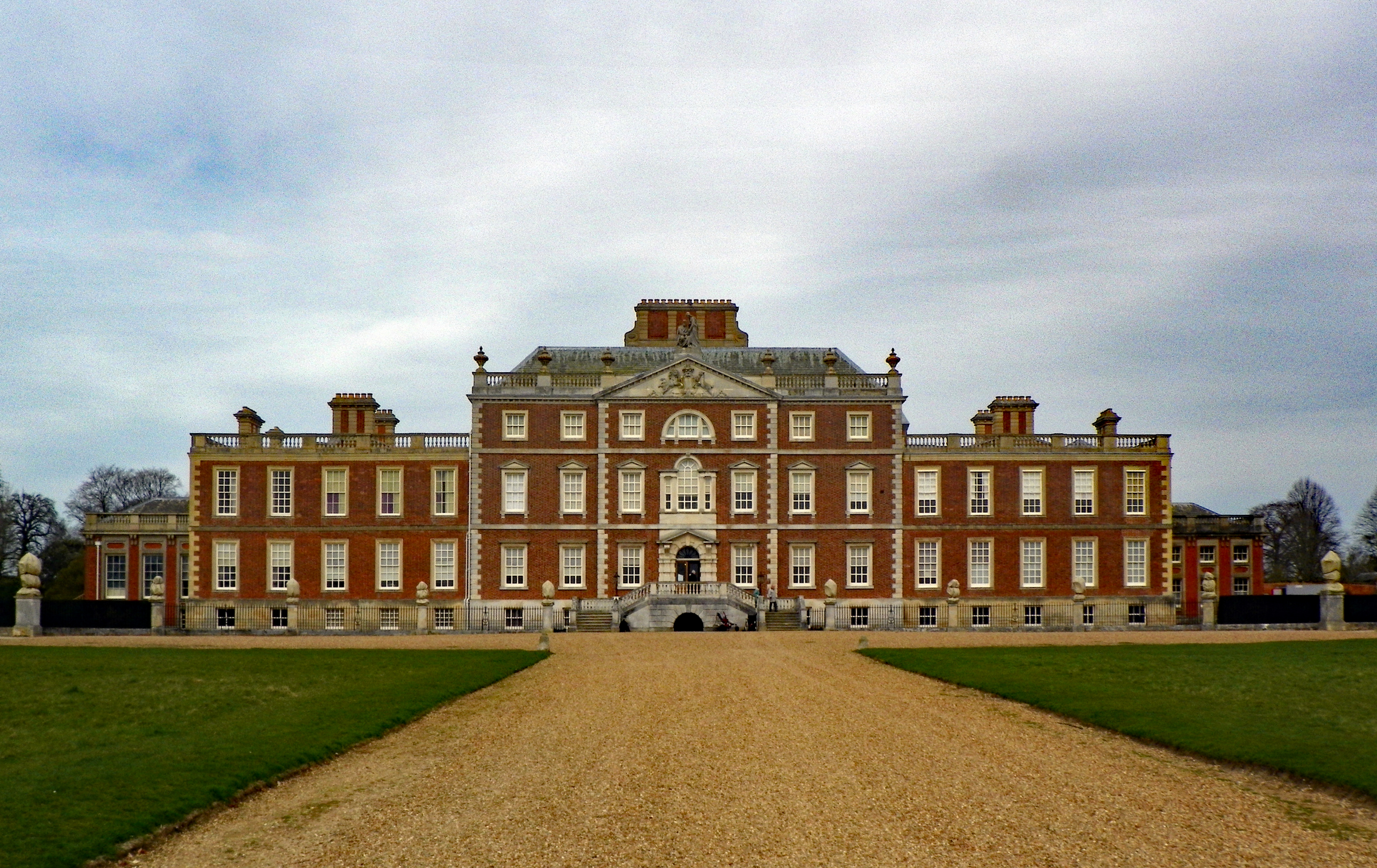
Wimpole Hall

In 1739, he purchased Wimpole Hall, the greatest country house in Cambridgeshire.

He is buried, with many of his descendants, at the St. Andrew Churchyard at Wimpole. Hardwicke was succeeded in the earldom by his eldest son, Philip. His monument was sculpted by Peter Scheemakers.

His cousin Sir William Yorke, 1st Baronet had a highly successful career as a judge in Ireland, becoming Chief Justice of the Irish Common Pleas.

== Career ==
=== Attorney-General ===
The prosecution of Christopher Layer for treason as a Jacobite raised Yorke's reputation as a forensic orator; and in 1723, having already become attorney-general, he passed through the House of Commons the bill of pains and penalties against Francis Atterbury. He was excused, on the ground of his personal friendship, from acting for the crown in the impeachment of the Earl of Macclesfield in 1725; he soon found a new patron in the Duke of Newcastle.

Lord Hardwicke is also remembered as one of the two authors of the Yorke–Talbot slavery opinion whilst he was a crown law officer in 1729. The opinion was sought to determinate the legality of slavery and Hardwicke (then Philip Yorke) and Charles Talbot opined that it was legal. The opinion was disseminated and relied upon widely. Lord Hardwicke would subsequently endorse the views in the opinion in a judicial capacity in Pearne v Lisle (1749) Amb 75, 27 ER 47. He rendered valuable service to Walpole's government by his support of the bill for prohibiting loans to foreign powers (1730), of the increase of the army (1732) and of the Excise Bill (1733).

=== Walpole government ===
In 1733 Yorke was appointed Lord Chief Justice of the King's Bench, with the title of Lord Hardwicke, and was sworn of the Privy Council; and in 1737 he succeeded Lord Talbot as Lord Chancellor, thus becoming a member of Walpole's cabinet. One of his first official acts was to deprive the poet James Thomson of a small office conferred on him by Talbot.

=== House of Lords ===
Hardwicke's political importance was greatly increased by his move to the House of Lords, where the incompetency of Newcastle threw on the Chancellor the duty of defending the measures of the government. He resisted Carteret's motion to reduce the army in 1738, and the resolutions hostile to Spain over the affair of Captain Jenkins's ears. But when Walpole bent before the storm and declared war against Spain, Hardwicke advocated energetic measures for its conduct; and he tried to keep the peace between Newcastle and Walpole. He found that there was no sufficient ground for Horace Walpole's charge that the fall of Sir Robert was brought about by Hardwicke's treachery.

=== Wilmington government ===
No one was more surprised than himself when he retained the chancellorship in the following administration, and he resisted the proposal to indemnify witnesses against Walpole in one of his finest speeches in May 1742. He exercised a leading influence in the Wilmington Cabinet; and when Wilmington died in August 1743, it was Hardwicke who put forward Henry Pelham for the vacant office against the claims of Pulteney. For many years from this time he was the controlling power in the government.

During the King's absences on the continent Hardwicke was left at the head of the council of regency; it thus fell to him to concert measures for dealing with the Jacobite rising in 1745. After Culloden he presided at the trial of the Scottish Jacobite peers, his conduct of which, though judicially impartial, was neither dignified nor generous; and he must be held partly responsible for the severity meted out to the rebels, and especially for the executions on obsolete attainders of Charles Radclyffe and (in 1753) of Archibald Cameron of Locheil. He carried out a major reform in 1746 which swept away the feudal power surviving in Scotland in the form of private heritable jurisdictions in the hands of the landed gentry. On the other hand, his legislation in 1748 for disarming the Highlanders and prohibiting the use of the tartan in their dress was vexatious without being effective. Hardwicke supported Chesterfield's reform of the calendar in 1751; in 1753 his bill for legalizing the naturalization of Jews in England had to be dropped on account of the popular clamour it excited; but he successfully carried a Marriage Act which became the basis of subsequent legislation.

=== Newcastle government ===
On the death of Pelham in 1754 Hardwicke obtained for Newcastle the post of prime minister, and for reward was created earl of Hardwicke and Viscount Royston; and when in November 1756 the weakness of the ministry and the threatening aspect of foreign affairs compelled Newcastle to resign, Hardwicke retired with him. He played a part in negotiating the coalition between Newcastle and Pitt in 1757, when he accepted a seat in Pitt's cabinet without returning to the woolsack. After the accession of George III Hardwicke opposed the ministry of Lord Bute on the peace with France in 1762, and on the cider tax in the following year. In the Wilkes case Hardwicke condemned general warrants, and also the doctrine that seditious libels published by members of parliament were protected by parliamentary privilege. He died in London on 6 March 1764.

== Influence ==
In 1736 the King's Bench, under his presidency, delivered the seminal judgment in Middleton v. Crofts 2 Atk 650, which held that canons made in the provincial clergy convocations could not, by themselves, bind the lay faithful. He held the office of Lord Chancellor longer than any of his predecessors, with a single exception. His decisions fixed limits and established principles of Equity. His influence was powerful in obliterating the traditions of the judicial bench under the Stuart monarchy, and in establishing the modern conception of the duties and demeanour of English judges. While still at the bar Lord Chesterfield praised his conduct of crown prosecutions as a contrast to the former bloodhounds of the crown; and he described Sir Philip Yorke as naturally humane, moderate and decent.

== Cases and legislation ==
Cases

- Gyles v Wilcox (1740) 3 Atk. 143, on fair use
- Attorney General v Davy (1741) 26 ER 531, on majority decision making in corporations
- The Charitable Corporation v Sutton (1742) 26 ER 642, on the duty of care
- Whelpdale v Cookson (1747) 1 Ves Sen 9, on the duty of loyalty and no inquiry rule
- Pearne v. Lisle (1749) Amb 75, 27 ER 47
- Penn v Lord Baltimore (1750) 1 Ves Sen 444, in relation to the Penn–Calvert boundary dispute

Legislation

- Marriage Act 1753

== See also ==
- Great Britain in the Seven Years War

Parliament of Great Britain
Preceded by Thomas Pelham; John Morley Trevor	Member of Parliament for Lewes; 1719–1722; With: Thomas Pelham	Succeeded by Thomas Pelham; Henry Pelham (of Stanmer)
Preceded by George Naylor; Henry Pelham	Member of Parliament for Seaford; 1722–1733; With: Sir William Gage, Bt	Succeeded by Sir William Gage, Bt; William Hay
Legal offices
Preceded by Sir William Thomson	Solicitor General for England and Wales; 1720–1724	Succeeded by Sir Clement Wearg
Preceded by Sir Robert Raymond	Attorney General for England and Wales; 1724–1733	Succeeded by Sir John Willes
Preceded by Sir Robert Raymond	Lord Chief Justice of the King's Bench; 1733–1737	Succeeded by Sir William Lee
Political offices
Preceded by The Lord Talbot	Lord High Chancellor of Great Britain; 1737–1756	In commission Title next held by The Lord Henley as Lord Keeper
Peerage of Great Britain
New title	Earl of Hardwicke; 1754–1764	Succeeded by Philip Yorke
New title	Baron Hardwicke; 1733–1764	Succeeded by Philip Yorke
