= HMS Anson =

Eight ships or submarines of the Royal Navy have been named HMS Anson, after Admiral George Anson:

- HMS Anson (1747), a 60-gun fourth rate launched in 1747 and sold in 1773.
- HMS Anson (1763), a 6-gun cutter that was constructed by the French as L'Iroquois in 1759. The British captured the ship in 1760 and renamed her Anson. In 1763 Anson struck a shoal off Susan Island, New York. in the Saint Lawrence River and sank.
- HMS Anson (1781), a 64-gun third rate launched in 1781, cut down around 1794 to a large frigate of 44 guns and wrecked in 1807.
- HMS Anson (1812), a 74-gun third-rate, used on harbour service from 1831, as a convict ship from 1844 and was broken up in 1851.
- HMS Anson (1860), a 91-gun screw-propelled battleship launched in 1860, renamed Algiers in 1883 and broken up in 1904.
- HMS Anson (1886), an Admiral-class ironclad launched in 1886 and sold in 1909.
- HMS Anson (1916), a proposed Admiral-class battlecruiser, ordered in 1916 and cancelled in 1918.
- HMS Anson was the planned name of HMS Duke of York, but she was renamed prior to launch and the name was reassigned.
- HMS Anson (79), a King George V-class battleship launched in 1940 and broken up in 1957.
  - HMS Centurion (1911), a King George V-class battleship launched in 1911 and sunk as a breakwater in 1944, was disguised as HMS Anson (79) as part of Operation Vigorous.
- HMS Anson (S123), the fifth Astute-class submarine, launched on 20 April 2021.

== Battle honours ==
Ships named Anson have earned the following battle honours: (Note: In the Royal Navy, and other Commonwealth navies that follow the traditions of the RN, battle honours awarded to a ship are inherited by subsequent ships to bear the same name, and are displayed on the ship's honours board.)

- The Saints, 1782
- Donegal, 1798
- Curacoa, 1807
- Arctic, 1942−43
