= Gyles v Wilcox =

1740 English court case which set the groundwork for fair use

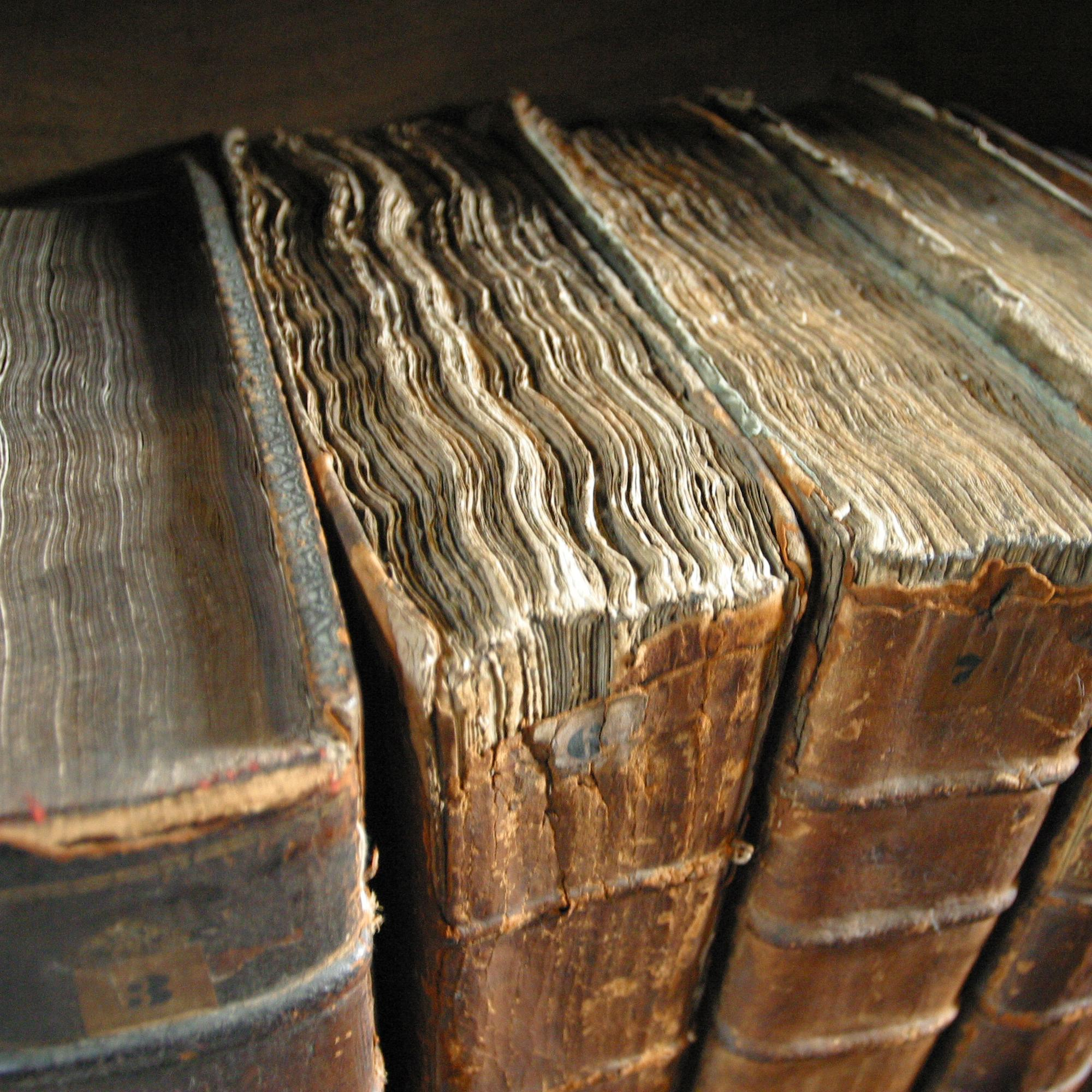
- Court: Court of Chancery
- Full case name: Gyles v Wilcox, Barrow, and Nutt
- Decided: 6 March 1740
- Citation: (1740) 3 Atk 143; 26 ER 489

Court membership
- Judge sitting: Philip Yorke, 1st Earl of Hardwicke

Keywords
- Fair use

Gyles v Wilcox (1740) 26 ER 489 was a decision of the Court of Chancery of England that established the doctrine of fair abridgement, which in the United States would later evolve into the concept of fair use. The case was heard and the opinion written by Philip Yorke, 1st Earl of Hardwicke, and concerned Fletcher Gyles, a bookseller who had published a copy of Matthew Hale's Pleas of the Crown. Soon after the initial publication, the publishers Wilcox and Nutt hired a writer named Barrow to abridge the book, and repackaged it as Modern Crown Law. Gyles sued for a stay on the book's publishing, claiming his rights under the Statute of Anne had been infringed.

The main issues in the case were whether or not abridgements of a work inherently constituted copyright infringement, or whether they could qualify as a separate, new work. Lord Hartwicke ruled that abridgements fell under two categories: "true abridgements" and "coloured shortenings". True abridgements presented a true effort on the part of the editor, and by this effort, constituted a new work which did not infringe upon the copyright of the original. Leaving it to literary and legal experts to decide, Hartwicke ruled that Modern Crown Law was not a true abridgement, but merely a duplication intending to circumvent the law.

The case set a legal precedent which has shaped United States copyright law to the present day. It established the common law doctrine of fair abridgement, which was cited in other cases, ultimately building up to the idea of fair use. The opinion also recognised the author's right to a work through the nature of the labour it took to produce it, shifting copyright away from publishing rights and towards the idea of serving the greater good by encouraging the production of new, useful works.

== Facts ==
Fletcher Gyles, an English bookseller, had previously published a book entitled Matthew Hale's Pleas of the Crown, for which he had purchased the exclusive publishing rights. Around the same time, publishers Wilcox and Nutt paid a writer named Barrow to abridge the book, circulating it under the title Modern Crown Law. Gyles alleged that Modern Crown Law was a near verbatim copy of his publication, with only minor alterations, including the translation of Latin and French passages into English and cutting old, obsolete laws. Seeking to protect his printing rights, Gyles sued both Wilcox and Nutt, along with Barrow, for a stay on the publication.

== Arguments ==
The case involved whether Wilcox, Barrow, and Nutt had violated Gyles' publishing rights as defined under the Statute of Anne, particularly the section stating that an author, or purchaser of an author's copyrights as Gyles was, "shall have the sole Liberty of Printing and Reprinting such Book and Books for the Term of four-teen years." Philip Yorke, 1st Earl of Hardwicke presided over and decided the case.

Browning, Gyles' attorney, cited a case which had also appeared before Hardwicke, that of Read v Hodges. In that case, a publisher attempted to circumvent the rights of the author of Czar Peter the Great by including all three volumes in one and cutting several pages. Hardwicke rejected the argument, however, declaring that the former case had been decided merely on a motion, and that he had given his decision and statements without the thought he would have given a normal hearing. Hardwicke further took contention with the Attorney General for England and Wales' assertion that the Statute of Anne provided a publishing monopoly, instead interpreting the act as one meant to promote public education and the public good.

As Hardwicke had decided to interpret the Statute of Anne as for the public good, the main question of the case became which "any such book or books" the act referred to and protected. The defendants argued that his abridgement must be considered separate from the original work published by Gyles. The defendant's lawyers furthered pushed the court to try the case as if the abridgement had been recorded in the Stationers' Register, an action that would have given Wilcox and Nutt the right to publish their book, and the lawsuit brought against a second, unique book. Therefore, the only question before the court was whether the second book differentiated sufficiently from the first. Further, the attorneys for the defendants argued that the book was not a direct transcription, but that several chapters had been omitted, while other, original sections had been added to the Wilcox and Nutt publication. They further pointed to the fact that the Gyles' publication consisted of 275 sheets, whereas the abridgement contained only 35 sheets.

== Judgment ==
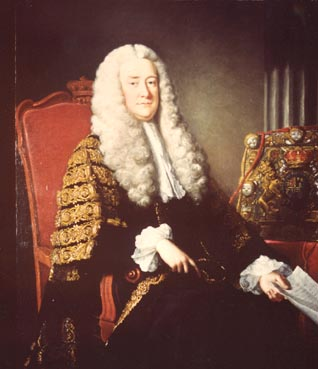
Lord Hardwicke, the jurist who presided over the case.

The opinion, written by Hardwicke, found that a true abridgement of a published book may be considered an entirely separate, new work, as the abridgement showed the labour, originality, education, and judgement of the editor. This new book did not run the risk of infringing the rights of the author or bookseller who owned the publishing rights. However, Lord Hardwicke drew a distinction between works "fairly made" and those "colourably shortened". Hardwicke refused to compare the books himself to determine whether Modern Crown Law was indeed a fair abridgement, or to force a judge and jury to sit and hear both books read, instead opting to have two legal experts and a literary master read the books and report the findings to the court. The parties were allowed to choose these examiners, in a way leaving the case to arbitration. After a week in which the parties were given a chance to make amends outside of court, the book in question was ruled a colourable shortening, created only to circumvent the law, and thus was an infringement of Gyles' printing rights.

In his decision, Hartwicke went counter to the prevailing view that the Statute of Anne should be interpreted very strictly, proclaiming, "I am quite of a different opinion, and that it ought to receive a liberal construction, for it is far from being a monopoly, as it is intended to secure the property of books in the authors themselves, or the purchasers of the copy, as some recompense for their pains and labour in such works as may be of use to the learned world."

== Consequences ==
The case established the doctrine of fair abridgement, which allowed that abridgements displaying a fair amount of labour on the part of the editor, and that differed from the original published work in a significant way, could not be copyright violations. This in effect raised the abridger to the level of an author. The decision did not define the exact parameters that would qualify a work as a valid abridgement. This distinction came with a later case involving an abridgement of Hawksworth's Voyages, in a decision written by Lord Chancellor Apsley. In the United States, this concept of fair abridgement eventually evolved through common law, initiated from Gyles v Wilcox, into the current concept of fair use. Hardwicke's decision also added the exercise of personal judgement to the list of admissible defences against the charge of copyright infringement, adding to the growing case law establishing that British copyright would be based on labour and not on originality. The opinion advanced the position that copyright law should serve the public interest by promoting the creation of new educational and useful works, rather than focusing on publishing rights. The case played a significant role in the development of English copyright law. The United States federal courts have cited the case as recently as the 1980s.
