= Sir Gilbert Heathcote, 3rd Baronet =

British Member of Parliament

Sir Gilbert Heathcote, 3rd Baronet (died 2 November 1785) of Normanton Park, Rutland was a British Member of Parliament.

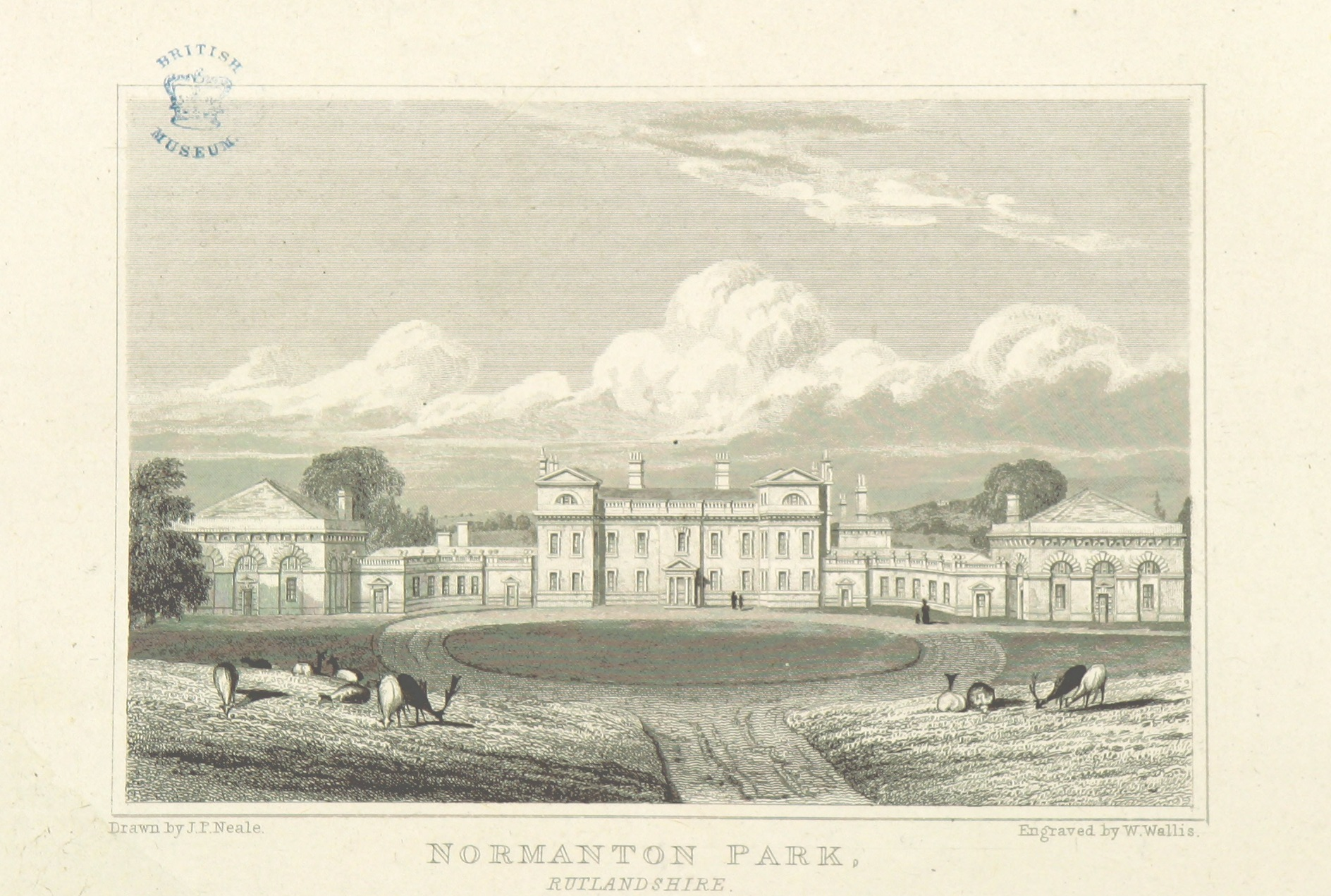
Normanton Park (1818) by John Preston Neale

Heathcote was the son of Sir John Heathcote, 2nd Baronet, and Bridget, daughter of Thomas White and was educated at Queens' College, Cambridge. He succeeded to the baronetcy and to Normanton Park on his father's death in 1759. In 1761, he was elected to the House of Commons for Shaftesbury, a seat he held until 1768.

Heathcote married firstly Lady Margaret, daughter of Philip Yorke, 1st Earl of Hardwicke, in 1749. After his first wife's death in 1769, he married secondly Elizabeth, daughter of Robert Hudson, in 1770. He died in November 1785 and was succeeded by his son from his second marriage, Gilbert. His widow Elizabeth retired to Upper Brook Street, where she lived until her death in 1813.

Parliament of Great Britain
| Preceded by Hon. James Brudenell; Sir Thomas Clavering, Bt | Member of Parliament for Shaftesbury; 1761–1768; With: Samuel Touchet | Succeeded by William Chaffin Grove; Ralph Payne |
Baronetage of Great Britain
| Preceded by John Heathcote | Baronet (of the City of London); 1759–1785 | Succeeded by Gilbert Heathcote |
