= Lady Margaret Heathcote =

British noble and poet

- Born: Lady Margaret Yorke; 21 March 1733 (possibly) Lincoln's Inn Fields, London, England
- Died: 19 August 1769 (aged 36) (possibly) Grosvenor Square, London, England
- Resting place: Church of St Mary the Virgin, Edith Weston, Rutland, England
- Occupation: Poet
- Spouse: Sir Gilbert Heathcote, 3rd Baronet (m. 1749; died 1769)
- Father: Philip Yorke, 1st Earl of Hardwicke

Lady Margaret Heathcote (née Yorke; 21 March 1733 – 19 August 1769) was a British aristocrat and poet. The daughter of Philip Yorke, 1st Earl of Hardwicke and husband of Sir Gilbert Heathcote, 3rd Baronet, she wrote several poems throughout her life, some of which were posthumously published.

== Biography ==
Lady Margaret Yorke was born on 21 March 1733 (Note: Hubberstey says that Heathcote may have been born in the Arch Row area of Lincoln's Inn Fields, where her parents lived.) as the youngest child of Margaret (née Cocks) and Philip Yorke, 1st Earl of Hardwicke, a Member of Parliament who became Lord Chief Justice of the King's Bench around the same time. She married Gilbert Heathcote on 22 June 1749, later a baronet and British MP; they had no surviving children. Although her marriage was financially beneficial, her husband lacked the ambitiousness of his grandfather Sir Gilbert Heathcote, 1st Baronet, and she had a poor relationship with the Heathcote family.

Despite feeling "utterly incapable [...] of affording either amusement or intelligence", she had a minor career in the arts. She was skilled in poetry during her youth, with one of them appearing in a personal anthology from Lady Mary Capell and another, "Epistle addressed to Lady Grey at Wrest Park" (1747), posthumously appearing in The Gentleman's Magazine, which also published an Italian-language translation she worked on in 1818, and Bell's Classical Arrangement of Fugitive Poetry in the 1780s. She also wrote poems in her letters to her sister Lady Elizabeth Anson and her sister-in-law Lady Amabel Yorke, Countess of Hardwicke, as well as Catherine Talbot. She also did satire, at one point exploring the Seven Years' War in her poetry. In 2024, Jemima Hubberstey called it her "most enduring legacy". Outside of poetry, she had some fine art experience, being a student of Louis Goupy and a drawing teacher of Anne FitzPatrick, Countess of Upper Ossory.

Heathcote, spending her last years in declining health and stressed from pressure to beget an heir for the family, died on 19 August 1769 from complications from childbirth. (Note: Hubberstey says that she may have died at her familial home in 26 (later 29) Grosvenor Square in Mayfair, London.) Originally buried at St Matthew's Church, Normanton, she was later re-interred at Church of St Mary the Virgin, Edith Weston in 1970 as part of construction of Rutland Water.
