= Charitable Corporation =

The Charitable Corporation was an institution in Britain intended to provide loans at low interest to the deserving poor, including through large-scale pawnbroking. It was established by charter in 1707. Its full title was "Charitable Corporation for the relief of the industrious poor by assisting them with small sums upon pledges at legal interest". It became dishonest, and Smollett called it a "nefarious corporation". Certain of the directors speculated wildly and lost most of the shareholders' money.

== Origin ==
The original object was that small tradesmen might obtain loans by depositing a pledge in the corporation's warehouse, so that they might not have to sell goods at an undervalue when suffering cash flow difficulties. The initial capital was £30,000. This was increased to £100,000 in 1722, then £300,000 in 1728, and finally £600,000 in 1730. In effect, the corporation was a pawnbroker.

The company published a pamphlet in 1719, setting out its practice. The procedure was that a borrower took goods to one of the corporation's warehouses and signed a bill of sale. The warehouse keeper valued the pledge and he and an assistant signed a certificate. This was passed to the bookkeeper for entering into the corporation's accounts, and then to the cashier who paid the borrower his loan. Both the warehouse keeper and the cashier were required to give security, and there were surveyors of warehouses to act as a check on the warehouse keepers. Furthermore, the books were signed every night. Unredeemed pledges could be sold after a year. The borrower had not only to pay lawful interest (five percent) but also fees of a similar amount, so that the company was actually receiving considerably more than "lawful interest". These systems should have been sufficient to prevent fraud, but in the late 1720s, compliance with the procedure became lax, opening the way to fraud on a massive scale.

The original warehouse was at Duke Street, Westminster, but was in the company's early years replaced by one at Spring Garden near Charing Cross, London. By the mid-1720s, the main warehouse was in Fenchurch Street, London but that at Spring Garden was retained. The Spring Garden warehouse was on the site of 39–41 Charing Cross.

== Expansion ==
According to the subsequent report of a House of Commons committee, little business was done until 1725, when a new committee (board of directors) was appointed in October 1725, consisting of Sir Robert Sutton, Sir John Meres, Sir Fisher Tench, Dennis Bond, Archibald Grant (later Bt), and others. They proceeded to appoint officers, including John Thomson as warehouse keeper and Mr Clarke as surveyor in November 1725. Following a deficiency at the Spring Garden warehouse, the surveyor was required to report weekly to the committee concerning pledges at the Fenchurch Street warehouse, but Thomson the warehouse keeper instead procured his dismissal in May 1726. William Burroughs joined the committee in March 1727, and William Aislabie and Hon. Walter Molesworth in December 1729. Assistants were also appointed from 1726, including William Squire, George Jackson and John Torriano (disqualified from office in 1729).

The accomptant's key was removed from him and handed at Thomson's request to a menial employee, giving him control of all three keys. Thomson's creatures Richard Woolley and Thomas Warren were appointed as his assistants. This had the effect of removing the checks on the officers. Previously, two officers had been needed to conduct any business, but the effect was to give Thomson unrestricted access to the warehouse. When they discovered that the checks had been removed, Sir John Meres resigned from the committee, as did Sir Fisher Tench, though Viscount Percival blamed him for allowing his son to remain as cashier. Sir Fisher Tench left on 22 December 1726, and Sir John Meres on 23 December 1729. In 1726 and 1727 orders had been made for weekly accounts to be available for the committee to inspect, but this was not done. Thomson also did the cashier's work in the absence of William Tench, and the accomptant's in the absence of Jeremiah Wainwright, but Walter Molesworth, George Jackson and John Torriano. The committee also authorised more than £1,000 to be lent on one pledge – up to £2,000, and more with the consent of the committee.

== Issue of notes ==
To increase the funds available to them, the committee decided (contrary to the provisions of their charter) to issue notes. Initially, they employed Thomas Jones to circulate these. Later they authorised George Robinson do so. By October 1731, over £101,000 in notes had been issued.

== The partnerships of five and of four ==
A little while after Thomson became warehouse keeper, several of those involved in the management of the Corporation started speculating in shares on a very large scale. This seems to have begun because Grant owed money to Thomson, and both he and Burroughs had debts to Robinson from earlier stockjobbing. The partnership of five consisted of Sir Alexander Grant, William Burroughs, William Squire, George Robinson, and John Thomson. In October 1727, they began to buy the corporation's shares, this all being handled by Robinson who was a stockbroker in Exchange Alley. They then heard of lead mines in Scotland belonging to Sir Robert Sutton and others, whose sale they proposed to the York Buildings Company. They bought shares in it, and those shares rose in value.

While Grant was in Scotland, they needed to buy more shares at a time of difficulty in February 1728, due to the petition of the City of London. The chronology of this is confused as the petition was later (see below). These shares were bought for the account of four partners (excluding Grant, who was in Scotland about mines). All this was financed by borrowing money from the company on false pledges. At one point they thought that the profits would redeem all pledges, except Robinson's. The management of affairs was left to Thompson. The purchases were made by various persons as trustees, but Robinson persuaded the trustees that their pledges to transfer the stock to the rest of the syndicate were lost, and got the shares issued to himself, further swindling his partners to the amount of £100,000.

The partnership of five also invested in the Duke of Argyll's mines in Morvern and Mull, Grant and Burroughs buying (at a premium) in April 1730 the lease granted to Sir Alexander Murray in 1727. The Morvern mines were in fact at Glendow. They took mines on Kinlochalin and on the estate of MacLean of Kingairloch, also mines at Aar and Sandhall in Norway. All these were financed by loans on false pledges.

== Brokers to the company ==
Richard Woolley and Thomas Warren acted as brokers to the company (in opposition to Thomas Jones, who claimed the sole right), procuring pledges for the company and earning a one percent commission for themselves. However, they presented bills of sale long after the money was advanced. When William Tench suggested to Thomson that the money was misapplied, he threatened exposure, until Robinson paid him an additional salary. The order authorising loans over £1,000 was obtained specifically so that money might be obtained on false pledges for Robinson to buy the company's shares. Richard Woolley and William Squire had a separate business dealing on commission with country clothiers, and hoped they would support them with petitions, but Woolley lost this business by becoming a gentleman with a carriage and country house.

== Petitions ==
In the end, the Common Council of the City of London petitioned the Parliament of Great Britain in March 1731, for relief against the "unreasonable and exorbitant rates" charged and the low prices achieved on sale of unredeemed goods. This was supported by a petition from merchants and other traders in London and by the silk weavers and worsted manufacturers of Spitalfields. They alleged that pledges were often sold at 20 percent below the production cost; this discouraged industry and encouraged fraudulent bankrupts. The company procured opposing petitions, which claimed that the company did nothing contrary to their charter and their powers "greatly conduce to prevent usury". Pamphlets published at the time referred to pawnbrokers charging 30 percent. The matter was rapidly considered by House of Commons (in Committee of the Whole House) who heard witnesses, several of whom were in prison for debt. The committee reported:

The Charitable Corporation have lent money in large sums which under colour and pretence of reasonable costs and charges they have exacted after the rate of [5 percent] over and above lawful interest, and therefore ought to be regulated.

A bill was introduced accordingly, but had only been passed by the Commons, when the king prorogued Parliament. on 7 May 1731

== Collapse ==
George Robinson was elected as Member of Parliament for Marlow, but soon after the whole financial edifice collapsed. In October 1731, Thomson and Robinson absconded, going off suddenly to France. Robinson was back by 25 November and appeared before the General Court of the Company. By 18 December, he was in hiding again because the company would not supersede the commission of bankruptcy against him. He had "seen fit to absent himself from the kingdom", according to William Goostry, his attorney. The bankruptcies of Robinson (called a banker and broker) and Thomson (called a merchant) were advertised on 26 October.

The General Court of the Company appointed a committee to investigate, and this reported on the magnitude of the fraud committed against the company the following January. The accounts showed nearly £400,000 due from borrowers, but there were certificates only for £150,000, out of which £44,000 had unsigned certificates. However, less than £40,000 worth of goods were lodged in the warehouses as pledges.

== In Parliament ==
The shareholders then petitioned Parliament in February 1733, and the House of Commons enquired at length into the matter. In March, an act was passed to "encourage and compel George Robinson and John Thomson (sic) to appear ... and disclose the effects" of the Charitable Corporation. A royal proclamation was made on 17 March for apprehending Burroughs and Squire with a reward of £500 from the Treasury. The assignees in bankruptcy advertised a reward for those who would disclose his effects, reminding them of the penalty in that act for not doing so.

Charitable Corporation Frauds Act 1731
- Act of Parliament
- Parliament of Great Britain
- Long title: An Act to encourage and compel George Robinson Esquire and John Thomson to appear, and produce the Books, and discover the Effects, of the Charitable Corporation for Relief of industrious Poor, by assisting them with small Sums upon Pledges, at legal Interest; and to be examined thereupon at the Times and Places therein mentioned.
- Citation: 5 Geo. 2. c. 3
- Territorial extent: Great Britain

Dates
- Royal assent: 20 March 1732
- Commencement: 13 January 1732 (Note: Start of session.)
- Repealed: 30 July 1948
Other legislation
Amended by	Charitable Corporation Act 1732
Repealed by	Statute Law Revision Act 1948
Relates to	Charitable Corporation (Claims and Disputes) Act 1731; Sir Robert Sutton, etc., Restrained from Going Abroad Act 1731

Status: Repealed

Text of statute as originally enacted

Charitable Corporation (Claims and Disputes) Act 1731
- Act of Parliament
- Parliament of Great Britain
- Long title: An Act for appointing Commissioners, for taking, stating, and determining, all the Claims and Demands of the Creditors of the Charitable Corporation for Relief of industrious Poor, by assisting them with small Sums upon Pledges, at legal Interest; and of all Persons claiming any Share or Interest in the Stock or Fund of the said Corporation; and for enabling the said Corporation to name One Person to be an Assignee under the respective Commissions of Bankruptcy awarded against George Robinson and John Thomson; and for enabling the Commissioners acting under the said Commissions of Bankruptcy to proceed, and inquire of the Estates, Goods, and Effects, of the said Bankrupts, and to apply the same; and to oblige John Thomson, Father of the said John Thomson the Bankrupt, to appear before the said Commissioners of Bankruptcy in England.
- Citation: 5 Geo. 2. c. 31
- Territorial extent: Great Britain

Dates
- Royal assent: 1 June 1732
- Commencement: 13 January 1732
- Repealed: 30 July 1948
Other legislation
Repealed by	Statute Law Revision Act 1948
Relates to	Charitable Corporation Frauds Act 1731; Sir Robert Sutton, etc., Restrained from Going Abroad Act 1731

Status: Repealed

Text of statute as originally enacted

Sir Robert Sutton, etc., Restrained from Going Abroad Act 1731
- Act of Parliament
- Parliament of Great Britain
- Long title: An Act to restrain Sir Robert Sutton Knight of the Bath, Sir Archibald Grant Baronet, Denis Bond, William Burroughs, Esquires, Richard Woolley, and Thomas Warren, from going out of this Kingdom, for the Space of One Year, and until the End of the then next Session of Parliament; and for discovering their Estates and Effects, and to prevent the transporting or alienating the same; and to oblige William Squire to surrender himself, at a Time and Place mentioned in the Act, and to give Security for his not going out of this Kingdom for the Space of One Year, and until the End of the then next Session of Parliament; and for discovering his Estate and Effects, and to prevent the transporting or alienating the same; and for committing the aforesaid William Burroughs to the Prison of The Fleet, until he shall have complied with the Directions of this Act.
- Citation: 5 Geo. 2. c. 32
- Territorial extent: Great Britain

Dates
- Royal assent: 1 June 1732
- Commencement: 13 January 1732
- Repealed: 30 July 1948
Other legislation
Repealed by	Statute Law Revision Act 1948
Relates to	Charitable Corporation Frauds Act 1731; Charitable Corporation (Claims and Disputes) Act 1731

Status: Repealed

Text of statute as originally enacted

Parliament quickly passed the Charitable Corporation Frauds Act 1731 (5 Geo. 2. c. 3) to compel Robinson and Thomson to appear, or be guilty of a felony. The Commons appointed a committee to investigate, and this produced a detailed report on the affair. At the end of the session, two further acts were passed. One, the Charitable Corporation (Claims and Disputes) Act 1731 (5 Geo. 2. c. 31) appointed commissioners to determine the rights of the shareholders and creditors; for the Charitable Corporation to appoint an assignee in bankruptcy in respect of Thomson and Robinson, and to compel John Thomson. the warehouse keeper's father to appear before the commissioners in England on pain of being declared a felon. The other, the Sir Robert Sutton, etc., Restrained from Going Abroad Act 1731 (5 Geo. 2. c. 32) required Sutton, Grant, Bond, Burroughs, Wooley and Warren to deliver particulars of their estates to the Barons of the Exchequer. William Squire was required to surrender himself and do the same, while Burroughs was committed to the Fleet Prison until he complied. All of them (except Squires) delivered inventories accordingly, and they were printed by order of the Commons committee. It is probable that Squire remained abroad, as no further reference to him occurs in the London Gazette.

Charitable Corporation Act 1732
- Act of Parliament
- Parliament of Great Britain
- Long title: An Act to allow a further Time to John Thomson to appear, and produce the Books, and discover the Effects, of the Charitable Corporation for Relief of industrious Poor, by assisting them with small Sums upon Pledges, at legal Interest; and to be examined thereupon at the Times and Places fixed in the Bill; and for allowing the said John Thomson a Proportion out of the Effects of the said Corporation which he shall discover; and for preventing fraudulent releasing or assigning any Debt due from George Robinson or the said John Thomson, or either of them.
- Citation: 6 Geo. 2. c. 2
- Territorial extent: Great Britain

Dates
- Royal assent: 22 February 1733
- Commencement: 16 January 1733
- Repealed: 30 July 1948
Other legislation
Amends	Charitable Corporation Frauds Act 1731
Repealed by	Statute Law Revision Act 1948
Relates to	Charitable Corporation (Claims and Disputes) Act 1731; Lotteries Act 1732

Status: Repealed

Text of statute as originally enacted

Lotteries Act 1732 (Note: The citation of this act by this short title was authorised by section 1 of, and the first schedule to, the Short Titles Act 1896. Due to the repeal of those provisions it is now authorised by section 19(2) of the Interpretation Act 1978.)
- Act of Parliament
- Parliament of Great Britain
- Long title: An Act for appointing Commissioners, to examine, state, and report, who of the Sufferers in the Charitable Corporation are Objects of Compassion, according to the Descriptions therein mentioned; and for giving Relief to such Sufferers; and for enforcing the Laws made against Foreign Lotteries; and for empowering the said Commissioners to hear and determine the Claims of such Creditors and Proprietors of the said Corporation as have not made their Claims within the Time limited by an Act made in the last Session of Parliament, for taking, stating, and determining, all the Claims and Demands of the Creditors of the said Corporation, and of all Persons claiming any Share or Interest in the Stock or Fund of the said Corporation.
- Citation: 6 Geo. 2. c. 35
- Territorial extent: Great Britain

Dates
- Royal assent: 13 June 1733
- Commencement: 16 January 1733
- Repealed: England and Wales and Scotland: 1 January 1935; Northern Ireland: 1 August 1957 (Note: The Betting and Lotteries Act (Northern Ireland) 1957)
Other legislation
Amended by	Statute Law Revision Act 1867; Statute Law Revision Act 1887; Public Authorities Protection Act 1893
Repealed by	England and Wales and Scotland: Betting and Lotteries Act 1934; Northern Ireland: Betting and Lotteries Act (Northern Ireland) 1957
Relates to	Charitable Corporation Act 1732; Charitable Corporation (Arrangements with Creditors) Act 1732

Status: Repealed

Text of statute as originally enacted

Charitable Corporation (Arrangements with Creditors) Act 1732
- Act of Parliament
- Parliament of Great Britain
- Long title: An Act for making effectual such Agreement as shall be made between the Charitable Corporation for Relief of industrious Poor, by assisting them with small Sums upon Pledges, at legal Interest, and their Creditors.
- Citation: 6 Geo. 2. c. 36
- Territorial extent: Great Britain

Dates
- Royal assent: 13 June 1733
- Commencement: 16 January 1733
- Repealed: 30 July 1948
Other legislation
Repealed by	Statute Law Revision Act 1948
Relates to	Charitable Corporation Act 1732; Lotteries Act 1732; Charitable Corporation Lottery Act 1733; Charitable Corporation Lottery Act 1734

Status: Repealed

Text of statute as originally enacted

Charitable Corporation Lottery Act 1733
- Act of Parliament
- Parliament of Great Britain
- Long title: An Act for the Application and Disposal of the Residue of the Money raised, by Way of Lottery, on the Credit of an Act made in the last Session of Parliament, for the Relief of such Sufferers in the Charitable Corporation as are Objects of Compassion, according to the Descriptions therein mentioned.
- Citation: 7 Geo. 2. c. 11
- Territorial extent: Great Britain

Dates
- Royal assent: 15 May 1735
- Commencement: 1 May 1734 (Note: Section 1.)
- Repealed: 15 July 1867
Other legislation
Amended by	Charitable Corporation Lottery Act 1734
Repealed by	Statute Law Revision Act 1867
Relates to	Lotteries Act 1732

Status: Repealed

Text of statute as originally enacted

Charitable Corporation Lottery Act 1734
- Act of Parliament
- Parliament of Great Britain
- Long title: An Act for prolonging the Time for claiming the fortunate Tickets in the Charitable Corporation Lottery; and for making Provision for Tickets in the said Lottery lost, burnt, or otherwise destroyed.
- Citation: 8 Geo. 2. c. 14
- Territorial extent: Great Britain

Dates
- Royal assent: 15 May 1735
- Commencement: 14 January 1735
- Repealed: 15 July 1867
Other legislation
Amends	Charitable Corporation Lottery Act 1733
Repealed by	Statute Law Revision Act 1867
Relates to	Lotteries Act 1732

Status: Repealed

Text of statute as originally enacted

Neither Robinson nor Thomson complied. However, during the next session, Thomson offered to return under certain conditions, and the Charitable Corporation Act 1732 (6 Geo. 2. c. 2) was passed extending time and requiring him to appear before Parliament (or a committee of it) by 30 March 1732 and before his bankruptcy commissioners by 4 April. If he complied, he would be rewarded with a fifth of the assets overseas, which he delivered up, and one tenth of those in Great Britain. Thomson complied and appeared before a Commons committee, which produced a further report. Two further acts were passed at the end of the session. One, the Charitable Corporation (Arrangements with Creditors) Act 1732 (6 Geo. 2. c. 36) was to confirm an agreement between the Charitable Corporation and three-quarters of its creditors and make it binding on those under disabilities. The other, the Lotteries Act 1732 (6 Geo. 2. c. 35) authorised a lottery for the relief of those who suffered from the frauds, specifically excluding Robinson, Thomson, Wolley and Warren from benefitting. It also extended the time for submitting claims to the commissioners. A further act, the Charitable Corporation Lottery Act 1734 (8 Geo. 2. c. 14) was passed in 1735, extending the time for claiming prizes, amending the Charitable Corporation Lottery Act 1733 (7 Geo. 2. c. 11).

== Aftermath ==
The result of the frauds was to deprive the Charitable Corporation of the bulk of its assets. Bankruptcy proceedings against George Robinson and John Thomson continued for a long time, evidently due to litigation. They ended with a dividend being paid from Robinson's estate in 1748, and from Thomson's in 1747. Proceedings were taken against Sir Robert Sutton, leading to judgment being given in 1742 against him, that he was liable to make the company's losses though the five partners were primarily liable (see The Charitable Corporation v Sutton). Following the decree, the company sought to obtain an act to assist with the enquiries directed by the Court of Chancery on 18 August 1742, but this was rejected. In 1743, Sutton and the company entered into a deed of mutual release.

The subsequent history of the company remains unclear.

== See also ==
- The Charitable Corporation v Sutton (1742) 26 ER 642, the case where the directors were held liable for taking the corporation's money
- History of pawnbroking (1500 to 1800)
