= George Robinson (swindler) =

George Robinson was an English stockbroker and swindler in the 1720s and early 1730s. A banker in Lombard Street, he was appointed the circulating cashier of the Charitable Corporation. In 1727 he was one of the Corporation's 'Partnership of Five' (with Sir Alexander Grant, William Burroughs, William Squire and John Thomson) who began buying up shares. He and several officers of the Corporation obtained money from it by pawning false pledges, and proceeded to engage in a large scale speculation in the shares of that company and York Buildings Company, also borrowing against the shares purchased so that his partners failed to get what they bought.

Robinson obtained a seat in the House of Commons when he was elected MP for Great Marlow in 1731, but was unable to sit before the affair began to come to light. He fled to France with Thomson, the warehouse-keeper, in October. They were both declared bankrupt. Robinson was back by 25 November and appeared before the General Court of the Company. By 18 December, he was in hiding again because the Company would not supersede the Commission of bankruptcy against him. He had "seen fit to absent himself from the kingdom", according to William Goostry, his attorney. Robinson was expelled from the House in absentia on 3 April 1732 for "indirect and fraudulent Practices in the Affairs of the Charitable Corporation, and for having never attended the Service of the House, although required to do so".

His estate at Moor Place, Great Marlow (with a farmhouse, 300 acres (1.2 km^{2}) of land and 230 acres (0.93 km^{2}) of woods) was advertised for sale in January 1734. An earlier advertisement had also mentioned Temple Mills and a lock at Great Marlow. However, the bankruptcy proceedings continued for over 15 more years, a dividend being declared from his estate in 1748. As an Act of Parliament had been passed making him a felon if he did not return by a certain date, it is likely that he remained abroad for the rest of his life. Thomson returned after the Act was amended to extend the time for him doing so.

Parliament of Great Britain
Preceded by Edmund Waller; John Clavering	Member of Parliament for Great Marlow; 1731–1732; With: Edmund Waller	Succeeded by Edmund Waller; Sir Thomas Hoby, Bt
