= George Anson, 1st Baron Anson =

Royal Navy officer and politician (1697–1762)

Admiral of the Fleet The Right Honourable The Lord Anson PC FRS
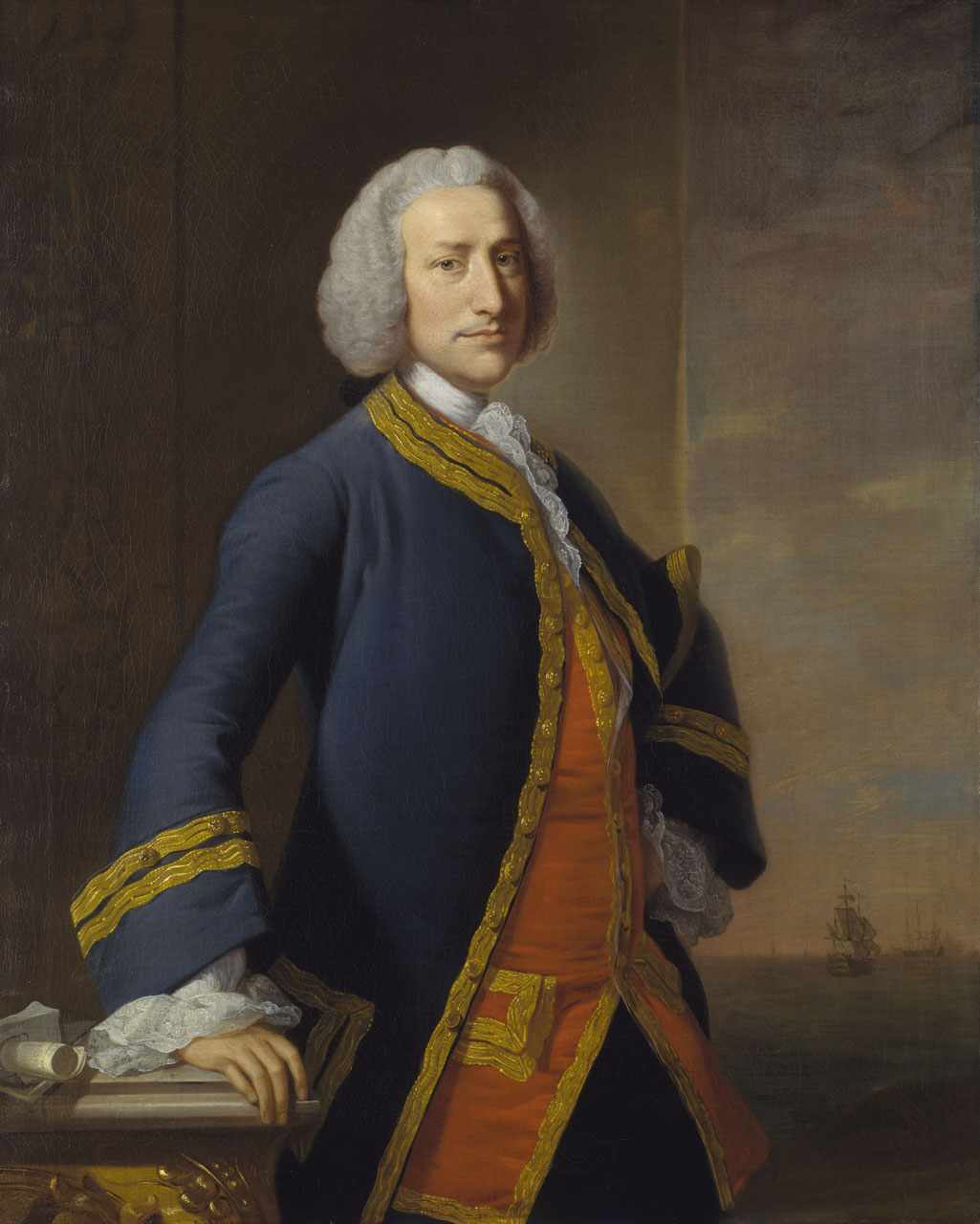
- Portrait by Thomas Hudson, c. 1740–1747

First Lord of the Admiralty
- In office 1757–1762
- Prime Minister: The Duke of Newcastle; The Earl of Bute
- Preceded by: The Earl of Winchilsea and Nottingham
- Succeeded by: The Earl of Halifax
- In office 1751–1756
- Prime Minister: Henry Pelham; The Duke of Newcastle
- Preceded by: The Earl of Sandwich
- Succeeded by: The Earl Temple

Personal details
- Born: 23 April 1697 Staffordshire, England
- Died: 6 June 1762 (aged 65) Moor Park, Hertfordshire
- Spouse: Elizabeth Yorke

Military service
- Allegiance: Great Britain
- Branch/service: Royal Navy
- Years of service: 1711–1762
- Rank: Admiral of the Fleet
- Commands: HMS Weazel; HMS Scarborough; HMS Garland; HMS Diamond; HMS Squirrel; HMS Centurion
- Battles/wars: War of the Spanish Succession; War of the Quadruple Alliance; War of Jenkins' Ear; War of the Austrian Succession; Seven Years' War

Admiral of the Fleet George Anson, 1st Baron Anson, PC, FRS (23 April 1697 – 6 June 1762) was a Royal Navy officer and politician from the Anson family.

He served as a junior officer during the War of the Spanish Succession and then saw active service against Spain at the Battle of Cape Passaro, off the south tip of Sicily, during the War of the Quadruple Alliance. He then undertook a circumnavigation of the globe during the War of Jenkins' Ear. Anson commanded the fleet that defeated the French Admiral de la Jonquière at the First Battle of Cape Finisterre in 1747, during the War of the Austrian Succession.

Anson went on to be First Lord of the Admiralty during the Seven Years' War. Among his reforms were the removal of corrupt defence contractors, improved medical care, submitting a revision of the Articles of War to Parliament to tighten discipline throughout the Navy, the transfer of British marines from Army to Navy authority, and a system for rating ships according to their number of guns.

== Background ==
=== Family ===
Anson was the son of William Anson of Shugborough in Staffordshire and Isabella Carrier, whose brother-in-law was the Earl of Macclesfield and Lord Chancellor, a relationship that proved very useful to the future admiral. He was born on 23 April 1697, (Note: The 9th edition of the Encyclopædia Britannica gives the 22nd.) at Shugborough Manor. He was one of eight surviving children of the couple, and the younger brother of the politician Thomas Anson.

=== Early career ===
In February 1712, amid the War of the Spanish Succession, Anson entered the navy at the age of 15. He served as a volunteer aboard the fourth-rate HMS Ruby, before transferring to the third-rate HMS Monmouth.

Promoted to lieutenant on 17 March 1716, he was assigned to the fourth-rate HMS Hampshire in service as part of a Baltic Sea fleet commanded by Admiral John Norris. Anson transferred to the aging fourth-rate HMS Montagu in March 1718, and saw active service against Spain at the Battle of Cape Passaro in August 1718 during the War of the Quadruple Alliance. He then transferred to the second-rate HMS Barfleur, flagship of Admiral George Byng, in October 1719.

Anson was promoted to commander in June 1722 and given command of the small 8-gun HMS Weazel. Anson's orders were to suppress smuggling between Britain and Holland, a task he swiftly and effectively performed. In recognition of his efforts he was promoted to the rank of post-captain in February 1723 and given command of the 32-gun sixth-rate HMS Scarborough with orders to escort British merchant convoys from the Carolinas (the Ansonborough district of Charleston, South Carolina, still commemorates his time there).

He transferred to the command of the sixth-rate HMS Garland, still on the Carolinas station, in July 1728, then to the command of the fifth-rate HMS Diamond in the Channel Fleet in 1730, and to the command of the sixth-rate HMS Squirrel back on the Carolinas station in 1731. He was given command of the 60-gun third-rate HMS Centurion in the West Africa Squadron in 1737 and, having been promoted to commodore with his broad pennant in HMS Centurion, he took command of a squadron sent to attack Spanish possessions in South America at the outset of the War of Jenkins' Ear.

== Voyage around the world ==
Centurion capturing Nuestra Señora de Covadonga on 20 June 1743

After setting off later than planned, Anson's squadron encountered successive disasters. The lateness of the season forced him to round the Horn in very stormy weather, and the navigating instruments of the time did not allow for exact observations. Two of his vessels, the fifth-rate HMS Pearl and the fourth-rate HMS Severn, failed to round Cape Horn and returned home. Meanwhile, the sixth-rate HMS Wager was wrecked off the coast of Chile, where the crew subsequently mutinied.

By the time Anson reached the Juan Fernández Islands in June 1741, only three of his six ships remained (HMS Centurion, the fourth-rate HMS Gloucester, and the sloop HMS Tryall), while the strength of his crews had fallen from 961 to 335. In the absence of any effective Spanish force on the coast, he was able to harass the enemy and to sack the small port city of Paita in Peru in November 1741. The steady decrease of his crews by scurvy and the worn-out state of his remaining consorts compelled him to collect all the remaining survivors in Centurion. He rested at the island of Tinian, and then made his way to Macau in November 1742.

After considerable difficulties with the Chinese, he sailed again with his one remaining vessel to cruise in search of one of the Manila galleons that conducted the trade between Mexico and the Chinese merchants in the Philippines, where he captured the Nuestra Señora de Covadonga with 1,313,843 pieces of eight on board, which he had encountered off Cape Espiritu Santo on 20 June 1743. The charts captured with the ship added many islands (and phantom islands) to the British knowledge of the Pacific, including the so-called Anson Archipelago.

Anson took his prize back to Macau, sold her cargo to the Chinese, kept the specie, and sailed for England via the Cape of Good Hope. Passing by means of a thick fog a French fleet then patrolling the Channel, he reached England on 15 June 1744. The prize money earned from the capture of the galleon made Anson a rich man for life and bought him considerable political influence. He initially refused promotion to Rear-Admiral of the Blue however, out of anger that the Admiralty refused to sanction a captain's commission he had given one of his officers.

== Naval command ==
=== Senior officer ===
"Sir, you have vanquished the Invincible and glory follows with you."

— Admiral
de la Jonquière

Anson was elected Member of Parliament for Hedon in the East Riding of Yorkshire in 1744. He joined the Board of Admiralty led by the Duke of Bedford in December 1744. Promoted to Rear-Admiral of the White on 23 April 1745 and to vice-admiral of the blue in July 1745, he took command of the Western Squadron, with his flag in the third-rate HMS Yarmouth, in July 1746.

Anson commanded the fleet that defeated the Marquis de la Jonquière at the First Battle of Cape Finisterre in May 1747 during the War of the Austrian Succession. His force captured the entire French squadron: four ships of the line, two frigates, and six merchantmen The treasure amounted to £300,000. He was elevated to the peerage as Baron Anson, of Soberton, in the County of Southampton, on 11 June 1747. In 1748, the memoir of Anson's circumnavigation—Voyage Round the World in the Years MDCCXL, I, II, III, IV—was published, having been edited from his notes and Richard Walter's journals by Benjamin Robins. It was a vast popular and commercial success. He was promoted to admiral of the blue on 12 May 1748 and became Vice-Admiral of Great Britain on 4 July 1749. He was advanced to Senior Naval Lord on the Admiralty Board in November 1749.

=== First Lord of the Admiralty ===
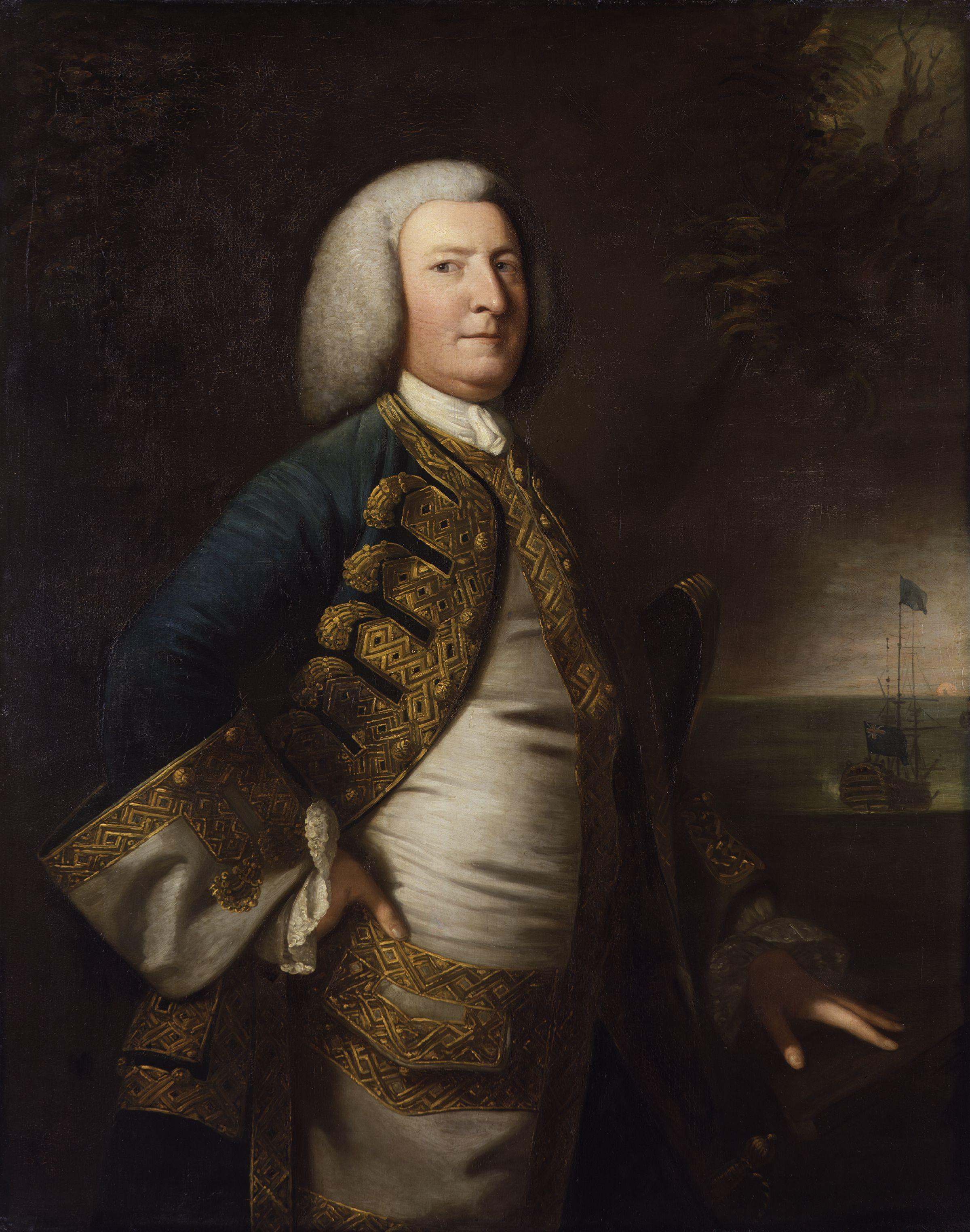
1755 portrait of Anson by Joshua Reynolds

Anson became First Lord of the Admiralty in the Broad Bottom Ministry in June 1751 and continued to serve during the first Newcastle ministry. Among his reforms was the removal of corrupt defence contractors, improved medical care, submitting a revision of the Articles of War to Parliament so tightening discipline throughout the Navy, the transfer of British marines from Army to Navy authority and a system for rating ships according to their number of guns.

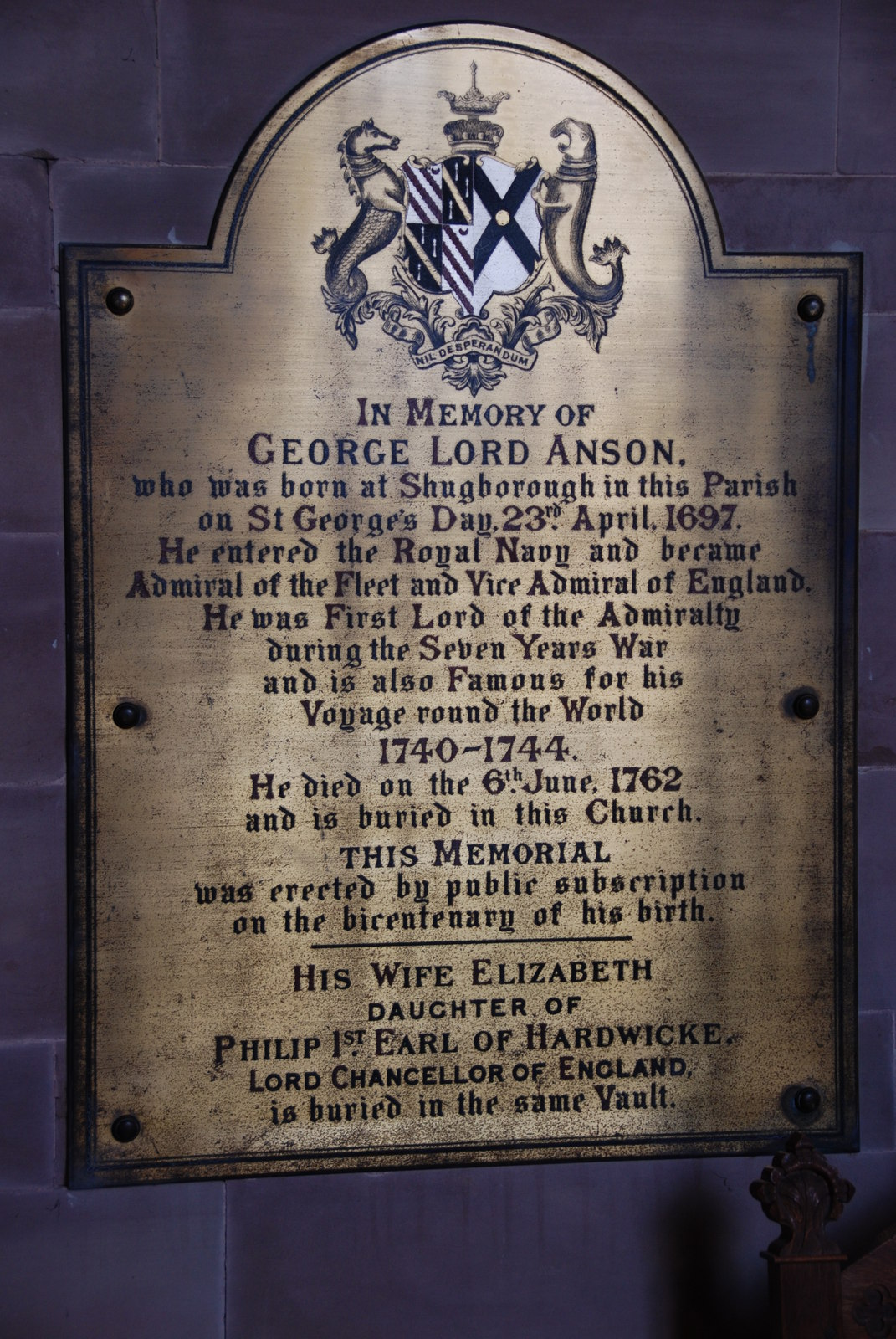
Plaque to Anson in Colwich, Staffordshire

Anson oversaw the Navy for much of the Seven Years' War, and established a permanent squadron at Devonport which could patrol the western approaches to both Britain and France. He was particularly concerned at the prospect of a French invasion of the British Isles which led him to keep a large force in the English Channel. In 1756 he was criticised for not sending enough ships with Admiral Byng to relieve Minorca because he wanted to protect Britain from a threatened invasion, only to see Byng fail to save Minorca while no invasion attempt materialised. He left the Admiralty when the Newcastle ministry fell in November 1756 and then served again as First Lord when the Pitt–Newcastle ministry was created in June 1757.

In July 1758, after Edward Hawke had decided to strike his flag and return to port over a misunderstanding at which he took offence, Anson hoisted his own flag in the first-rate HMS Royal George and took over command of the Western Squadron again. Anson oversaw Britain's naval response to a more serious French invasion attempt in 1759. He instituted a close blockade of the French coast, which proved crippling to the French economy and ensured no invasion fleet could slip out undetected. The British victories at the Battle of Lagos in August 1759 and the Battle of Quiberon Bay in November 1759 ended any realistic chance of a major invasion of the British Isles.

As well as securing home defence, Anson co-ordinated with William Pitt a series of British attacks on French colonies around the globe. By 1760 the British had captured Canada, Senegal and Guadeloupe from the French, and followed it up by capturing Belle Île and Dominica in 1761. In 1762 the entry of Spain into the war offered further chances for British expeditions. Anson was the architect of a plan to seize Manila in the Philippines and, using the idea and plans of Admiral Sir Charles Knowles to capture Havana. Anson had been concerned that the combined strength of the French and Spanish navies would overpower Britain, but he still threw himself into the task of directing these expeditions. The British also captured Martinique and Grenada in the French West Indies. Anson was promoted to Admiral of the Fleet on 30 July 1761. His last service was to convey Queen Charlotte to England.

Despite his prominence, naval historian Nicholas A. M. Rodger has described Anson as "by nature austere and withdrawn, disinclined to correspondence or even to conversation ... notoriously difficult to speak to." While happy to support promotions for junior officers when recommended by fellow admirals, he was notoriously opposed to promotions supported by civilian political figures. In Parliament he aligned himself with a faction of other naval officers which routinely supported the ministry of the day.

He died at Moor Park in Hertfordshire on 6 June 1762 and was buried at St Michael and All Angels’ Church in Colwich, Staffordshire. Places named after him include Anson County, North Carolina and Anson, Maine. Eight warships of the Royal Navy have also been named after him.

== Family ==
In April 1748, Anson married Lady Elizabeth Yorke, daughter of Philip Yorke, 1st Earl of Hardwicke; they had no children.

== Sources ==
- Baynes, T. S., ed. (1878), "George Lord Anson" , Encyclopædia Britannica, vol. 2 (9th ed.), New York: Charles Scribner's Sons, p. 93
- Anderson, Fred (2001). Crucible of War: The Seven Years' War and the Fate of Empire in British North America, 1754–1766. Faber and Faber. ISBN 978-0571205356.
- Anson, Walter Vernon (1912). The Life of Admiral Lord Anson, the father of the British Navy 1697–1762. London, John Murray.
- Cokayne, G. E. (2000). The Complete Peerage of England, Scotland, Ireland, Great Britain and the United Kingdom, Extant, Extinct or Dormant, new ed., 13 volumes in 14, 1910–1959; reprint in 6 volumes. Vol. I. Gloucester, U.K.: Alan Sutton Publishing. ISBN 978-1145312296.
- Corbett, Julian Stafford (1907). England in the Seven Years War: A study in combined operations, Volume II. London.
- Heathcote, Tony (2002). The British Admirals of the Fleet 1734–1995. Pen & Sword. ISBN 0-85052-835-6.
- Lambert, Andrew (2009). Admirals: The Naval Commanders Who Made Britain Great. Faber and Faber. ISBN 978-0571231577.
- Rodger, N.A.M. (1979). The Admiralty. Offices of State. Lavenham: T. Dalton Ltd. ISBN 0900963948.

Attribution

Parliament of Great Britain
Preceded by Earl of Mountrath; George Berkeley	Member of Parliament for Hedon; 1744–1747; With: George Berkeley 1742–1746; Samuel Gumley 1746 – Feb 1747; Luke Robinson from Feb 1747	Succeeded by Sir John Savile; Luke Robinson
Political offices
Preceded by The Earl of Sandwich	First Lord of the Admiralty; 1751–1756	Succeeded by The Earl Temple
Preceded by The Earl of Winchilsea and Nottingham	First Lord of the Admiralty; 1757–1762	Succeeded by The Earl of Halifax
Military offices
Preceded by Lord Vere Beauclerk	Senior Naval Lord; 1749–1751	Succeeded by Sir William Rowley
Preceded by Sir George Clinton	Admiral of the Fleet; 1761–1762	Succeeded by Sir William Rowley
Honorary titles
Preceded by Sir John Norris	Vice-Admiral of Great Britain; 1749–1762	Succeeded by Henry Osborn
Peerage of Great Britain
New creation	Baron Anson; 1747–1762	Extinct
