= York Buildings Company =

- Industry: Water supply, estates, life assurance
- Founded: 1675 in London, UK
- Defunct: 1829
- Fate: Liquidated

The York Buildings Company was an English company in the late 17th and early 18th centuries.

== Waterworks ==
The full name of the company was The Governor and Company for Raising the Thames Water at York Buildings. The undertaking was established in 1675 and incorporated in 1690 with a capital of £4,800 (equivalent to £96,000 in 2025), but obtained a private act in 1691 to increase its capital and enable it to buy lands. As might be expected this provided the company with a steady, but unspectacular income from the rents paid by the householders supplied with water. Water supply was its sole business until 1719.

The company was technologically advanced for its time. It tried the steam pump of Thomas Savery, a precursor of the steam engine, though this proved a failure. In 1726, a Newcomen engine was installed at York Buildings but when the company fell into financial difficulties in 1732 the engine was broken up, cylinders being sold to the London Lead Company and Sir James Lowther. However the company continued to operate its waterworks for many years, becoming the final asset of the company, just as it was the first. However the business had been injured as far back as 1731, by the establishment of a rival Chelsea Waterworks Company. The works were leased out in 1746, and the lease was renewed periodically until 1818.

== Forfeited estates ==
By 1719, procuring the incorporation of a company had become difficult, with the result that it was cheaper for speculators to buy up the patent of an existing company than to obtain a new one. In that year, its new proprietors resolved to raise a joint stock of £1,200,000 to buy forfeited and other estates in Great Britain. The new capital was immediately taken up and a 10% call was paid. This fund and borrowings then enabled the company to buy estates costing over £300,000, with a rental of £15,000. The estates purchased were estates, mainly in Scotland, forfeited after the Jacobite rising of 1715, when the rebels were stripped of their lands.

In January 1720, it proposed to undertake life assurance, though the Attorney-General advised them that this was ultra vires. The company's stock rose in price during the year, reaching its peak in mid August, but the threat of a writ of scire facias depressed the price, which collapsed to the point where the shares became almost unsaleable. In September, the company agreed to 'proceed only according to ancient known and regular methods, agreeable to their constitution and of the encouragement given them by Parliament'. They promised to make a call on their proprietors and did so, but gave each proprietor the option of surrendering half their stock to the company. Most proprietors took this option, with the result that the capital was little increased. The directors were left with £675,000 of stock (10% paid) which they had difficulty in selling. The result was that the company was crippled, and had difficulty in meeting its obligations. In 1721, it raised money by conducting lotteries, the prizes including stock in the company and annuities secured on its estates.

The company undertook various ventures to exploit its estates, including mining copper and lead ores in the Panmure estates in Forfarshire, starting an ironworks at Abernethy and shipping timber from there. However these works were not profitable. It also obtained illegal advances from the Charitable Corporation. Various financial stratagems were undertaken to enable it to stay in business.

Eventually, in 1732 its annuitants petitioned Parliament. A new court of directors was elected and supported this. A call was made on shareholders, who were given the £95,000 stock remaining in the hands of the company. This was followed further stock manipulation. On 3 April 1732 George Robinson, the Member of Parliament for Great Marlow, was expelled from Parliament for diverting £356,000 of funds of the Charitable Corporation into buying York Buildings Company stock; the profits of the sale were given to him.

== Liquidation ==
York Buildings Waterworks Corporation (Scottish Estates) Act 1763
- Act of Parliament
- Parliament of Great Britain
- Long title: An Act for carrying into Execution an Agreement entered into, between the Governor and Company of Undertakers for raising the Thames Water in York Buildings, the Trustees for Annuitants on Lives, William Lock Esquire, his Grace Edward Duke of Norfolk and Partners, Sir Andrew Chadwick Knight, and the Reverend Samuel-Grove Clerk, all Real Creditors of the said Governor and Company; and for authorizing and directing the Court of Session in Scotland to proceed to a Sale of such Parts of the Estates of Marischal, Panmure, Southesk, and others, pursuant to the said Agreement, as were leased to Sir Archibald Grant Baronet and Alexander Garden Esquire.
- Citation: 3 Geo. 3. c. 43 Pr.
- Territorial extent: Great Britain

Dates
- Royal assent: 19 April 1763
- Commencement: (Note: Start of session.)
Other legislation
Relates to	York Buildings Waterworks Act 1690; York Buildings Company (Sale of Scottish Estates) Act 1776; York Buildings Company (Dissolution) Act 1829

Status: Current legislation

York Buildings Company (Sale of Scottish Estates) Act 1776
- Act of Parliament
- Parliament of Great Britain
- Long title: An Act for expediting the Sale of the Estates in Scotland, belonging to the York Buildings Company, for the Relief of their Creditors.
- Citation: 17 Geo. 3. c. 24
- Territorial extent: Great Britain

Dates
- Royal assent: 30 April 1777
- Commencement: 31 October 1776
- Repealed: 31 July 1978
Other legislation
Repealed by	Statute Law (Repeals) Act 1978
Relates to	York Buildings Waterworks Act 1690; York Buildings Waterworks Corporation (Scottish Estates) Act 1763; York Buildings Company (Dissolution) Act 1829

Status: Repealed

Text of statute as originally enacted

York Buildings Company (Dissolution) Act 1829
- Act of Parliament
- Parliament of the United Kingdom
- Long title: An Act for dissolving the Corporation of The Governor and Company of Undertakers for raising Thames Water in York Buildings; and for vesting the Property of the Company in Trustees, to sell and divide the Proceeds amongst the Stockholders of the Company.
- Citation: 10 Geo. 4. c. 28 Pr.
- Territorial extent: United Kingdom

Dates
- Royal assent: 19 June 1829
- Commencement: 19 June 1829 (Note: The Acts of Parliament (Commencement) Act 1793.)

Status: Current legislation

In 1740, the affairs of the court became subject to court proceedings, partly in the Court of Chancery and partly in Scotland. In 1756, an agreement was made as to the respective priorities of various classes of creditor for payment. This was followed by an act of Parliament in 1764, the York Buildings Waterworks Corporation (Scottish Estates) Act 1763 (3 Geo. 3. c. 43 Pr.) for the sale of the company's estates, enabling some of the debts to be paid. The sale of further estates was authorised in 1777 by York Buildings Company (Sale of Scottish Estates) Act 1776 (17 Geo. 3. c. 24), the sale taking place in 1783. An agreement with creditors was made in 1786, but only led to more litigation until a further agreement was made in 1792, though this was not approved by the court until 1802. This left the company with £10,000, some government stock and its waterworks.

The waterworks had been in lease for over 50 years. It was sold in 1818 to the New River Company in exchange for an annuity of £250. The company was finally dissolved by another act of Parliament, the York Buildings Company (Dissolution) Act 1829 (10 Geo. 4. c. 28 Pr.).

== The estates ==
Among the forfeited estates handed over to the York Buildings Company were:

- Edzell Castle
- Belhelvie Kirk, part of the estate of James Maule, 4th Earl of Panmure
- Callendar House, Falkirk
- Widdrington Castle estate of William Widdrington, 4th Baron Widdrington in Northumberland.

== See also ==
- John Theophilus Desaguliers. Desaguliers advised the company on steam technology. He was chaplain to James Brydges, 1st Duke of Chandos, one of the investors.
