= Sir Lionel Darell, 5th Baronet =

English landowner and baronet

Captain Sir Lionel Darell, Bt JP DL

High Sheriff of Gloucestershire
- In office 1887–1887
- Preceded by: Alfred Sartoris
- Succeeded by: Sir William Marling, 2nd Baronet

Personal details
- Born: Lionel Edward Darell; 6 September 1845
- Died: 17 February 1919 (aged 73)
- Spouse: Helen Frances Marshland (m. 1870; died 1919)
- Children: 8, including Lionel, William
- Parent(s): Sir William Darell, 4th Baronet; Harriet Mary Tierney
- Education: Christ Church, Oxford

Captain Sir Lionel Edward Darell, 5th Baronet JP DL (6 September 1845 – 17 February 1919) was an English landowner and soldier.

== Early life ==
Darell was born on 6 September 1845. He was the eldest son of the Rev. Sir William Darell, 4th Baronet, Rector at Fretherne, and Harriet Mary Tierney. Among his siblings were Flora Mary Darell (who married Edward Stopford Claremont, a son of Edward Stopford Claremont). Before his parents were married in 1843, his father had been married to Mary Ford (a daughter of Sir Francis Ford, 2nd Baronet) in 1840. Mary died in 1842. After his mother's death in 1873, his father married Fanny Julia Braithwaite (a daughter of Alfred Braithwaite) in 1880.

The Darell family derived its fortune from service in the East India Company in the late eighteenth century. His paternal grandparents were Sir Harry Darell, 2nd Baronet and Amelia Mary Anne Beecher. His maternal grandfather was Sir Edward Tierney, 2nd Baronet. Through his brother Edward Tierney Gilchrist Darell, he was uncle to Florence Mary (née Darell), Countess of Kinnoull (second wife of Archibald Hay, 13th Earl of Kinnoull).

He matriculated at Christ Church, Oxford in 1864.

== Career ==
Upon the death of his father on 1 June 1883, he succeeded as the 5th Baronet Darell, of Ancaster House, Richmond Hill (historically in Surrey). His father had moved the family from Richmond Hill to Fretherne Court, which say on 676 acres situated in the Severn Vale between the Gloucester and Sharpness Canal and the River Severn, in Fretherne, Gloucestershire.

Sir Lionel, a longtime member of the Gloucestershire County Council and Captain in the Gloucestershire Yeomanry Cavalry, served as a Justice of the Peace and Deputy Lieutenant of Gloucestershire. He served as High Sheriff of Gloucestershire in 1887.

== Personal life ==
On 26 June 1870, Darell was married to Helen Frances Marshland, the only child of Edward Marshland of Henbury Park, Cheshire. Together, they were the parents of:

- Violet Mary Darell (1871–1938), who died unmarried.
- Evelyn May Darell (1873–1949), who died unmarried.
- Marguerite Helen Darell (1875–1944), who married Brig.-Gen. Montgomery Lancelot Carleton, son of Gen. Henry Alexander Carleton, in 1908.
- Sir Lionel Edward Hamilton Marmaduke Darell, 6th Baronet (1876–1954), who married Eleanor Marion Edwards-Heathcote, a daughter of Capt. Justinian Edwards-Heathcote, MP for North West Staffordshire, in 1903.
- William Harry Verelst Darell (1878–1954), a Brigadier-General who married Eva Jeffie Bainbridge, a daughter of Emerson Muschamp Bainbridge, MP for Gainsborough, in 1907.
- Dorothy Muriel Darell (1882–1961), who married Capt. John Sturges Burrow Hill, eldest son of Edward Burrow Hill, in 1910. They divorced in 1930.
- Guy Marsland Darell (1883–1947), a Lt.-Col. with the Coldstream Guards who married Esmé Violet Stewart-Savile, daughter of Capt. Walter Stewart-Savile, in 1914.
- Barbara Gladys Darell (d. 1913), who died unmarried.

Sir Lionel died on 17 February 1919 and was succeeded in the baronetcy by his eldest son Lionel. As he left seven children and a widow who needed to be supported, Lionel had to sell the family seat, Fretherne Court, which had been in the family for nearly a hundred years by that time.

=== Descendants ===
Through his eldest son Lionel, he was a grandfather of Margaret Eleanor Phyllis Darell (wife of Baron Helmut William Bruno Schröder of Schroders and mother to British banker and billionaire Baron Bruno Schroder), and Nancy Brenda Darell (wife of Lt.-Gen. Sir George Gordon-Lennox, son of Maj. Lord Bernard Gordon-Lennox).

Through his second son William, he was a grandfather of Sir William Oswald Darell, 7th Baronet, and Elizabeth Joy Darell (wife of Peter Julian Clive, a son of Sir Robert Henry Clive and Hon. Magdalen Muir Mackenzie, a daughter of the 1st Baron Muir Mackenzie).

Through his youngest son Guy, he was a grandfather of Cynthia Mary Darell (wife of Michael Webster Harrap) and Brig. Sir Jeffrey Lionel Darell, 8th Baronet, who was part of "a small group of men responsible for the protection of the Royal family" during the beginning of World War II.

Baronetage of Great Britain
Preceded by William Lionel Darell	Baronet (of Richmond Hill); 1883–1919	Succeeded by Lionel Edward Hamilton Marmaduke Darell
