= Lionel Darell =

Lionel Darell may refer to:

- Sir Lionel Darell, 1st Baronet (1742–1803) of the Darell baronets
- Sir Lionel Darell, 5th Baronet (1845–1919) of the Darell baronets
- Sir Lionel Darell, 6th Baronet (1876–1954) of the Darell baronets

== See also ==
- Darell baronets
