= Fretherne Court =

Residential sporting mansion in the UK

- Location in Gloucestershire
- 51°46′53″N 02°23′07″W
- Location: Fretherne, Gloucestershire, England

Fretherne Court was a residential sporting mansion and deer park estate of some 676 acres, situated in the Severn Vale between the Gloucester and Sharpness Canal and the River Severn, in Fretherne, Gloucestershire. It was owned by the Darell family who were Baronets of Richmond Hill.

== History ==
Fretherne Court was built around 1864 by Sir Edward Tierney, 2nd Baronet who also enlarged Fretherne church from one aisle to three. A good description of Sir Edwards renovations can be read in Sir Lionel E. H. M. Darell's memoirs - written about 1950:

"My grandfather - Rev. Sir William Lionel Darell, 4th Baronet (1817–1883) - had come from Richmond Hill, London to a little village of Fretherne, the living being presented to him by Sir Edward Tierney. Sir Edward completely transmogrofied the humble little refectory of Fretherne, building on to it many extra reception rooms, a ballroom, billiard room, water towers and halls, and last but no means least, a charming little chapel just inside the front entrance hall. Our airey nurseries were on the second floor, but in those days there was no electric light, central heating, or bathroom of any description. The Kitchens were large, designed after the big kitchen at Christ Church, Oxford, but the food had to be brought up many passages".

=== Auction (1919) ===
Fretherne Court was sold off in 26 parcels or lots in an auction by Bruton Knowles at the Bell Hotel, Gloucester, on Saturday, 6 September 1919, when Sir Lionel Edward Darell, 5th Baronet (1845–1919) died, by his son Sir Lionel Edward Hamilton Marmaduke Darell, 6th Baronet (1876–1954), who called himself 'Ratcatcher Baronet' in his privately published biography.

From his biography Lionel describes why he had to sell Fretherne Court:

"... And so we return to my poor father who died in February 1919 beloved by all, and I succeeded him. It was soon very evident after reading his will and consultation with the family lawyer, that my old home would have to go - there was no question about it. The estate had to be split up amongst the seven surviving children, with of course provisions for my mother, so I at once settled to sell Fretherne Court Estate, which had been in my family for say some ninety years. or so, my grandfather having come there as a squarson (squire clergyman) from Richmond. It was very sad, but Fretherne Court had no modern requirements, no central heating, and they said we used to burn a ton of coal a day there - fancy the price now, and of course you could not have got it - no electricity, although my uncle had advocated this so many years before, the kitchens about a quarter of a mile, or so to speak, from the dining rooms water supply very indifferent, only one or two bathrooms, and the drainage system - well, I finish with this ..."

The mansion was described in the auction literature as of hansome elevation, facing south and east and commanding fine views over the Severn, approached by a carriage Drive, through well-timbered grounds with picturesque lodge entrance, delightful pleasure grounds of terrace formation. A fine walled kitchen garden with glass houses excellent stabling for 16 horses, garage for 5 cars.

The mansion was eventually demolished in the mid-1920s, and much of the high-quality materials was sold to local builders for renovations to local buildings.

== The Darell Arms ==
Sir William Lionel Darell built a pub in the village of Fretherne, naming it The Darell Arms after the family. Replacing the House Inn, which previously stood on the same sight, the pub was constructed in mock Tudor style with two ornate gabled ends. The Darell Arms closed c. 1990 and is now a private residence.

== See also ==
- The Darell baronets from Richmond Hill
