= Sir Lionel Darell, 6th Baronet =

English landowner and baronet

Colonel Sir Lionel Darell, Bt DSO JP DL

High Sheriff of Gloucestershire
- In office 1924–1924
- Preceded by: Sir Percival Scrope Marling
- Succeeded by: Sir Philip Stott, 1st Baronet

Personal details
- Born: Lionel Edward Hamilton Marmaduke Darell; 2 April 1876
- Died: 27 May 1954 (aged 78) Chelsea Square, London
- Spouse: Eleanor Marion Edwards-Heathcote (m. 1903; died 1953)
- Relations: Bernard Gordon Lennox (grandson); Bruno Schroder (grandson)
- Children: 3
- Parent(s): Sir Lionel Darell, 5th Baronet; Helen Frances Marshland
- Education: Eton College
- Alma mater: Christ Church, Oxford

Colonel Sir Lionel Edward Hamilton Marmaduke Darell, 6th Baronet DSO JP DL (2 April 1876 – 27 May 1954) was an English soldier and landowner.

== Early life ==
He was the eldest son of Sir Lionel Darell, 5th Baronet and Helen Frances Marshland. Among his siblings was Brigadier-General William Harry Verelst Darell of the Coldstream Guards.

The Darell family derived its fortune from service in the East India Company in the late eighteenth century. His paternal grandparents were the Rev. Sir William Darell, 4th Baronet and Harriet Mary Tierny (a daughter of Sir Edward Tierney, 2nd Baronet). His maternal grandfather was Edward Marshland of Henbury Park, Cheshire. His paternal aunt, Flora Mary Darell, was the wife of Edward Stopford Claremont (a son of Edward Stopford Claremont).

He was educated at Eton College and Christ Church, Oxford.

== Career ==
Darell served as aide-de-camp to General Officer Commanding of Cape Colony between 1909 and 1912, reaching the rank of Major in the 1st Life Guards. He fought in World War I between 1914 and 1917, serving in Egypt, Gallipoli, Sinai, and Palestine. He was mentioned in despatches twice and was awarded the Distinguished Service Order in 1917. In 1936, he was made Honorary Colonel in the 5th Battalion, Gloucestershire Regiment.

Upon the death of his father on 17 February 1919, he succeeded as the 6th Baronet Darell, of Ancaster House, Richmond Hill (historically in Surrey). Sir Lionel lived at Saul Lodge in Frampton on Severn, Stonehouse, Gloucestershire, and served as a Justice of the Peace and Deputy Lieutenant of Gloucestershire. He served as High Sheriff of Gloucestershire in 1924.

== Personal life ==
On 21 April 1903, Darell married Eleanor Marion Edwards-Heathcote (1876–1953), a daughter of British Army officer and Conservative politician, Capt. Justinian Edwards-Heathcote, MP for North West Staffordshire, and the former Eleanor Stone (sister to Frances Stone, wife of Gen. Sir John Alexander Ewart, both daughters and co-heiresses of Spencer Stone of Callingwood Hall). Together, they were the parents of:

- Margaret Eleanor Phyllis Darell (d. 1994), who married Baron Helmut William Bruno Schröder of Schroders, only surviving son of Baron Bruno Schröder, in 1930.
- Nancy Brenda Darell (d. 1993), who married Lt.-Gen. Sir George Gordon-Lennox, son of Maj. Lord Bernard Gordon-Lennox (son of the 7th Duke of Richmond) and Hon. Evelyn Loch (a daughter of the 1st Baron Loch), in 1931.
- Lionel Algernon Heathcote Darell (1905–1905), who died in infancy.

Lady Darell died on 6 July 1953. Sir Lionel died less than a year later on 27 May 1954 at the home of his daughter Margaret in Chelsea Square, London. As he was predeceased by his only son, he was succeeded in the baronetcy by his nephew, William Oswald Darell.

=== Descendants ===
Through his daughter Nancy, he was a grandfather of two, Maj.-Gen. Bernard Gordon Lennox, Commandant of the British Sector in Berlin, and Col. David Henry Charles Gordon Lennox of Saxham Hall, High Sheriff of Suffolk.

Through his daughter Margaret, he was a grandfather of British banker and billionaire Baron Bruno Schroder and Baroness Charmaine Brenda Schröder (who married merchant banker George von Mallinckrodt).

Baronetage of Great Britain
Preceded by Lionel Edward Darell	Baronet (of Richmond Hill); 1919–1953	Succeeded by William Oswald Darell
