= Darell baronets of Richmond Hill (1795) =

Escutcheon of the Darell baronets of Richmond Hill

The Darell baronetcy, of Richmond Hill in the County of Surrey, was created in the Baronetage of Great Britain on 12 May 1795 for Lionel Darell, a nabob and Member of Parliament for Hedon from 1784 to 1802.

The 5th Baronet was High Sheriff of Gloucestershire in 1887. The 6th Baronet was a colonel in the 1st Life Guards, a county councillor and Alderman for Gloucestershire and High Sheriff of the county in 1924.

The 8th Baronet was a brigadier in the Coldstream Guards and served as High Sheriff of Norfolk from 1985 to 1986. As of 2026 the title is held by his son, the 9th Baronet, who succeeded in 2013.

== Darell baronets, of Richmond Hill (1795) ==
- Sir Lionel Darell, 1st Baronet (1742–1803)
- Sir Harry Verelst Darell, 2nd Baronet (1768–1828)
- Sir Harry Francis Colville Darell, 3rd Baronet (1814–1853)
- Sir William Lionel Darell, 4th Baronet (1817–1883)
- Sir Lionel Edward Darell, 5th Baronet (1845–1919)
- Sir Lionel Edward Hamilton Marmaduke Darell, 6th Baronet (1876–1954).
- Sir William Oswald Darell, 7th Baronet (1910–1959)
- Sir Jeffrey Lionel Darell, 8th Baronet (1919–2013)
- Sir Guy Jeffrey Adair Darell, 9th Baronet (born 1961)

The heir apparent is the present holder's only son Harry Thomas Adair Darell (born 1995).

== Extended family ==
Brigadier-General William Harry Verelst Darell (1878–1954) was the second son of the 5th Baronet.

== Notes ==
Baronetage of Great Britain
Preceded by Gamon baronets	Darell baronets of Richmond Hill; 12 May 1795	Succeeded by Neave baronets
