= Sir William Darell, 4th Baronet =

English clergyman and baronet

The Reverend Sir William Darell, Bt JP
- Born: William Lionel Darell; 5 February 1817
- Died: 1 June 1884 (aged 67)
- Education: Christ Church, Oxford
- Spouse(s): Mary Ford (m. 1840; died 1842) Harriet Mary Tierney (m. 1843; died 1873) Fanny Julia Braithwaite (m. 1880; died 1883)
- Parent(s): Sir Harry Darell, 2nd Baronet; Amelia Mary Anne Beecher
- Relatives: Sir Lionel Darell, 1st Baronet (grandfather)

The Reverend Sir William Lionel Darell, 4th Baronet JP (5 February 1817 – 1 June 1883), was an English clergyman who served as rector of Fretherne.

== Early life ==
Darell was born on 5 February 1817. He was the second son of Sir Harry Darell, 2nd Baronet and Amelia Mary Anne Beecher. Among his siblings were Sir Harry Darell, 3rd Baronet, brevet Lieutenant-Colonel in the 7th Dragoon Guards, Emily Mary Darell (wife of the Rev. Anthony Berwick Lechmere, son of Sir Anthony Lechmere, 1st Baronet), Isabella Martha Darell (wife of Henry Shirley of Peppingford Lodge, Sussex), and Eliza Anne Darell (wife of Henry Brown of the Bombay Civil Service).

The Darell family derived its fortune from his father and grandfather's service in the East India Company in the late eighteenth century. His paternal grandparents were the former Isabella Tullie and Sir Lionel Darell, 1st Baronet, MP for Hedon. His maternal grandfather was William Beecher of Howbury, Bedfordshire.

He was educated at Christ Church, Oxford, receiving his B.A. in 1839 and M.A. in 1842.

== Career ==
The Rector at Fretherne in Gloucestershire from 1844, he succeeded as the 4th Baronet Darell, of Ancaster House, Richmond Hill (historically in Surrey) upon the death of his unmarried elder brother, Harry Francis Colville Darell on 6 January 1853.

Sir William served as a Magistrate for Gloucestershire and Cork.

== Personal life ==
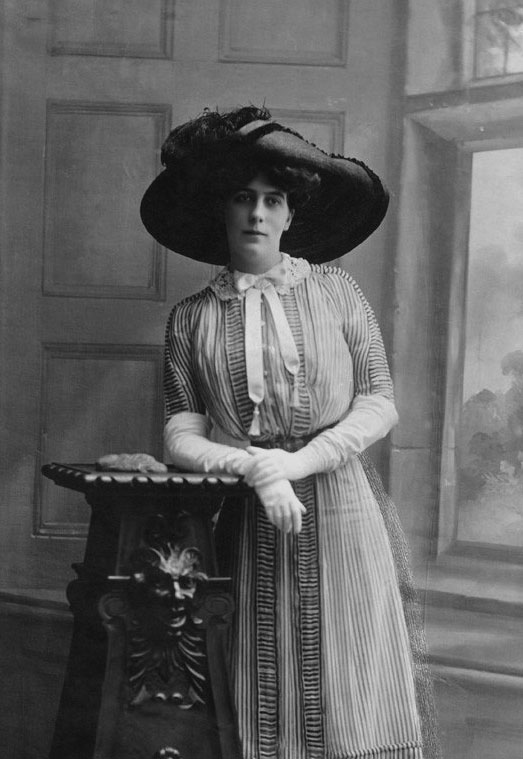
Photograph of his granddaughter, Florence Hay (née Darell), Countess of Kinnoull, 1910

On 28 January 1840, Darell was married to Mary Ford (d. 1842), eldest daughter of Sir Francis Ford, 2nd Baronet and Eliza Brady (a daughter of Henry Brady of County Limerick, Ireland). Mary died, without issue, in 1842.

His second marriage was on 18 April 1843 to Harriet Mary Tierney (d. 1873), daughter of Sir Edward Tierney, 2nd Baronet. Her father gave them Fretherne Court, which Sir Edward had completely transmogrified from a humble refectory into a lavish country seat with many reception rooms, a ballroom, billiard room, water towers and halls, and a chapel just inside the front entrance hall. Before her death in 1873, they were the parents of:

- Flora Mary Darell (c. 1844–1907), who married Edward Stopford Claremont, a son of Edward Stopford Claremont, in 1872.
- Sir Lionel Edward Darell, 5th Baronet (1845–1919), who married Helen Frances Marshland, only child of Edward Marshland of Henbury Park, Cheshire, in 1870.
- Edward Tierney Gilchrist Darell (1847–1898), a Lieutenant in the Gloucestershire Yeomanry who married Amy Schuster, daughter of Leo Schuster, in 1869. They divorced in 1878 (she married Hon. Cecil Molyneux Howard, youngest son of the 17th Earl of Suffolk) and he married Florence (née Johnson) Broadwood, widow of Thomas Broadwood of Holmbush and daughter of William Johnson, in 1882.

After his second wife's death in 1873, he married Fanny Julia (née Braithwaite) Clarke (d. 1894) on 7 January 1880 at St George's, Hanover Square. The widow of Tanner Owen Clarke (a son of Edward Hyde Clarke), she was a daughter of Alfred Braithwaite and Elizabeth Fuller.

Sir William died in 1883 and was succeeded in the baronetcy by his eldest son, Lionel.

=== Descendants ===
Through his younger son Edward, he was a grandfather of Florence Mary Darell, who became the Countess of Kinnoull upon her marriage to Archibald Hay, 13th Earl of Kinnoull.

Baronetage of Great Britain
Preceded by Harry Francis Colville Darell	Baronet (of Richmond Hill); 1853–1883	Succeeded by Lionel Edward Darell
