= Leonie Schroder =

Heiress and descendant of Bruno Schroder

- Born: Leonie Kira Emma Schroder; 1974 (age 51–52)
- Citizenship: British
- Education: University of St Andrews
- Title: Director, Schroders
- Term: March 2019-
- Spouse: Nicholas Francis Fane (m. 1997; div. 2014)
- Children: 3
- Parent: Bruno Schroder

Leonie Kira Emma Schroder (born 1974) is a British billionaire heiress, and the daughter of the late Bruno Schroder of the Schroders dynasty. After his death in March 2019, she took over his seat on the board of directors.

== Early life ==
Born in 1974, Leonie Kira Emma Schroder is the only child of Bruno Schroder and his first wife, Patricia "Piffa" Holt. She was educated at the University of St Andrews.

== Career ==
Schroder has been a director of the Schroder Charity Trust, the Red Squirrel Survival Trust and "various entities connected to Dunlossit, the family's large estate" on the Isle of Islay, off Scotland's west coast.

In March 2019, Schroders appointed her to fill the seat on its board left by her father's death two weeks earlier. This was despite her never having had a role at Schroders or any large financial services company. Other family members, such as her father, had spent years with the company before they became a board director.

In January 2020, Schroder and family were ranked third in a list of the UK's top 50 taxpayers, with an annual tax bill of £116.8 million on their £4 billion wealth. In May 2020, her net worth was estimated at £4.0 billion.

In February 2026, Leonie was listed on the Sunday Times Tax list with an estimated £113.4 million.

== Personal life ==
In 1997, she married Nicholas Francis Fane, an Old Etonian, in Westminster, London. They had three children together, and divorced in 2014. He died on 19 December 2014, "suddenly and tragically", aged 57, and his funeral was held on 8 January 2015 at St. Nicholas Church, Steventon, Hampshire. Fane was a keen sportsman, and in 2008, appeared in "The Field's 50 top shots", published by The Field magazine.

They bought the 1200-acre Hurstbourne Park estate in Whitchurch, Hampshire, formerly the home of Lord Portsmouth, from the Donner family in December 2000. A year later, they planned to demolish the remains of the 19th-century house and build a new one, whilst retaining the listed stable block, and the 19th century walled garden and pump house. They were planning on creating a semi-wild shooting estate. The park and garden is grade II listed.
