= Sir John Schroder, 1st Baronet =

Anglo-German banker (1825–1910)

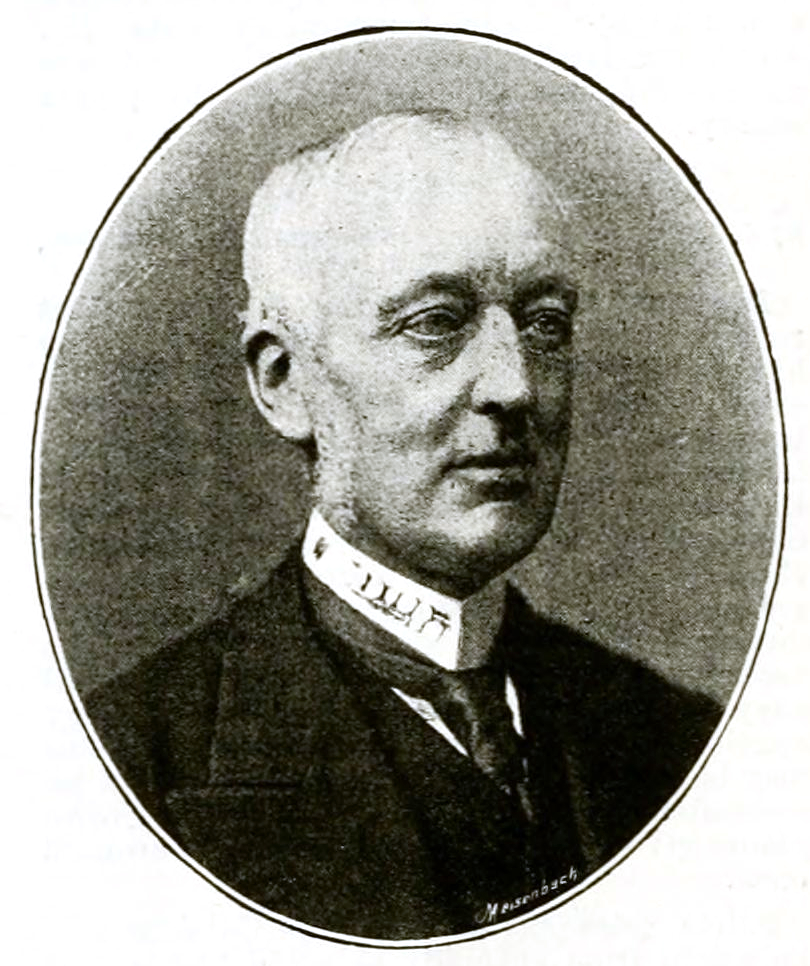

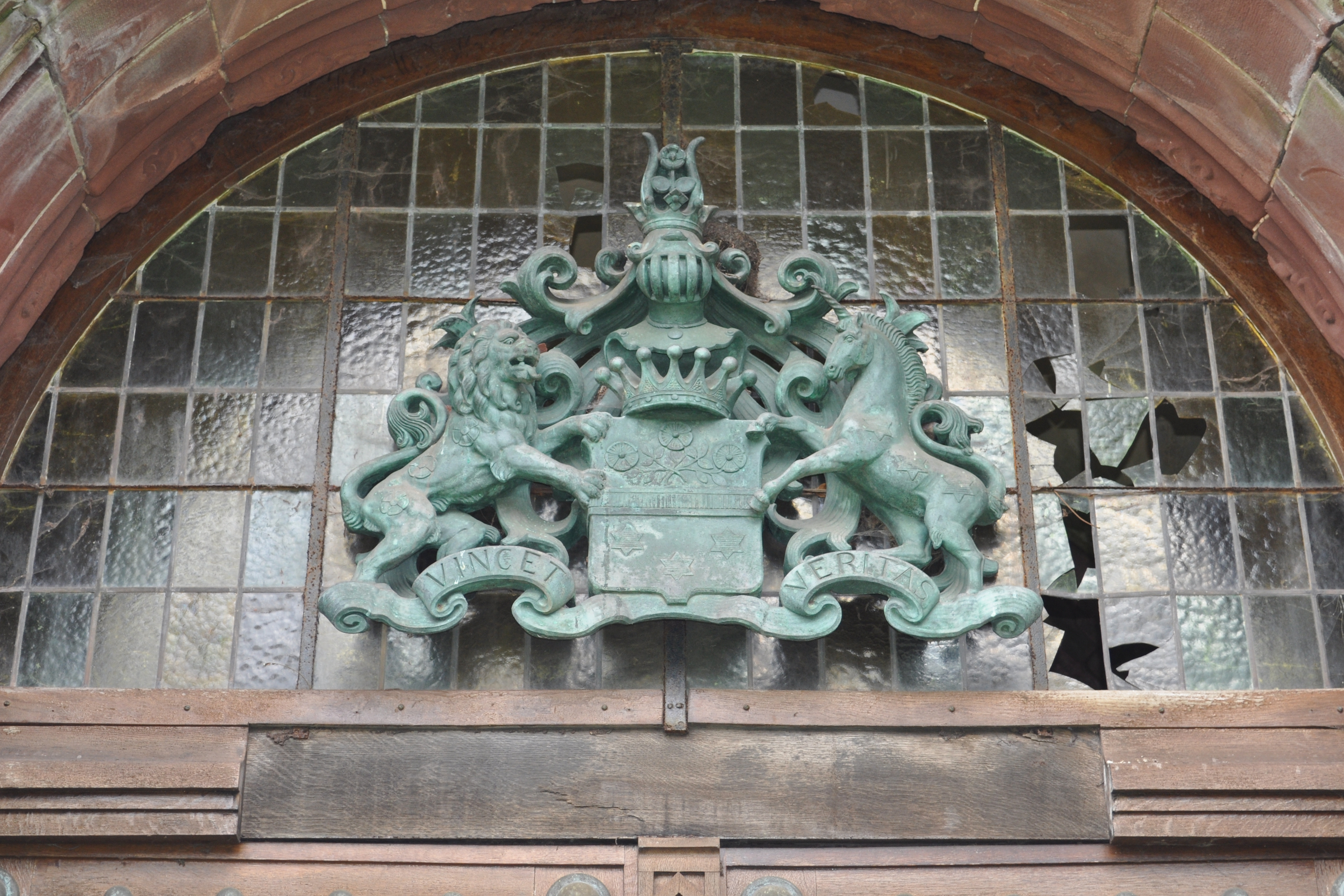
Schröder family arms, as used by the baronet

Sir John Henry William Schröder, 1st Baronet and Baron von Schröder (13 February 1825 – 20 April 1910) was an Anglo-German merchant banker, his firm later becoming Schroders PLC.

== Early life ==
He was born Baron Johann Heinrich Wilhelm Schröder in Hamburg, Germany, the fourth of 12 children of Baron Johann Heinrich von Schröder (in the Prussian nobility) and Henriette von Schwartz. Both his parents were from leading Hamburg merchant families.

== In business in London ==
In 1841, at the age of 16, Schröder joined the London office of the banking house founded by his father. From 1849 he was one of two London partners, the other being Alexander Schlüsser who was involved in commerce with Russia. Schröder himself became a significant figure in the Baltic Exchange. From 1853 the firm handled bond issues, notably in 1863 the "cotton bond" loan to the Confederate States it handled for Emile Erlanger & Co..

When Schlüsser retired in 1871, Henry Frederic Tiarks (1820–1911) was brought in as partner. He had married Schlüsser's adopted daughter. Later his son Frank Cyril Tiarks became a partner. With no children of his own, Schroder in 1895 appointed as partner Bruno Schroder, a nephew until then in Hamburg. He himself retired in 1910.

== Baron and baronet ==
Schröder's father in 1868 was made a Freiherr (baron) in the Kingdom of Prussia; Schröder himself was from then known in the United Kingdom as "Baron", a courtesy title until he inherited from his father in 1883. He was created a Baronet of The Dell (his house by Windsor Great Park) in the Baronetcy of the United Kingdom, on 8 December 1892. The title became extinct upon his death.

== Family ==
In 1850 Schröder married Dorothea Eveline Schlüsser, niece of his partner Alexander Schlüsser.

Baronetage of the United Kingdom
New creation	Baronet (of The Dell); 1892–1910	Extinct
Preceded by Hamilton baronets	Schroder baronets of The Dell; 8 December 1892	Succeeded by Abel baronets
