= High Halden =

Coordinates: 51.103°N 0.713°E

- Location within Kent
- Area: 15.18 km^{2} (5.86 sq mi)
- Population: 1,584 (Civil Parish 2011)
  - Density: 104/km^{2} (270/sq mi)
- OS grid reference: TQ899373
- Civil parish: High Halden
- District: Ashford
- Shire county: Kent
- Region: South East
- Country: England
- Sovereign state: United Kingdom
- Post town: Ashford
- Postcode district: TN26
- Dialling code: 01233
- Police: Kent
- Fire: Kent
- Ambulance: South East Coast
- UK Parliament: Weald of Kent
- Website: Village website

High Halden is a village and civil parish in the Ashford District of Kent, England. The village is on the A28 road between Ashford and Tenterden, 3 miles (5 km) north of the latter town. The Tenterden suburb of St. Michaels is included.

== History ==
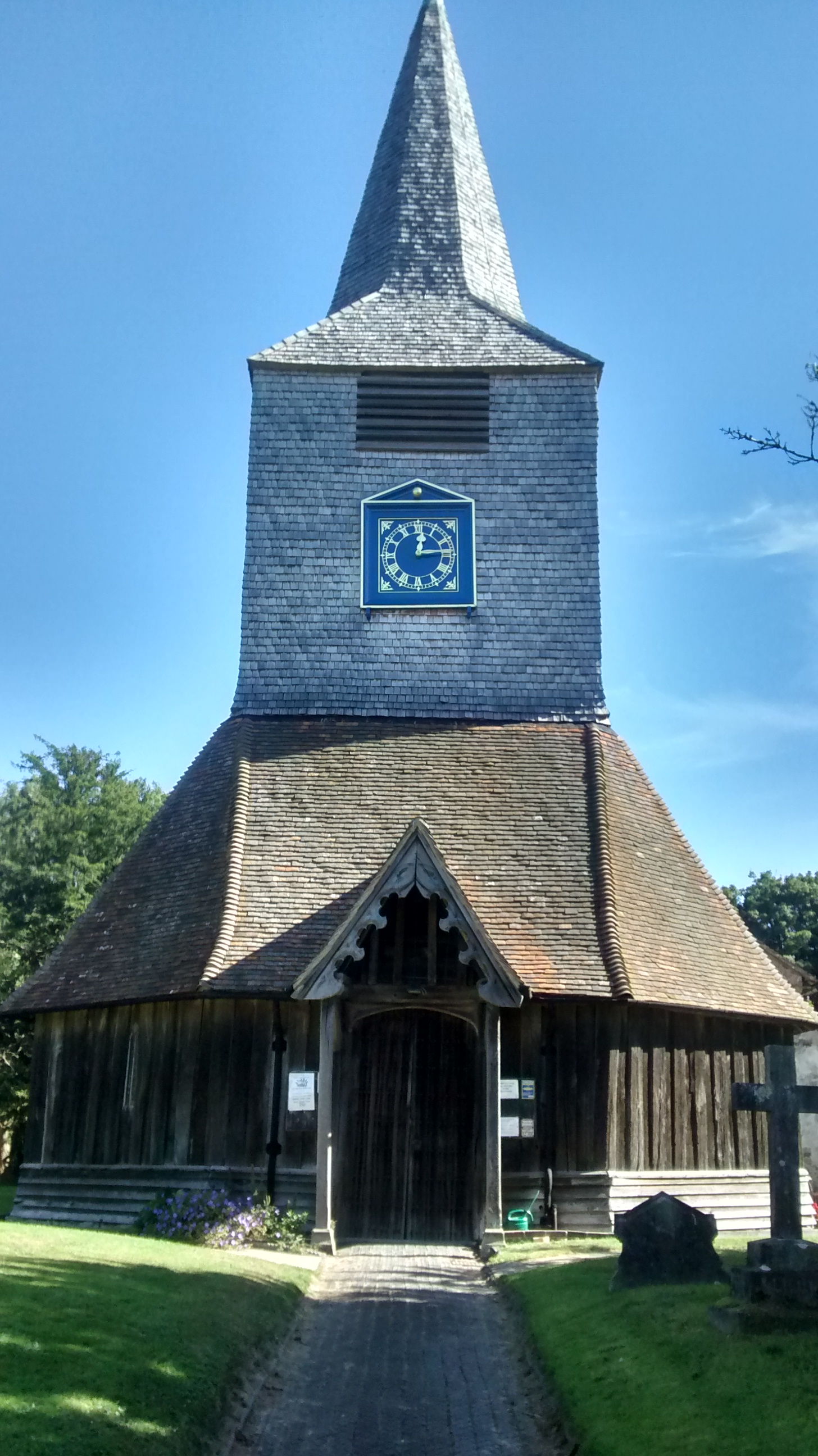
St Mary's Church in 2016

Fifty tons of oak was used to build the tower and spire of the 10th–14th-century church, St Mary the Virgin, in 1470–1490. The church was restored in 1835 through funds donated by Mrs. Amy Kynaston Sutton, widow of the former vicar Evelyn Levett Sutton and sister and sole heiress of her brother Sir John Roger Kynaston, Bart. The large pub The Chequers on the Green, circa 1620, is known to have been used by smugglers and the various gangs such as the "Hawkhurst and Cranbrook gangs" that were active in the mid-18th century. The parish is recorded in the Domesday Book and parts of a Norman manor house can be seen at Tiffenden Farm.

=== St Mary's Church ===
This Grade I listed church was built before 1286 (this being the first date for which there is a recorded name of a priest at the church, Richard de Halyngleghe). Although the church has been extended over the years, its most remarkable feature is the timbered tower which was probably constructed in the late 13th Century. It consists of an octagonal ground floor and a square upper story above which rises an 80-foot octagonal shingle-clad spire. The whole structure is braced and strengthened by a system of massive oak pillars, beams and trusses. The 14th Century South porch has an entrance which is a natural arch made of two halves of a colossal oak trunk and inside the church there is a 13th Century font.

=== RAF High Halden ===
RAF High Halden is a former Royal Air Force Advanced Landing Ground in Kent, England

== See also ==
- Listed buildings in High Halden
