= Dattalla =

Dattalla or Datala (Ancient Greek: Δαττάλλα) was a town of ancient Crete. The inhabitants of Dattalla are documented in a decree dated at the end of the sixth century BCE, that deals with the agreement of the city with a scribe for the public affairs of the city.

Its exact location is unknown but it must have been located between Knossos and Lato. The modern Afrati has been suggested as a possible location - although some identify that site with Arcadia - or the hill Agios Georgios Papura near the town of Pinakiano.
