= Financial signal processing =

Financial signal processing is a branch of signal processing technologies which applies to signals within financial markets. They are often used by quantitative analysts to make best estimation of the movement of financial markets, such as stock prices, options prices, or other types of derivatives.

== History ==
The modern start of financial signal processing is often credited to Claude Shannon. Shannon was the inventor of modern communication theory. He discovered the capacity of a communication channel by analyzing entropy of information.

For a long time, financial signal processing technologies have been used by different hedge funds, such as Jim Simons's Renaissance Technologies. However, hedge funds usually do not reveal their trade secrets. Some early research results in this area are summarized by R.H. Tütüncü and M. Koenig and by T.M. Cover, J.A. Thomas. In 2015, A.N. Akansu and M.U. Torun published A Primer for Financial Engineering: Financial Signal Processing and Electronic Trading. An edited volume with the title Financial Signal Processing and Machine Learning was published the following year.

The first IEEE International Conference on Acoustics, Speech, and Signal Processing session on Financial Signal Processing was organized at ICASSP 2011 in Prague, Czech Republic. There were two special issues of IEEE Journal of Selected Topics in Signal Processing published on Signal Processing Methods in Finance and Electronic Trading in 2012, and on Financial Signal Processing and Machine Learning for Electronic Trading in 2016 in addition to the special section on Signal Processing for Financial Applications in IEEE Signal Processing Magazine appeared in 2011.

== Financial signal processing in academia ==
Recently, a new research group in Imperial College London has been formed which focuses on Financial Signal Processing as part of the Communication and Signal Processing Group of the Electrical and Electronic Engineering department, led by Anthony G. Constantinides. In June 2014, the group started a collaboration with the Schroders Multi-Asset Investments and Portfolio Solutions (MAPS) team on multi-asset study.

Other research groups working on the financial signal processing include the Convex Research Group of Prof. Daniel Palomar and the Signal Processing and Computational Biology Group led by Prof. Matthew R. McKay at the Hong Kong University of Science and Technology and Stanford University Convex Optimization Group led by Prof. Stephen Boyd at the Stanford University. There are also open source libraries available for index tracking and portfolio optimization.

== Financial signal processing in industry ==
- Vivienne Investissement: multifractality for asset price, covariance estimation for asset allocation;
- NM FinTech;
- Sanostro: On the back of a lack of market place for signals, Sanostro AG, headquartered in Switzerland, created the first B2B signal market place providing signals on all liquid assets. Sanostro allows signal providers (hedge funds, quant teams of institutional investors, etc.) to provide their signals, standardize them, so that their track record can be audited. The signals themselves can then be re-combined for B2B purposes, like dynamic FX hedging, tactical asset allocation, equity upside capture;
- SkyBlue FS: Their SkyBlue OpenSignals product offers AI-powered signals and trade setups that can be accessed via API service.

== See also ==
- Financial engineering
