= Edward Kynaston =

Edward Kynaston may refer to:

- Edward Kynaston (actor) (c. 1640–1712), English actor
- Edward Kynaston (1709–1772), MP
- Sir Edward Kynaston, 2nd Baronet (1758–1839) of the Kynaston baronets
