= Sandaire Investment Office =

Sandaire
- Company type: Subsidiary
- Industry: Investment Management
- Predecessor: Lord North Street, SandAire
- Founded: 1996; 30 years ago
- Founder: Alex Scott
- Headquarters: London, United Kingdom
- Services: Family office, investment management
- Owner: Cazenove (subisidiary of Schroders)
- Number of employees: 1 - 50 (2021)
- Website: sandaire.com

Sandaire Investment Office is an investment office that delivers tailored investment portfolios and solutions for wealthy families and foundations. The firm serves 45 families and manages in excess of £3bn in assets.

The firm, which is based in Marylebone, London, United Kingdom was founded in 1996. In 2012, the company opened an office in Singapore which acts as a hub for its activities in Asia.

== History ==
The firm was founded by Alex Scott to manage the wider Scott family's wealth following the sales of Provincial Insurance and Exeter Bank. The family had owned Provincial Insurance and Exeter Bank for five generations and collaborated with economist John Maynard Keynes in its development.

Scott is the Chairman of Sandaire and remains the Non-Executive Director of his family's investment holding company and Director of several private companies. He is also a Trustee of The Grosvenor Estate, Chairman of Wheatsheaf Investments and co-founded the Institute for Family Business (UK).

In 2014, SandAire merged with Lord North Street, also a multi-family investment office based in London and founded by barristers Adam Wethered and William Drake in 2000. The firms re-branded as Sandaire Investment Office in early 2015.

In September 2020, Schroders subsidiary Cazenove bought London-based Sandaire.
