= William Darell (British Army officer) =

British Army officer and rower (1878–1954)

Brigadier-General William Darell CMG DSO
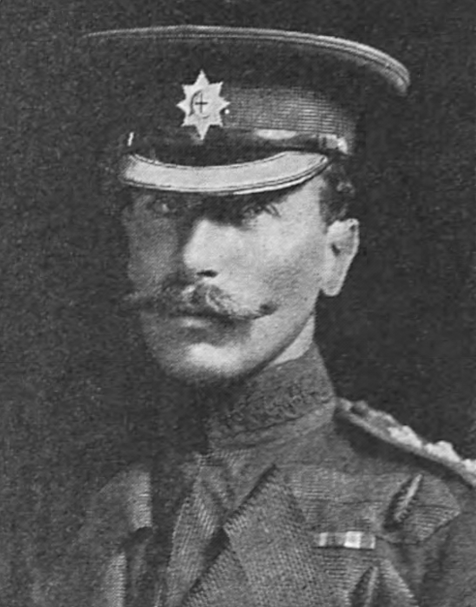
- Born: William Harry Verelst Darell; 23 January 1878; Earley, England
- Died: 7 February 1954 (aged 76); London, England
- Education: Eton College
- Spouse: Eva Jeffie Bainbridge (m. 1907)

Brigadier-General William Harry Verelst Darell CMG DSO (23 January 1878 – 7 February 1954) was a British Army officer and rower who won the Diamond Challenge Sculls at Henley Royal Regatta.

== Early life ==
Darell was born in Earley, the second son of Sir Lionel Darell, 5th Baronet. The Darell family derived its fortune from service in the East India Company in the late eighteenth century. Darell was educated at Eton College and went on to Royal Military Academy Sandhurst where in a brilliant career he won the Sword of Honour.

== Career ==
Darell was commissioned into the Coldstream Guards as a second lieutenant on 8 September 1897, and promoted to lieutenant on 18 January 1899. He served in South Africa through the Second Boer War 1899–1902; where he took part in operations in the Orange Free State (April to May 1900), the Transvaal (May to June 1900, July to November 1900) and Cape Colony; and was present at several major battles, including at Belmont, Enslin and Modder River (November 1899), Magersfontein (December 1899), Poplar Grove and Driefontein (March 1900), Vet River, Zand River, Johannesburg, Pretoria and Diamond Hill (June 1900), Bergendal and Komatipoort (August 1900). From July 1901 he was signaling officer to a Mobile column. Following the end of the war, he return to the United Kingdom in August 1902.

Darell entered the Staff College in 1913 and on the outbreak of World War I in August 1914 was posted as a major to Southampton, where as deputy assistant adjutant-general he helped to execute the deployment of the BEF to France. When he went to war it was as deputy adjutant and quartermaster general of 7th Division and he was promoted assistant adjutant and quartermaster general of 3rd Division on 3 July 1915. He was awarded the DSO in 1915. His final promotion was to DA&QMG of IV Corps on 24 December 1916 when he succeeded W. L. White, who was twenty-two years his senior. Darell held the post for the rest of the war. He was mentioned in despatches in 1917 Darell remained in the army after the war becoming Colonel on 1 October 1920, with seniority from 1 January 1919. He was Deputy Director of Mobilisation and Recruiting at the War Office in 1920 and Assistant Adjutant-General, War Office, in 1921. After commanding 1st Battalion Irish Guards from 1924 to 1928, he retired from the Army in 1929.

=== Sporting achievements ===
Darell was an eminent single sculler, competing for the Household Brigade Boat Club. In 1906 he was runner-up to Harry Blackstaffe in the Diamond Challenge Sculls at Henley. In 1907 he won the Diamond Sculls beating Alexander McCulloch and competed in the Wingfield Sculls.

=== Freemasonry ===
Darell was a prominent and senior Freemason of his generation. He was initiated in the Studholme Lodge No 1591 on 24 March 1899, aged 21. He was passed to the second degree in the same lodge on 26 May 1899, and raised to the third degree in Argonauts Lodge No 2243 on 20 October 1899. Very unusually, just a month after his raising he became a founder member of the Lodge of Assistance No 2773, becoming the Worshipful Master of that lodge in 1905.

Darell went on to join a large number of other lodges, many of them of prominent position within English Freemasonry, including: the Royal Somerset House & Inverness Lodge No 4, one of the founding lodges of the world's first Grand Lodge in 1717; Foxhunters Lodge; Old Etonian Lodge; Household Brigade Lodge; Bard of Avon Lodge; and Royal Alpha Lodge, membership of which is at the personal invitation of the Grand Master.

In 1937 he was appointed Assistant Grand Master (the third most senior position) in the United Grand Lodge of England, also serving from 1942 as Provincial Grand Master for Warwickshire. He also held senior positions in most of the additional Masonic bodies.

== Personal life ==
On 26 October 1907 at St George's, Hanover Square, Darell married Eva Jeffie Bainbridge, a daughter of Emerson Muschamp Bainbridge, MP for Gainsborough. Together, they were the parents of:

- Elizabeth Joy Darell, who married Peter Julian Clive, son of Sir Robert Henry Clive and Hon. Magdalen Muir Mackenzie (a daughter of the 1st Baron Muir Mackenzie), in 1934. They divorced in 1945.
- William Oswald Darell (1910–1959), who succeeded to the baronetcy in 1954 upon the death of his uncle, Sir Lionel Darell, 6th Baronet.

Darell died in London on 7 February 1954, aged 76, and was buried at Saul, Gloucestershire.
