= Listed buildings in High Halden =

Historic structures in Kent, England

High Halden is a village and civil parish in the Borough of Ashford of Kent, England. It contains one grade I, one grade II* and 45 grade II listed buildings that are recorded in the National Heritage List for England.

This list is based on the information retrieved online from Historic England

== Key ==
Grade	Criteria
I	Buildings that are of exceptional interest
II*	Particularly important buildings of more than special interest
II	Buildings that are of special interest

== Listing ==
Name	Grade	Location	Type	Completed (Note: The date given is the date used by Historic England as significant for the initial building or that of an important part in the structure's description.)	Date designated	Grid ref. (Note: The grid reference is based on the British national grid reference system, sometimes known as OSGB36, used by the Ordnance Survey.) Geo-coordinates	Notes	Entry number (Note: The "List Entry Number" is a unique number assigned to each listed building and scheduled monument by Historic England.)	Image	Wikidata
Bachelors Farm	II				16 June 1986	TQ9056636735; 51°05′54″N 0°43′13″E		1275696	Upload Photo	Q26565258
Bv and J Cooke Stores High Halden Post Office	II				9 August 1979	TQ9011237229; 51°06′10″N 0°42′51″E		1186035	Upload Photo	Q26481308
Church House	II				16 August 1962	TQ9017337313; 51°06′13″N 0°42′54″E		1070962	Upload Photo	Q26325633
Crampton	II				9 August 1979	TQ8787437742; 51°06′29″N 0°40′57″E		1362886	Upload Photo	Q26644748
Garden Wall to Hathewolden Grange	II				9 August 1979	TQ8995637300; 51°06′13″N 0°42′43″E		1186039	Upload Photo	Q26481311
Hathewolden Grange	II				16 August 1962	TQ8994837326; 51°06′14″N 0°42′42″E		1070964	Upload Photo	Q26325637
London Beach Cottage	II				9 August 1979	TQ8835936503; 51°05′49″N 0°41′19″E		1070965	Upload Photo	Q26325640
Marten Farmhouse	II				9 August 1979	TQ9203737913; 51°06′30″N 0°44′31″E		1186044	Upload Photo	Q26481317
Parish Church of St Mary	I				16 August 1962	TQ9016337237; 51°06′10″N 0°42′53″E		1185888	Parish Church of St Mary More images	Q17529360
Pope House Farmhouse	II				9 August 1979	TQ8859035666; 51°05′21″N 0°41′30″E		1186042	Upload Photo	Q26481314
Summerhill	II				9 August 1979	TQ9000137326; 51°06′13″N 0°42′45″E		1186037	Upload Photo	Q26481309
The Chequers Inn	II				4 June 1952	TQ9002537343; 51°06′14″N 0°42′46″E		1070963	The Chequers Inn More images	Q26325635
Tiffenden Manor	II				9 August 1979	TQ9089936344; 51°05′41″N 0°43′29″E		1070966	Upload Photo	Q26325643
K6 Telephone Kiosk	II	Ashford Road			13 July 1989	TQ9008937345; 51°06′14″N 0°42′50″E		1216885	Upload Photo	Q26511636
Sunnydale	II	Ashford Road			9 August 1979	TQ9075837544; 51°06′20″N 0°43′24″E		1186046	Upload Photo	Q26481319
Tanden	II	Ashford Road			9 August 1979	TQ9142838160; 51°06′39″N 0°44′00″E		1070967	Upload Photo	Q26325647
Church Farmhouse	II	Church Hill			16 August 1962	TQ9016937144; 51°06′07″N 0°42′53″E		1362887	Upload Photo	Q26644749
Duxbury	II	Church Hill			9 August 1979	TQ9020337164; 51°06′08″N 0°42′55″E		1299367	Upload Photo	Q26586776
Oasthouse at Church Farm	II	Church Hill			9 August 1979	TQ9016337115; 51°06′06″N 0°42′53″E		1299400	Upload Photo	Q26586806
Village School and School House	II	Church Hill			9 August 1979	TQ9012337190; 51°06′09″N 0°42′51″E		1070968	Upload Photo	Q26325649
War Memorial in the Grounds of Church of St Mary the Virgin	II	Church Hill			17 March 2005	TQ9013737239; 51°06′10″N 0°42′52″E		1407263	War Memorial in the Grounds of Church of St Mary the Virgin More images	Q26675922
Old Place Farmhouse	II	Colliers Hill			9 August 1979	TQ9083737144; 51°06′07″N 0°43′28″E		1362888	Upload Photo	Q26644750
Colman's Farmhouse	II	Crampton			9 August 1979	TQ8815338822; 51°07′04″N 0°41′13″E		1299351	Upload Photo	Q26586761
Durrants Court	II	Durrants Green			9 August 1979	TQ8867236843; 51°05′59″N 0°41′36″E		1070970	Upload Photo	Q26325654
Homestall Farmhouse	II	Durrants Green			16 October 1978	TQ8873036840; 51°05′59″N 0°41′39″E		1070969	Upload Photo	Q26325651
Moat House	II	Durrants Green			9 August 1979	TQ8846536829; 51°05′59″N 0°41′25″E		1186133	Upload Photo	Q26481406
Brickhouse Farmhouse	II	Further Quarter			9 August 1979	TQ8861238988; 51°07′09″N 0°41′37″E		1362890	Upload Photo	Q26644751
Broombourne Farmhouse	II	Further Quarter			9 August 1979	TQ9000339054; 51°07′09″N 0°42′49″E		1070972	Upload Photo	Q26325658
Dents Farmhouse	II	Further Quarter			9 August 1979	TQ8954839053; 51°07′10″N 0°42′25″E		1186192	Upload Photo	Q26481460
Haffenden	II	Further Quarter			16 August 1962	TQ8961439133; 51°07′12″N 0°42′29″E		1070971	Upload Photo	Q26325655
Old House Farmhouse	II	Further Quarter			9 August 1979	TQ8975539315; 51°07′18″N 0°42′36″E		1186187	Upload Photo	Q26481455
Potkiln Farmhouse	II*	Further Quarter			16 August 1962	TQ8982439325; 51°07′18″N 0°42′40″E		1362889	Upload Photo	Q17556934
Pottery Farmhouse	II	Further Quarter			9 August 1979	TQ9031339438; 51°07′21″N 0°43′05″E		1186198	Upload Photo	Q26481466
Bridge Farmhouse	II	Middle Quarter			9 August 1979	TQ8949838222; 51°06′43″N 0°42′21″E		1362911	Upload Photo	Q26644771
Black Cottage	II	Tenterden Road			9 August 1979	TQ8884636912; 51°06′01″N 0°41′45″E		1070936	Upload Photo	Q26325577
Bourne Cottage	II	Tenterden Road			9 August 1979	TQ8933437260; 51°06′12″N 0°42′11″E		1070935	Upload Photo	Q26325574
Chennells	II	Tenterden Road			9 August 1979	TQ8941237306; 51°06′14″N 0°42′15″E		1070934	Upload Photo	Q26325572
Dragon House Larasset	II	Tenterden Road			9 August 1979	TQ8987137273; 51°06′12″N 0°42′38″E		1070932	Upload Photo	Q26325567
Hope House	II	Tenterden Road			9 August 1979	TQ8944037262; 51°06′12″N 0°42′16″E		1362912	Upload Photo	Q26644772
Hope's Grove Cottage	II	Tenterden Road			9 August 1979	TQ8965437329; 51°06′14″N 0°42′27″E		1070933	Upload Photo	Q26325570
Verrall Cottage	II	Tenterden Road			16 August 1962	TQ8935937280; 51°06′13″N 0°42′12″E		1362913	Upload Photo	Q26644773
Chestnut House	II	The Green			16 August 1962	TQ9010237248; 51°06′11″N 0°42′50″E		1186210	Upload Photo	Q26481476
Forge House	II	The Green			9 August 1979	TQ9001537292; 51°06′12″N 0°42′46″E		1070973	Upload Photo	Q26325659
Jessamine Cottage	II	The Green			9 August 1979	TQ9008937371; 51°06′15″N 0°42′50″E		1070930	Upload Photo	Q26325562
Lion House	II	The Green			16 August 1962	TQ9008237274; 51°06′12″N 0°42′49″E		1362891	Upload Photo	Q26644752
Little Robscot	II	The Green			16 August 1962	TQ9004937446; 51°06′17″N 0°42′48″E		1362910	Upload Photo	Q26644770
National Westminster Bank the Cot the Green the White House Stores	II	The Green			9 August 1979	TQ9006137372; 51°06′15″N 0°42′48″E		1070931	Upload Photo	Q26325565

== See also ==
- Grade I listed buildings in Kent
- Grade II* listed buildings in Kent

== Sources ==
- Newman, John (2012) [1969], Kent: West and the Weald, The Buildings of England, New Haven and London: Yale University Press, ISBN 978-0-300-18509-6
