= Matthew John Tierney =

Sir Matthew John Tierney, 1st Baronet (24 November 1776 – 28 October 1845) was an Irish surgeon who became Physician-in-Ordinary to Kings George IV and William IV of the United Kingdom. He gained a reputation for his study of vaccination.

== Early life ==
He was born the eldest son of John Tierney of Ballyscandland, County Limerick and Mary, daughter of James Gleeson, of Rathkinnon, in the same county.

He commenced his medical education at the United Borough hospitals under the superintendence of Dr. Saunders and Dr. Babington.

== Career ==
In 1798, Tierney was appointed by the Earl of Berkeley as surgeon to his lordship's regiment of militia. In the same year he made the acquaintance of the smallpox vaccine pioneer Dr. Edward Jenner in Gloucestershire. He then went on to study at Edinburgh and Glasgow where he commenced his study of vaccination. Tierney gained the attention of Dr. James Gregory, the distinguished author of the Conspectus medicinae theoreticae, whose eldest son he vaccinated.

Tierney graduated doctor of medicine in Glasgow in 1802; he selected cowpock as his inaugural essay. He was admitted a Licentiate of the College of Physicians in 1806. In the summer of 1802 he settled as a physician at Brighton, where he contributed materially to the formation of a vaccine institution in that town – the first that was established outside London.

At Brighton Tierney was presented by his patron the Earl of Berkeley to the Prince of Wales (the future King George IV), who soon afterwards appointed him physician to his household there. In 1809 he was appointed physician extraordinary to the Prince of Wales, and in 1816, physician in ordinary to the Prince Regent. He was created a baronet (Baron Tierney of Brighthelmstone) in October 1818, and in the medical arrangements consequent to the accession of George IV, was gazetted physician in ordinary to the king. He was continued in the same high office by King William IV, who in 1831 created him a knight commander of the Royal Guelphic Order of Hanover.

Tierney published his Observations on Variola Vaccina, or Cow Pock in 1840.

== Personal life ==
He died at his residence on the Pavilion Parade, Brighton and was buried in his family vault at St Nicholas' Rest Garden. The site is marked with an engraved plaque mounted at its entrance.

Having no issue, his titles passed to his brother, Edward Tierney of Dublin.

== See also ==
- Tierney baronets

== References and sources ==
Baronetage of the United Kingdom
| New creation | Baronet (of Brighton); 1818–1845 | Extinct |
| New creation | Baronet (of Brighton); 1834–1845 | Succeeded by Edward Tierney |
