= Bruno Schroder =

British banker (1933–2019)

- Born: Bruno Lionel Schroder; 17 January 1933
- Died: 20 February 2019 (aged 86)
- Education: Eton College
- Alma mater: University of Tours; University College, Oxford; Harvard Business School
- Occupation: Banker
- Spouse(s): Patricia "Piffa" Holt; Suzanne von Maltzahn
- Children: Leonie Schroder

Bruno Lionel Schroder (17 January 1933 – 20 February 2019) was a British banker and billionaire and a significant landowner in Scotland. He was a direct descendant of Johann Heinrich Schröder, co-founder of financial institution Schroders, and the longest serving non-executive board member of any company on the London FTSE 100. Forbes magazine estimated Schroder's family wealth at US$6.2 billion in August 2018.

Schroder owned the 17,500 acres Dunlossit Estate on the island of Islay in Scotland's Inner Hebrides.

== Early life ==
He was born on 17 January 1933, to Baron Helmut William Bruno Schröder and Margaret Eleanor Phyllis Darell. His sister, Baroness Charmaine Brenda Schröder, married merchant banker George von Mallinckrodt.

His maternal grandparents were Sir Lionel Darell, 6th Baronet and the former Eleanor Marion Edwards-Heathcote (daughter of Justinian Edwards-Heathcote, MP for North West Staffordshire).

He was educated at Eton, University of Tours, the School of Languages Hamburg, University College, Oxford, and Harvard Business School. Schroder received an honorary doctorate from Heriot-Watt University in 2012.

== Career ==
Schroder joined the commercial banking and corporate finance division of J. Henry Schroder Wagg & Co. in 1960, and was appointed a director of Schroders in 1963. Schroder was a non-executive director of Schroders and a member of the company's nominations committee. In 2017 Schroder donated £50,000 to the "Remain" campaign against Brexit as well as the campaign against Scotland leaving the UK.

In August 2018, Schroder's net worth was estimated at $6.2 billion.

== Personal life ==
In 1969, Schroder married Piffa Holt. Before their divorce, they were the parents of a daughter:

- Leonie Schroder. In August 2018, Schroders were considering offering his daughter Leonie Schroder his seat on the main board, which he had held since 1963, when he stepped down. Schroder and his daughter were both on the board of the Dunlossit and Islay Community Trust.

His second wife was Danish-born Baroness Suzanne von Maltzahn (née Reventlow-Mourier). They divided the estate on Islay with Piffa, who has her own part of the estate and is in residence when Schroder was in London.

Schroder flew his private plane and was a keen breeder of Middle White pigs on the Dunlossit Estate. Schroder funded the Islay lifeboat and sponsored the island's Highland games, the Argyllshire Gathering. Schroder also helped restore an old whisky distillery on Islay. Schroder was one of a number of wealthy individuals who cashed a cheque for 97 pence sent to them by Bizarre magazine in 2001.

He died on 20 February 2019, aged 86, "after a short illness".

Coat of arms of Bruno Schroder

Motto
Vincet Veritas
