= Hurstbourne Park =

Country house and estate in England

Coordinates: 51.226°N 1.371°W

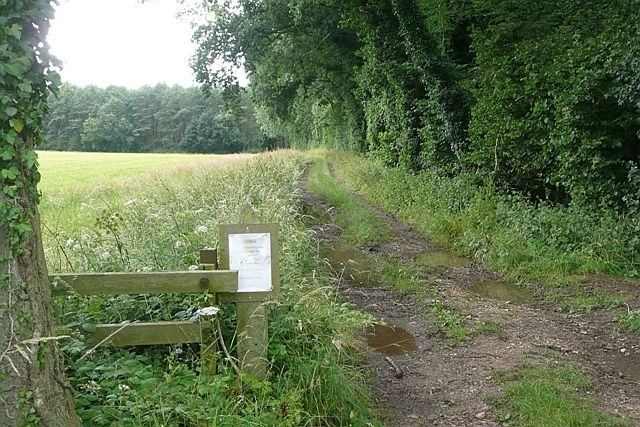
Private footpath, Hurstbourne Park estate, 2008

Hurstbourne Park is a country house and 1200-acre estate near Whitchurch, Hampshire, England.

The park and garden are Grade II listed with Historic England since May 1984, "A late C18 landscape park and pleasure ground surrounding a late C19 house with formal terracing which incorporates a wooded deer park of C14 origin and surviving features from landscape designs of the early C18 by Thomas Archer."

It has been owned by Sir Robert Oxenbridge, and his grandson, also Sir Robert, Sir Henry Farley, and his grandson, John Wallop, 1st Earl of Portsmouth.

John Wallop, 2nd Earl of Portsmouth inherited Hurstbourne in 1762, and from 1780 to 1785, a new house was built by John Meadows, designed by James Wyatt (1747-1813). In 1891, it burned down, and Isaac Newton Wallop, 5th Earl of Portsmouth died a few months later. His son, Newton Wallop, 6th Earl of Portsmouth, had a new house built in 1891 to 1894.

In 1936, the house and the deer park was sold to Ossian Donner, who gave it to his son Patrick Donner. During the Second World War it was used by the Bank of England, and Sir Patrick regained possession in 1947 and reduced the house to just under half its original size in 1965.

In December 2000, Leonie Schroder and her then-husband Nicholas Fane bought the 1200-acre estate from the Donner family. A year later, they planned to demolish the remains of the 19th-century house and build a new one, whilst retaining the listed stable block, and the 19th century walled garden and pump house. They were planning on creating a semi-wild shooting estate.
