= London Square (property development company) =

Property developer based in London

Coordinates: 51.5482°N 0.4768°W

London Square is a Abu Dhabi owned British property developer based in Uxbridge, London. It was established in 2010 and purchased by Aldar Properties, a real estate and investment company owned by the Government of Abu Dhabi in 2023.

Among London Square's developments is part of Nine Elms, a rejuvenation project nearby to Battersea Power Station which was also part of a wider redevelopment. The company also took on ownership of sites in Wimbledon, Battersea and Lambeth for redevelopment.
