= Daniel Palomar =

Daniel P. Palomar
- Daniel Pérez Palomar
- Born: Barcelona
- Education: Technical University of Catalonia; King's College London
- Awards: IEEE Fellow (2013); Fulbright Scholarship (2004-2006)
- Scientific career
- Fields: Signal processing Convex optimization Financial engineering
- Workplaces: The Hong Kong University of Science and Technology
- Thesis: A Unified Framework for Communications through MIMO Channels (2003)
- Doctoral advisor: Miguel Angel Lagunas
- Website: www.danielppalomar.com

Daniel Palomar is an electrical engineer at the Hong Kong University of Science and Technology (HKUST), in Clear Water Bay, Hong Kong. He was named a Fellow of the Institute of Electrical and Electronics Engineers (IEEE) in 2013 for his contributions to convex optimization-based signal processing for communications.

== Websites ==
- Daniel Palomar
- Daniel Palomar publications indexed by Google Scholar
- Daniel P. Palomar on GitHub
