= Foto Afrati =

Greek computer scientist

Foto N. Afrati is a Greek computer scientist whose research involves distributed computing, distributed database queries, and approximation algorithms, especially using MapReduce. She is a retired professor in the School of Electrical and Computing Engineering at the National Technical University of Athens.

== Education and career ==
Afrati studied electrical and mechanical engineering at the National Technical University of Athens, earning a diploma in 1976. She completed a PhD in 1980 at Imperial College London, with the dissertation Error Correcting Codes by Algorithms, supervised by Anthony G. Constantinides.

After postdoctoral research in electrical engineering at the National Technical University of Athens, she obtained a position there as lecturer in computer science in 1982. She was promoted to assistant professor in 1985, associate professor in 1989, and full professor in 1993.

== Book ==
Afrati is a coauthor of the book Answering Queries Using Views (with Rada Chirkova, Synthesis Lectures on Data Management, Morgan & Claypool, 2017; 2nd ed., 2019). She is also an author of two Greek-language textbooks.

== Recognition ==
Afrati was named as an ACM Fellow in 2014, "for contributions to the theory of database systems".
