= Johann Heinrich Schröder =

German investment banker

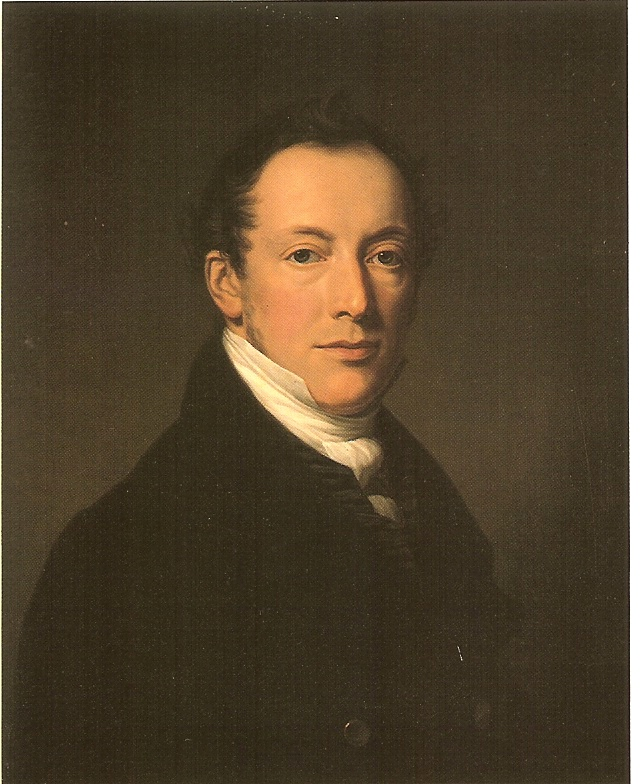
- Portrait, c. 1819
- Born: 12 December 1784; Hamburg, Holy Roman Empire (now Germany)
- Died: 28 June 1883 (aged 98); London, United Kingdom
- Occupations: Banker; Businessman
- Organization: Schroders
- Title: Freiherr

Johann Heinrich Schröder (12 December 1784 – 28 June 1883) was a member of the Schröder family of Hamburg, who settled in London and founded Schroders, one of the United Kingdom's largest investment banks.

== Early life ==
Schröder was born on 12 December 1784 in Hamburg to the prominent merchant (and First Mayor of Hamburg) Christian Matthias Schröder and his wife, Luise Mutzenbecher, from the notable Mutzenbecher family. Schröder's family was Lutheran.

== Career ==
Having been admitted to his older brother's firm, J. F. Schröder & Co., at the age of 16, Johann Heinrich Schröder (John Henry Schröder) learnt about acting as principal in the shipping of commodities such as sugar and about acting as an acceptor of bills of exchange from an early age.

He then went on to form his own firms: J. Henry Schröder & Co. in London in 1818 and J. H. Schröder & Co. in Hamburg in 1819. In 1829 John Henry was appointed Russian Vice-consul in Hamburg and this enabled him to establish expertise in exporting commodities to Russia. The London firm shipped indigo and sugar to St Petersburg while the Hamburg firm shipped coffee and sugar to St Petersburg.

In 1839 he established a third firm, J. H. Schröder & Co., in Liverpool, receiving consignments of cotton from the Southern United States.

By the 1840s he was one of the United Kingdom's leading guarantors of bills of exchange relating to textile shipments.

He retired from the business in 1849 aged 65 and retired to his country estate at Gross Schwansee in Mecklenburg (Kalkhorst) which he had bought in 1846. In retirement, he established a home for the elderly known as the Schröder Stiftung, and in 1868 he was made a Prussian Freiherr with the title of Baron Johann Heinrich von Schröder.

== Family ==
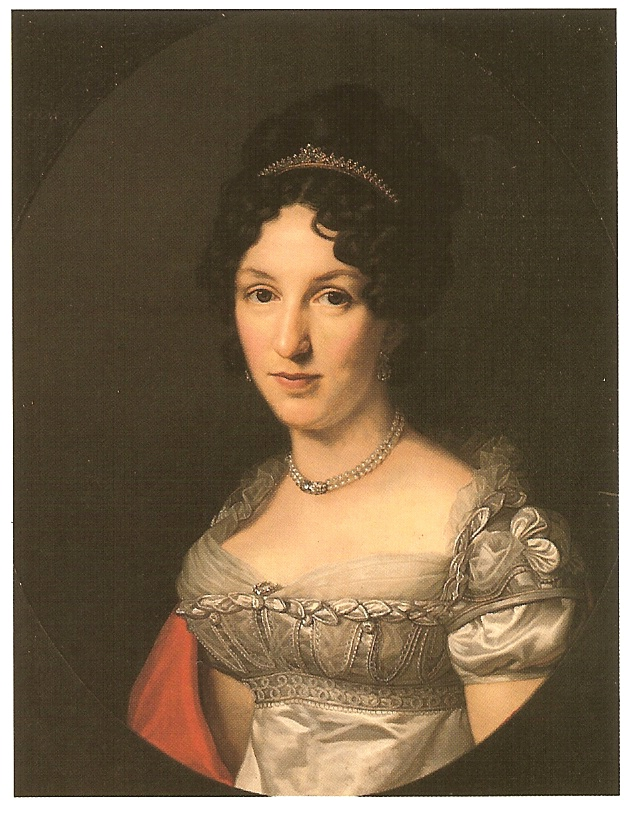
Henriette Schröder

Schröder married Henriette von Schwartz in 1819. Together, they had three sons and six daughters. His son John Henry William Schroder was also a banker and helped to expand the firm started by his father.

== Sources ==
- Roberts, Richard (1992). Schroders, Merchants & Bankers. Basingstoke, UK: Macmillan Press. ISBN 0-333-44511-2.
