= Anthony G. Constantinides =

Anthony Constantinides
- Born: 1943 (age 82–83)
- Scientific career
- Fields: Digital signal processing Financial signal processing
- Workplaces: Imperial College London
- Doctoral advisor: George Stanley Brayshaw; Dennis Gabor
- Doctoral students: Foto Afrati

Anthony George Constantinides FREng FIET (born 1943) is a professor of signal processing and the founder of the Communications and Signal Processing Group of the Department of Electrical and Electronic Engineering in Imperial College London. He has been actively involved with research in various aspects of digital filter design, digital signal processing, and communications for more than 40 years. Professor Constantinides' research spans a wide range of digital signal processing and communications, both from the theoretical as well as the practical points of view. His recent work has been directed toward the demanding problems arising in Financial signal processing and he now leads the Financial Signal Processing Lab in the EEE department of Imperial College London.

== Notable Contributions ==
Professor Constantinides has published several books and over 250 papers in learned journals in the area of digital signal processing and its applications. He has served as the First President of the European Association for Signal Processing (EURASIP) and has contributed in this capacity to the establishment of the European Journal for Signal Processing. He has been on, and is currently serving as, a member of many technical program committees of the IEEE, the IEE and other international conferences. He has organised the first-ever international series of meetings on digital signal processing, in London initially in 1967, and in Florence (with Vito Cappellini) since 1972.

In 1985 he was awarded the Honour of Chevalier, Palmes Academiques, by the French government, and in 1996, the promotion to Officier, Palmes Academiques. He holds honorary doctorates from European and Far Eastern Universities, several visiting professorships, distinguished lectureships, fellowships and other honours around the world.

Professor Constantinides presently has served as a member of the board of governors of the IEEE Signal Processing Society, a member of several technical committees of the IEEE and the IEE, and is on the editorial boards of professional journals.

He is a Fellow of the Institute of Electrical and Electronics Engineers (USA) and of the Institution of Electrical Engineers (UK). He received IEEE Leon K. Kirchmayer Graduate Teaching Award in 2012.

== Awards ==
- IEEE Leon K. Kirchmayer Graduate Teaching Award, 2012
- IET Achievement Medal, 2006
- The Blumlein-Brown-Willains Premium, The Institution of Electrical Engineers, UK, 1997
- Officier dans l’Ordre Palmes Academiques, from the French Government, 1996
- The Hartree Premium, The Institution of Electrical Engineers, UK, 1996
- Honorary Professor, University College, Institute of Archaeology, 1995
- Doctorate, Honoris Causa, National Technical University of Athens, Greece
- Gledden Distinguished Fellow, University of Western Australia, 1985
- Chevalier dans l'Ordre Palmes Academiques from the French Government, 1985
- Fellow at Royal Academy of Engineering, 2010
