= Tierney baronets =

Extinct baronetcy in the Baronetage of the United Kingdom

The Tierney Baronetcy, of Brighthelmstone in the County of Sussex and of Dover Street in the County of Middlesex, was a title that was created twice in the Baronetage of the United Kingdom, both times in favour of Matthew John Tierney, Physician-in-Ordinary to George III and George IV. The first creation came on 3 October 1818, with normal remainder to the heirs male of his body. The second creation came on 5 May 1834, with remainder in default of male issue of his own to his younger brother Edward Tierney, Dublin, then crown solicitor for Ireland, and the heirs male of his body. The 1818 creation became extinct on Tierney's death in 1845 while he was succeeded in the 1834 creation according to the special remainder by his brother, the second Baronet.

The 1834 creation became extinct on the death of the third Baronet in 1860.

Escutcheon of the Tierney baronets of Brighthelmstone and of Dover Street

== Tierney baronets, of Brighthelmstone and of Dover Street (1818; First creation) ==
- Sir Matthew John Tierney, 1st Baronet (1776–1845)

== Tierney baronets, of Brighthelmstone and of Dover Street (1834; Second creation) ==
- Sir Matthew John Tierney, 1st Baronet (1776–1845)
- Sir Edward Tierney, 2nd Baronet (1780–1856), received £6,459 in compensation during the abolition of slavery, for 357 slaves on St Kitts.
- Sir Matthew Edward Tierney, 3rd Baronet (1818–1860)

Baronetage of the United Kingdom
Preceded by Powell baronets	Tierney baronets of Brighthelmstone and of Dover Street; 3 October 1818	Succeeded by Davy baronets
Preceded by Bayley baronets	Tierney baronets of Brighthelmstone and of Dover Street; 5 May 1834	Succeeded by Hawkins-Whitshed baronets
