= Schröder family =

Hanseatic family of Hamburg

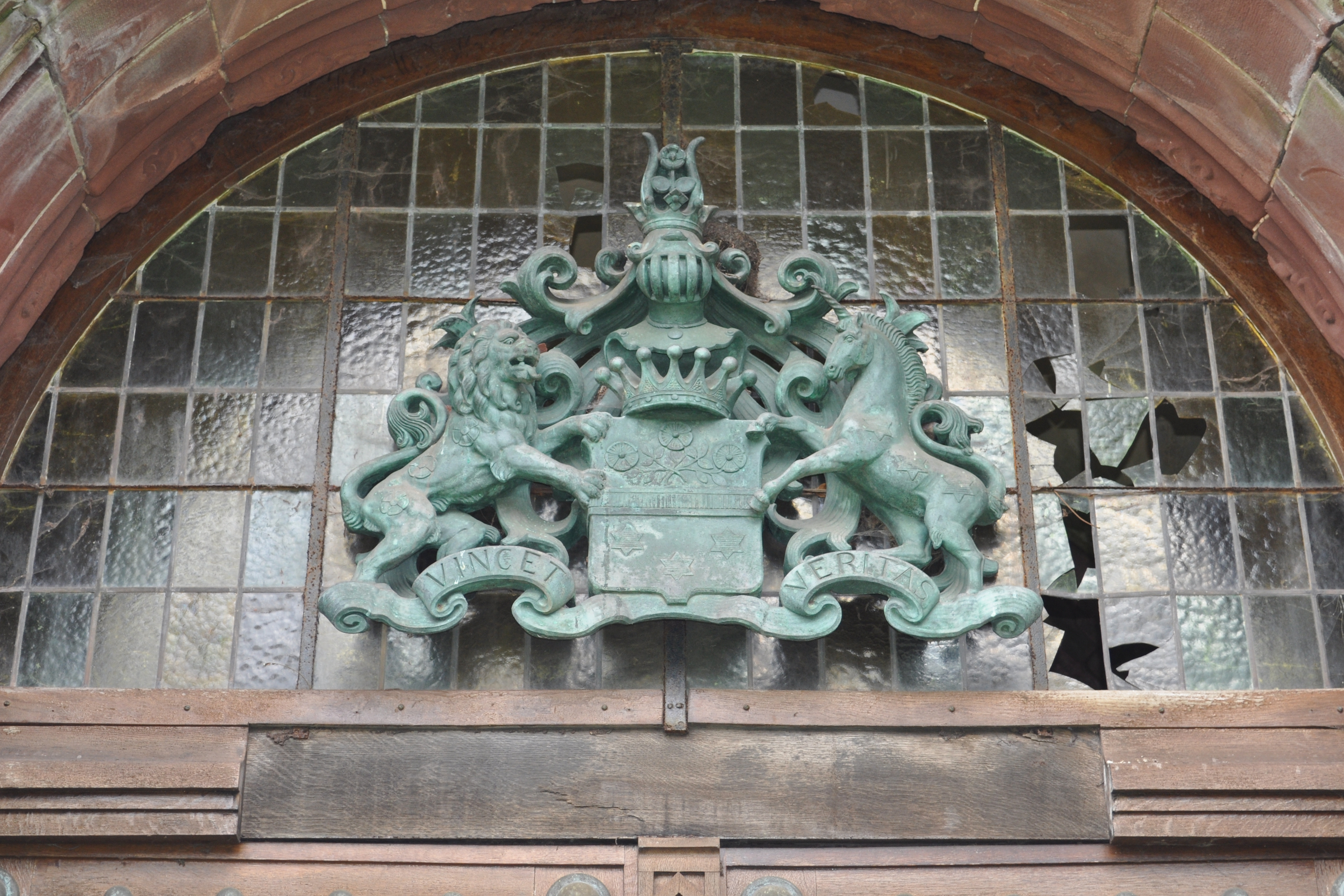
Coat of arms of the Schröder family

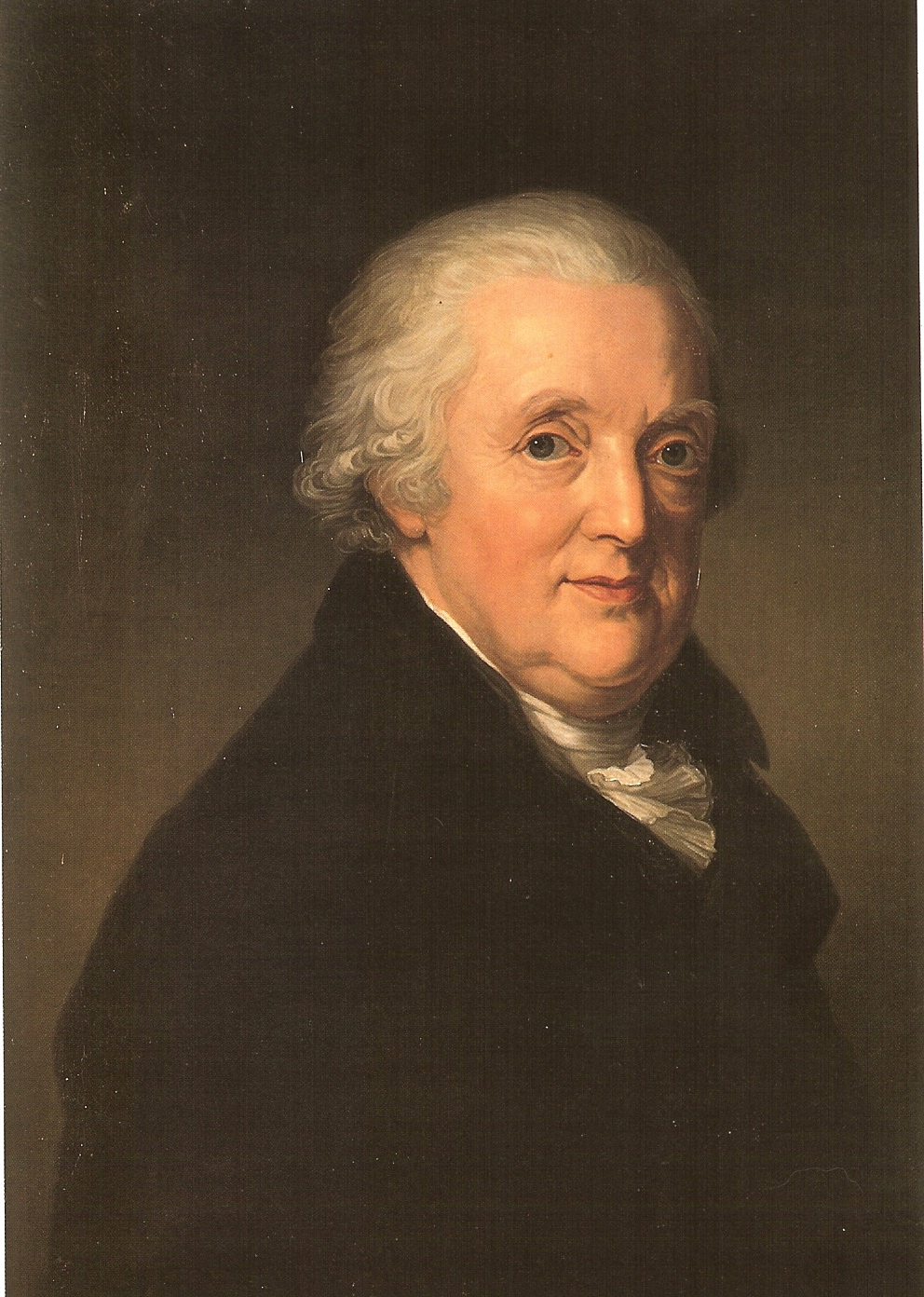
Christian Matthias Schröder (1742–1821)

The Schröder family is a Hanseatic family of Hamburg, that is, a family that belonged to the historical ruling class of grand burghers (also known more broadly in English as patricians) of the city republic prior to the constitutional changes in 1918–19. The Schröder family has traditionally been Lutheran.

== Notable members ==
Christian Matthias Schröder (1742–1821), a native of Quakenbrück, became a Hamburg merchant and acquired the hereditary grand burghership. He founded the well-known firm Christ. Matthias Schröder & Co., with branches in Bremen, Amsterdam, London, St. Petersburg and Riga. He was elected a senator in 1799 and served as the First Mayor of Hamburg, i.e. head of state and head of government of the sovereign city republic, from 1816 until his death in 1821. He was married to Luise Mutzenbecher (1754–1813), a member of a prominent Hamburg family.

They were the parents of Christian Mathias Schröder (1778–1860), who succeeded him as head of the firm and also became a Hamburg senator (1821–1859), and of Johann Heinrich Schröder, who settled in London and founded the investment bank Schroders. In 1868, Johann Heinrich Schröder was ennobled by Prussia and received the title of Freiherr (Baron).

Christian Matthias Schröder was the grandfather of Hamburg First Mayor Carl August Schröder. The firm Christ. Matthias Schröder & Co. went bankrupt in 1858.

Bruno Schroder was a non-executive director of Schroders and a member of the company's nominations committee.
