= Ancaster House, Richmond =

Historic home in Richmond, London

Ancaster House
- Interactive map of the Ancaster House area

General information
- Location: Richmond, London, England
- Coordinates: 51.4505°N 0.2961°W
- Completed: c. 1772

Design and construction
- Architect: Robert Adam

Listed Building – Grade II
- Official name: Ancaster House Star and Garter Nurses' Home
- Designated: 10 January 1950
- Reference no.: 1250038

Ancaster House is a Grade II listed building in Richmond, London. It sits by Richmond Gate and opposite the former Royal Star and Garter Home, which used the building to house its nurses.

== History ==
The house was built in the late 18th century for Peregrine Bertie, 3rd Duke of Ancaster as a country retreat from the Duke's home in London or, possibly, for use as a shooting box as it sits next to Richmond Park which was historically used for deer hunting. It was built on Crown land granted to him in gratitude for his military service. The building's design has been attributed to Robert Adam.

The house was later sold to Sir Lionel Darrell, a friend of George III. According to The London Encyclopaedia:

Sir Lionel needed extra land to build greenhouses and applied for permission to build on Park land. After interminable bureaucratic delays, he mentioned the problem to George III who was riding in the Park. The king dismounted, marked out a plot of land with a stick and within a short time the land was Sir Lionel’s.

Under Darrell's ownership the house gained a reputation of hosting extravagant parties. Upon Lionel Darrell's death in 1803, his daughter Amelia took ownership of the house and is said to have left her father's room as it was until 1864, when after her death it was reopened.

At some point it was used as a school and by 1915 it came into the ownership of the Star and Garter Home and began being used to house its nurses. A few years before this it had been set to be demolished and again in 1944 after suffering bomb damage but was saved both times. In 2013, it was sold along with the Star and Garter Home for redevelopment by London Square, and refurbished as three mansions, alongside other new buildings on the site.
