= Kynaston baronets =

Extinct baronetcy in the Baronetage of the United Kingdom

- Escutcheon of the Kynaston baronets of Hardwick and Worthen
- Creation date: 1818
- Status: extinct
- Extinction date: 1866

The Kynaston Baronetcy, of Hardwick and of Worthen in the County of Shropshire, was a title in the Baronetage of the United Kingdom. It was created on 3 October 1818 for John Kynaston Powell, of Hardwick, Shropshire, with remainder in failure of male issue of his own to his brother Edward Kynaston and the male issue of his body. He was born John Kynaston at Hordley, Shropshire, a descendant of the 12th century Barons of Powys, whose family settled in Shropshire in the 14th century. He was Member of Parliament for Shropshire 1784–1822. He changed his name in 1797 on inheriting an estate at Worthen from a maternal relative. He was succeeded according to the special remainder by his brother, the second Baronet.

== Kynaston baronets, of Hardwick and Worthen (1818) ==
- Sir John Kynaston Powell, 1st Baronet (1753–1822)
- Sir Edward Kynaston, 2nd Baronet (1758–1839)
- Sir John Roger Kynaston, 3rd Baronet (1797–1866) The title became extinct on his death in 1866.

== Extended family ==
- Francis Kynaston (1587–1642), courtier, poet and scholar
- Sir Roger Kynaston, Kt (1433–1495), High Sheriff of Shropshire knighted after the Battle of Tewkesbury during the War of the Roses
- Humphrey Kynaston (1468–1534), an outlaw in 1491
- Edward Kynaston, (1643–1699), Member of Parliament for Shropshire 1685–98
- John Kynaston, (1664–1733), Member of Parliament for Shropshire 1710–15 and 1722–27

Baronetage of the United Kingdom
Preceded by Campbell baronets	Kynaston baronets of Hardwick and Worthen; 3 October 1818	Succeeded by Tierney baronets
