= Fretherne =

Village in Gloucestershire, England

Coordinates: 51.7807°N 2.3874°W

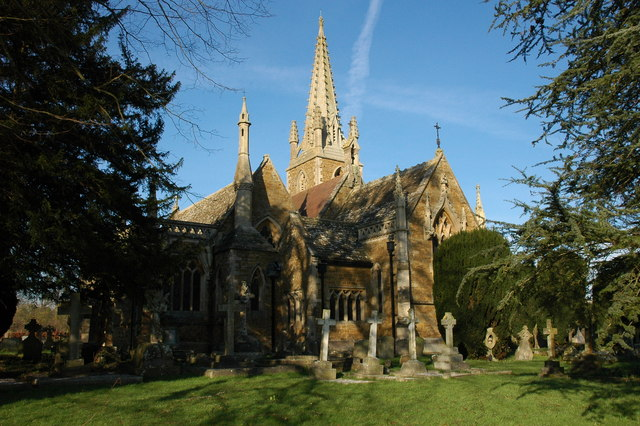
- Fretherne Church

- Location within Gloucestershire
- OS grid reference: SO7309
- Civil parish: Fretherne with Saul
- District: Stroud
- Shire county: Gloucestershire
- Region: South West
- Country: England
- Sovereign state: United Kingdom
- Post town: Gloucester
- Postcode district: GL2
- Dialling code: 01452
- Police: Gloucestershire
- Fire: Gloucestershire
- Ambulance: South Western
- UK Parliament: Stroud

Fretherne is a small village and former civil parish, now in the parish of Fretherne with Saul, in the Stroud district, in Gloucestershire, England, situated between the larger villages of Frampton-on-Severn and Arlingham. In 1881 the parish had a population of 239. In the Domesday Book of 1086 it is recorded as held by Turstin FitzRolf. The village name probably originates from Old English 'Frithorne,' meaning 'Freo's thorn.'

A public footpath 50 metres west of the church leads to Hock Cliff at the River Severn (at its widest pre-estuary point), which is popular with fossil hunters.

On 24 March 1884 the parish was abolished to form "Fretherne with Saul".

== See also ==
- Fretherne Court
