= Sir Edward Tierney, 2nd Baronet =

Irish attorney and baronet

Escutcheon of the Tierney baronets

Sir Edward Tierney, 2nd Baronet (June 1780 – 11 May 1856) was an Irish lawyer and landowner.

== Early life ==
Tierney was born in Limerick City, Ireland, in June 1780. He was the third son of John Tierney of Ballyscandlend and Mary (née Gleeson) Tierney. His eldest brother, Matthew John Tierney, married Harriet Mary Jones (a daughter of Henry Jones, Esq.), and his second brother, Thomas Tierney, served as paymaster to the 43rd Regiment of Foot. His two surviving sisters were Frances Tierney (wife of Matthew McMahon of Limerick) and Sarah Tierney (wife of Henry Bowles of Limerick).

His maternal grandfather was James Gleeson of Rathkennan, County Limerick.

== Career ==
Tierney apprenticed with a solicitor in Limerick before being admitted to King's Inns in 1798 and being called to the bar in c. 1806. Eventually he served as one of the Crown Solicitor for Ireland for the North-West Circuit, and served as agent and legal adviser to Henry Perceval, 5th Earl of Egmont. (Note: Tierney was made sole executor and residuary legatee of the estate of Henry Perceval, 5th Earl of Egmont, who died in 1841. The wills of the 4th and 5th Earls were not proven until 1857, after Tierney's death, by his son-in-law Sir William Darell. The 5th Earl's will was rather belatedly contested by the 6th Earl in 1863, on the grounds that Tierney had taken advantage of the 5th Earl's drunkenness to provide a misleading valuation of the estates which influenced the drafting of the will. The 6th Earl ultimately settled out of court with Darell, paying £125,000 for the return of the Irish estates; Tierney and his heirs had realised an estimated £300,000 for their stewardship.) Through his wife's inheritance, he received £6,459 in compensation during the abolition of slavery, for 357 slaves on St Kitts.

In 1845, he succeeded to the Tierney baronetcy, of Brighthelmstone and of Dover Street, which had been created in the Baronetage of the United Kingdom on 5 May 1834 for his elder brother, Matthew John Tierney, Physician-in-Ordinary to George III and George IV. The baronetcy was created with remainder, in default of male issue of his brother, to his Edward, then crown solicitor for Ireland, and the heirs male of his body. His elder brother's 1818 creation became extinct on his death in 1845 while Edward succeeded in the 1834 creation.

== Personal life ==
In April 1812, Tierney was married to Anna Maria Jones at St George's, Hanover Square. The youngest daughter of Henry Jones, Esq. of Bloomsbury Square, London, her elder sister, Harriet, was married to Edward's brother, Matthew. Their only surviving brother, the Rev. Inigo William Jones, owned Albrighton Hall, Shrewsbury. Together, they lived at Fitzwilliam Street in Dublin, and were the parents of:

- John Perceval Tierney (1813–1817), who died young.
- Harriet Mary Tierney (1816–1873), who married the Rev. Sir William Darell, 4th Baronet, grandson of Sir Lionel Darell, 1st Baronet, in 1843.
- Sir Matthew Edward Tierney, 3rd Baronet (1818–1860), who married Mary Spurgeon, a daughter of Farrer Grove Spurgeon-Farrer of Brayfield House, Cold Brayfield, and Mary Leslie Anstruther, in 1855.

Sir Edward died on 11 May 1856 in Dublin, and was succeeded in the baronetcy by his eldest surviving son, Matthew. Upon his death, he the Egmont estates to his son-in-law, the Rev. Sir William Darell, 4th Baronet.

Baronetage of the United Kingdom
Preceded by Matthew John Tierney	Tierney baronets of Brighthelmstone and of Dover Street; 1845–1856	Succeeded by Matthew Edward Tierney
