= Schroders =

British asset management company

Schroders Limited

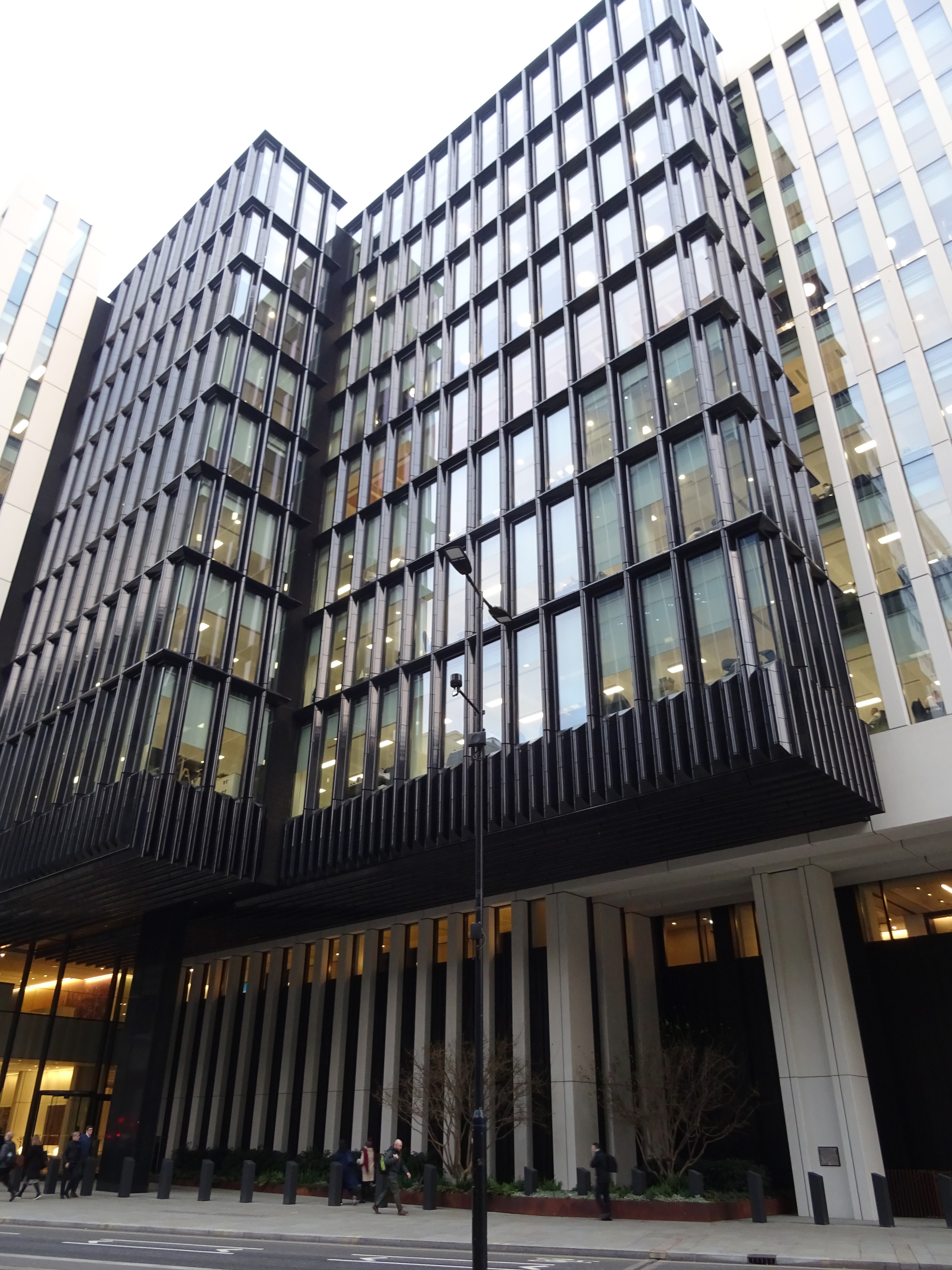
- Headquarters at 1 London Wall Place
- Type: Private limited company
- Traded as: LSE: SDR; LSE: SDRC
- Industry: Investment management
- Founded: 1804; 222 years ago
- Founder: Johann Heinrich Schröder
- Headquarters: London, England, UK
- Key people: Matthew Westerman (chair); Richard Oldfield (CEO)
- Products: Asset management; Risk management; Mutual funds; Exchange-traded funds; Index funds; Stockbroking
- Revenue: ▲£3,250.7 million (2025)
- Operating income: ▲£673.9 million (2025)
- Net income: ▲£550.4 million (2025)
- AUM: ▲£823.7 billion (2025)
- Number of employees: 6,194 (2025)
- Subsidiaries: Cazenove, Asia Pacific Land Limited, Blue Asset Management, Schroder & Co Bank AG, Sandaire Investment Office, Schroders Capital
- Website: www.schroders.com

Schroders Limited is a British multinational asset management company headquartered in London, England. Founded in 1804, it employs over 6,000 people worldwide in 38 locations around Europe, America, Asia, Africa and the Middle East. It was traded on the London Stock Exchange and was a constituent of the FTSE 100 Index until it was acquired by Nuveen in September 2026. It is the 21st largest asset management firm in the world.

Schroders bears the name of the Schröder family, a Hanseatic family of Hamburg with branches in other countries. The Schroder family, through trustee companies, individual ownership and charities, held 44 per cent of the company's ordinary shares, before it was acquired.

== History ==
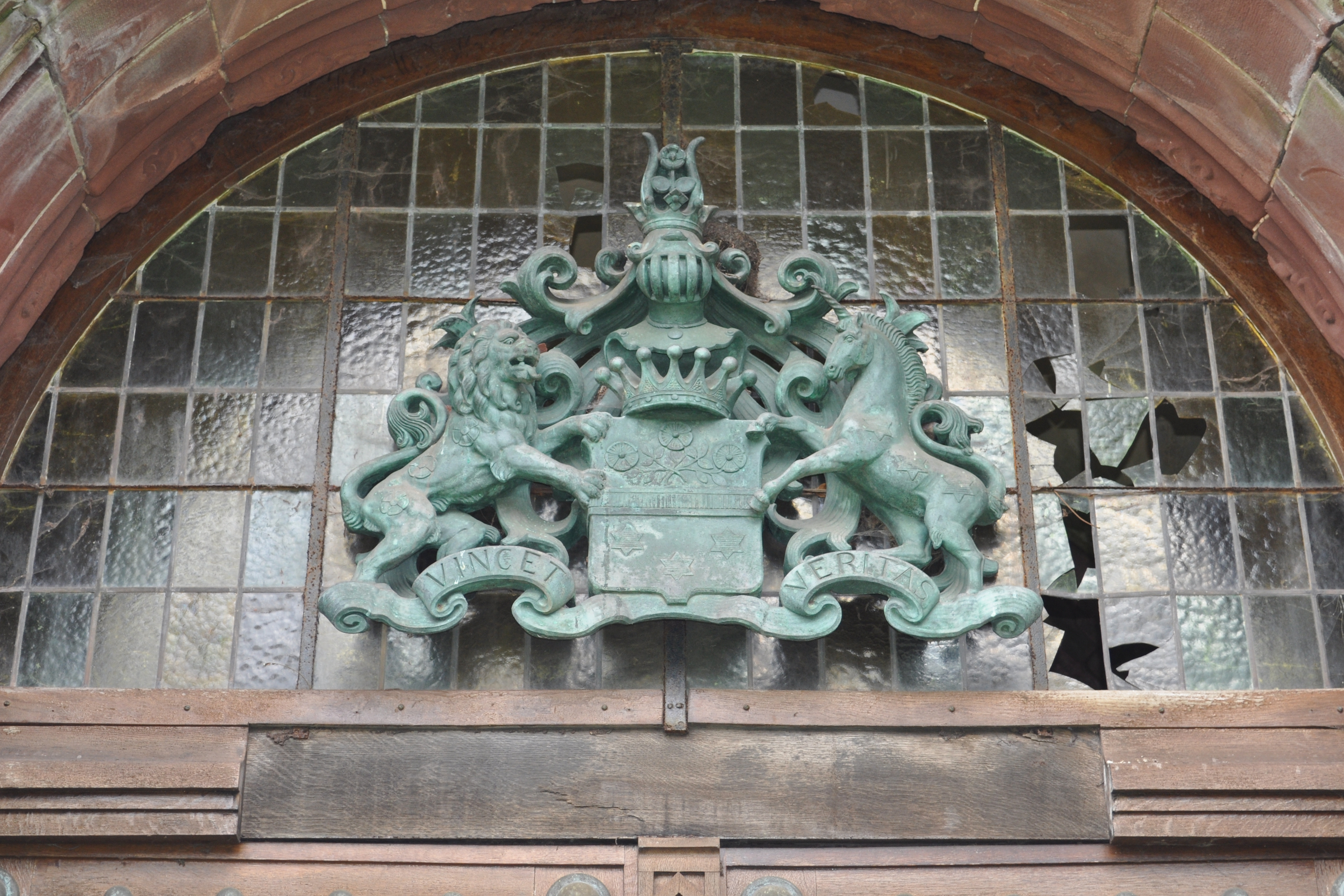
Arms of the family

Schroders' history began in 1804 when Johann Heinrich Schröder (John Henry) became a partner in J.F. Schröder & Co, the London-based firm of his brother, Johann Friedrich (John Frederick), founded in 1800. In 1818 J. Henry Schröder & Co. was established in London.

During the American Civil War, Schroders "issued £3m bonds in 1863 for the Confederacy".

Key events in the development of the business include the establishment of J. Henry Schroder Banking Corporation ('Schrobanco') as a commercial bank in New York in 1923.

Further key events included the public offering of the shares in J. Henry Schroder & Co. Ltd on the London Stock Exchange in 1959 and the acquisition of Helbert, Wagg & Co, a leading issuing house, in 1962.

In 1986 the company disposed of Schrobanco, its commercial banking arm in New York and acquired 50% of Wertheim & Co., a mid-tier New York based investment bank, whose activities more closely mirrored those of the London business. Schroders played a leading role in the privatisations carried out by the UK government in the 1980s and was to grow dramatically under Winfried Bischoff. Schroders was worth £30 million when he took over as CEO in 1984; in 2000 the company sold its investment banking division to Citigroup for £1.3 billion. Citigroup's European investment banking arm traded as Schroder Salomon Smith Barney from 2000 to 2003.

In April 2012, Schroders acquired a 25% stake in Axis Mutual Fund.

In 2013, Schroders purchased the capital management arm of Cazenove in a deal worth £424 million.

Schroders bought the London-based Sandaire Investment Office in September 2020.

Schroders announced in June 2021 that it was uniting its specialist private assets capabilities under the newly launched Schroders Capital brand.

In December 2021, the firm signed up to the UN's Women Empowerment Principles, an initiative to support women in the workplace which was founded by the United Nations Global Compact and UN Women.

In 2023, Schroders announced that Chris Durack and Karine Szenberg were appointed co-heads to its client groups in an internal restructuring effort to drive growth across the Asia-Pacific area.

In September 2024, Schroders named finance chief Richard Oldfield as the new CEO, succeeding Peter Harrison, effective 8 November 2024.

In November 2024, Schroders announced that they were reducing the size of its executive committee to 9 members from 22. As part of the overhaul, Ed Houghton, who was most recently a director at Legal & General Group Plc, would join Schroders and its management committee as head of strategy and investor engagement.

In February 2026, US asset manager Nuveen agreed to acquire Schroders at a share price of 612p, valuing the company at £9.9 billion. On 29 September 2026, the inquiry was approved by the court, allowing the transaction to be completed.

On 30 September 2026, it was announced that the acquisition had been finalised.

== Collaboration with universities ==
In June 2014, Schroders' Multi-Asset Investments and Portfolio Solutions (MAPS) announced a collaboration with Professor Anthony G. Constantinides, Director of the newly created Imperial College Financial signal processing Laboratory (FSP).

== Notable current and former employees ==
=== Business ===
- Geoffrey Bell – chairman of Guinness Mahon (1987–1993) and founder of the Group of Thirty
- Winfried Bischoff – chairman of Lloyds Banking Group (2009–2014)
- Andrew Knight – editor of The Economist (1974–1986)
- Huw van Steenis – vice chair of Oliver Wyman

=== Politics and public service ===
- David Ogilvy, 13th Earl of Airlie – Lord Chamberlain (1984–1997)
- Sir Gordon Richardson – governor of the Bank of England (1973–1983)
- James Wolfensohn – president of the World Bank (1995–2005)
- Sir John Henry Bremridge KBE, JP, MA – financial secretary of Hong Kong (1981–1986). Sir John Henry Bremridge served as a non-executive director of Schroders plc.

=== Other ===
- Avery Rockefeller – member of the Rockefeller family
- Frank Cyril Tiarks – director of the Bank of England (1912–1945); and High Sheriff of Kent (1927)
