= Darell baronets =

Escutcheon of Sir John Darell, 1st Baronet, of West Woodhay

There have been two baronetcies created for persons with the surname Darell, one in the Baronetage of England and one in the Baronetage of Great Britain. As of 2026 one creation is extant.

- Darell baronets of West Woodhay (1622): see Sir John Darell, 1st Baronet (died c. 1657)
- Darell baronets of Richmond Hill (1795)
