= List of British monarchy records =

The following is a list of various statistical records relating to the monarchy of the United Kingdom and its predecessors and constituents.

== Summary ==
| Record name | Highest record | Holder(s) | Lowest record | Holder(s) |
|---|---|---|---|---|
| Length of reign | 25,782 days (70 years) | Elizabeth II | 9 days | Lady Jane Grey |
| Longevity | 35,204 days (96 years) | Elizabeth II | 2,727 days (7 years) | Margaret of Norway |
| Longevity as heir apparent | 25,782 days (70 years) | Charles III | 52 days | Henry of Surrey |
| Longevity as heir presumptive | 5,536 days (15 years) | Elizabeth II | ~77 days | Richard of Shrewsbury |
| Age at accession | 26,961 days (73 years) | Charles III | 6 days | Mary, Queen of Scots |
| Age difference between successive monarchs | 19,940 days (54 years) | George II and George III | 539 days | Edward VIII and George VI |
| Age at marriage | 22,000 days (60 years) | Edward I | 1,595 days (4 years) | David II |
| Consort's age at marriage | 21,086 days (57 years) | Queen Camilla | 2,640 days (7 years) | Isabella of Valois |
| Length of marriage | 26,896 days (73 years) | Elizabeth II and Prince Philip | 143 days | Alexander III and Yolande of Dreux |
| Number of marriages | 6 | Henry VIII | 0 | Æthelstan, Eadred, Edward the Martyr, Canute II, William II, Edward Balliol, Edward V, Edward VI, Elizabeth I |
| Number of children | 29 | Henry I of England | 0 | Æthelstan, Eadred, Eadwig, Edward the Martyr, Canute II, Edward the Confessor, William II, Edward Balliol, Richard II, Edward V, Edward VI, Lady Jane Grey, Mary I, Elizabeth I, William III, Mary II and Edward VIII |
| Number of legitimate children | 19 | Edward I of England | 0 | (in addition to those listed immediately above who had no children at all): Richard I, and Charles II |
| Age of parent | 66 years | Edward I of England | 17 years | Edward III of England |
| Height | 1.94 m | Edward IV | 1.52 m | Victoria |

== Reign of British monarchs ==
=== Longest ===
The longest reign of a British monarch is that of Elizabeth II (70 years, 214 days) between 6 February 1952 and 8 September 2022. The second-longest reign is the 63 years 216 days of Queen Victoria between 1837 and 1901. Queen Elizabeth II's reign became longer than Queen Victoria's on 9 September 2015. The third-longest reign (and longest of a king) was that of George III, who reigned for 59 years 96 days between 1760 and 1820.

James Stuart, the Old Pretender, was a pretender to the throne from 16 September 1701 until his death on 1 January 1766, a total of 64 years 108 days.

Prince Philip, Duke of Edinburgh, was the monarch's spouse from 6 February 1952 until his death on 9 April 2021, for a total of 69 years 62 days, making him the longest-serving consort overall. The queen consort with the longest tenure was Charlotte of Mecklenburg-Strelitz, who was George III's consort for 57 years, 70 days, between 1761 and 1818.

Charles III was the longest serving heir-apparent, Duke of Cornwall, and Duke of Rothesay, with a tenure of 70 years 214 days from 6 February 1952, and Prince of Wales, with a tenure of 64 years and 44 days from 26 July 1958 until ascending the throne on 8 September 2022.

Anne was the only heiress apparent in British history so she holds the record as the longest and shortest serving heiress apparent, with a tenure of 7 years and 70 days.

Margaret of Scotland, Countess of Kent was heir presumptive to William I of Scotland, Alexander II and Alexander III for a total of about 43 years, 14 days (her tenure as heir presumptive to Alexander II was also the longest single tenure at 26 years, 274 days). The longest-serving heir-presumptive of either sex was Robert II, who was heir-presumptive to Robert I and then David II for a total of 46 years, 353 days; he also served the longest single tenure (41 years, 260 days as heir-presumptive to David II).

Edward the Black Prince had the longest tenure as an heir who did not subsequently become monarch; he was heir apparent to Edward III for his lifetime of 45 years 357 days, but he died in 1376, one year before his father, who died in 1377.

=== Shortest ===
The shortest-reigning monarch was Lady Jane Grey who ruled for 9 days from 6 July until 15 July 1553 (although she was only proclaimed queen by the Lords of the council on 10 July). Her husband Lord Guildford Dudley was her consort for the entire reign, making this the shortest tenure of the male consort of a female monarch. Note: Jane's reign is disputed.

The king with the shortest definitively known reign was Edgar the Ætheling who ruled for 2 months, 12 days in 1066 before submitting to William the Conqueror. Some records indicate that Sweyn Forkbeard reigned for only 40 days in 1013–4.

The queen consort with the shortest tenure was Yolande de Dreux, second wife of Alexander III, who was queen for 154 days in 1285 and 1286.

The shortest tenure as heir apparent was that of the unnamed son of Henry VIII who died within hours of birth on 7 September 1513.

Elizabeth I holds the records for the shortest tenure of an English heir presumptive (almost 2 years as heir-presumptive to Henry VIII) unless one recognizes the 13-day tenure attributed to Lady Jane Grey's sister, The Lady Herbert of Cardiff. This would also be the record for shortest total tenure as heir-presumptive (Elizabeth was later heiress-presumptive to her sister Mary).

The shortest total tenure as a male heir-presumptive was George I (54 days).

The shortest tenure as a female heir presumptive Mary, Queen of Scots who was heir presumptive from birth until her accession to the throne at the age of 6 days.

=== Pretenders in power ===
During the Middle Ages and the mid-18th century, a number of pretenders to the throne controlled all or a substantial portion of England and Scotland:

- Empress Matilda: Daughter and only surviving child of Henry I of England, was declared her father's heir, but her cousin Stephen usurped the throne. This led to a years long war, in which her son Henry II, was eventually declared Stephen's heir. This period is known as the Anarchy.
- Henry the Young King, who was crowned junior king in 1170 at the age of 15, led a revolt against his father Henry II for several months in 1173–74 and controlled much of England.
- Louis VIII of France: Controlled the Southeast of England and later the whole country briefly during the First Barons' War from 1215 to 1217.
- Edward Balliol was crowned king of Scotland in 1332 and was able to control some parts of it until 1356. His claim was recognized and supported by England.
- James III and VIII sent his son Bonnie Prince Charlie to reclaim his kingdom and the latter controlled Scotland and Northern England for several months in 1745.

== Longevity ==
=== Monarchs ===
==== Longest-lived ====
The longest-lived British monarch and ruler was Queen Elizabeth II, who was aged 96 years, 140 days, having surpassed her great-great-grandmother Queen Victoria on 21 December 2007, who had held the record since 18 January 1901, surpassing her own grandfather George III—just four days before her own death on 22 January 1901.

The longest-lived male consort was her husband, Prince Philip, Duke of Edinburgh, who died at the age of 99 years 303 days old on 9 April 2021.

The longest-lived king was Edward Balliol of Scotland, who died at age 83 or 84 in 1367. Note: Edward Balliol's reign is disputed.

The longest-lived undisputed king was George III, who died at the age of 81 years, 239 days in 1820.

The longest-lived male ruler was Richard Cromwell who ruled as Lord Protector (1658–1659) who lived until the age of 85 years, 282 days.

The longest-lived queen consort and overall consort was Lady Elizabeth Bowes-Lyon, later known as the Queen Mother, consort to George VI, and mother of the longest-lived British monarch, who was 101 years 238 days at the time of her death on 30 March 2002.

==== Shortest-lived ====
The youngest Scottish monarch to die was Margaret, Maid of Norway, who died at the age of 7 years, five months, and 18 days in 1290.

The youngest English monarch to die was Edward V, who was most likely murdered after he was deposed, when he was 12 years, 10 months.

=== Heirs apparent ===
Charles, Prince of Wales was the oldest heir apparent until his ascension when he was 73 years 298 days old. Charles III was also the longest-serving heir apparent, for the whole 70 years 214 days of his mother's reign. The second-longest serving was Edward VII, from his birth until his ascension at the age of 59 years 74 days. Charles surpassed Edward to become the longest-serving heir on 20 April 2011, the day before his mother's 85th birthday.

Prince William, Duke of Cambridge, was the oldest heir apparent to an heir apparent until his father's ascension when he was 40 years 79 days old.

Prince George of Cambridge was the oldest heir apparent to an heir apparent to an heir apparent until his grandfather's ascension when he was 9 years 48 days old.

=== Heirs presumptive ===
The oldest ever heir presumptive was Sophia of Hanover, who lived from 14 October 1630 to 8 June 1714 (83 years 237 days). As a result of the Act of Settlement 1701, she became heir presumptive on the accession of Queen Anne in 1702. She died about two months prior to Queen Anne's own death, and then Sophia's son became George I.

The oldest male heir presumptive was Ernest Augustus, King of Hanover and Duke of Cumberland, who was displaced as Queen Victoria's heir in 1840 by the birth of his great-niece Victoria, Princess Royal, when he was aged 69 years, 169 days.

== Age of accession ==
=== Oldest ===
The oldest monarch at the start of his reign was Charles III aged 73 years, 298 days when he became king in 2022. Prior to this, William IV had held this record since 1830, becoming king aged 64 years, 308 days.

The oldest female monarch at the time of her accession was Mary I, aged 37 years, 151 days when she became queen in 1553.

The oldest queen consort was Camilla, wife of Charles III, who was aged 75 years, 53 days when she became queen consort in 2022.

=== Youngest ===
The youngest British monarch at the start of her reign was Mary, Queen of Scots, who became queen aged 6 days in 1542. The youngest king was Henry VI, who was 8 months and 26 days old at the time of his accession.

The youngest queen consort was Isabella of Valois, second wife of Richard II, aged 6 years 11 months and 25 days when she became queen consort in 1396.

== Age differences, outgoing and succeeding monarchs ==
=== Greatest ===
The greatest age difference of an outgoing British monarch and successor was 54 years and 217 days between George II (born 30 October 1683) and his grandson George III (born 4 June 1738) who succeeded on the former's death on 25 October 1760.

=== Smallest ===
The smallest age difference of an outgoing British monarch and successor was 1 year and 171 days between Edward VIII (born 23 June 1894) and his brother George VI (born 14 December 1895) who succeeded on the former's abdication on 11 December 1936.

== Marriage ==
=== Most marriages ===
Henry VIII was married six times, making him Britain's most-married monarch. The queen who was married the most times was Mary, Queen of Scots, who had three husbands. The most-married queen consort was Catherine Parr, sixth wife of Henry VIII, who had four husbands.

=== Never married ===
William II, Edward V, Edward VI, and Elizabeth I all lived and died unmarried. In addition, Edward VIII was unmarried during his tenure as monarch, though he married Wallis Simpson after his abdication.

=== Youngest ===
The youngest monarch to marry was David II, who married Joan, daughter of Edward II when he was 4 years 134 days old in 1328.

The youngest female monarch at the time of her marriage was Mary II, who was 15 years, 188 days old when she married William III in 1677.

The youngest queen consort was Isabella of Valois, who married Richard II when she was 6 years, 358 days old in 1396.

=== Oldest ===
The oldest monarch at the time of his first marriage was William IV, who was 52 years, 324 days old when he married Adelaide of Saxe-Meiningen in 1818.

Mary I was the oldest queen at the time of her first marriage, aged 38 years, 157 days when she married Philip of Spain in 1554.

When second or subsequent marriages are included, the oldest monarch at the time of his marriage was Edward I, whose second marriage was to Margaret of France in 1299 when he was 60 years, 83 days old and she was no more than 20.

The oldest queen consort at the time of her marriage was Camilla, who married Charles III when she was 57 years old.

=== Longest ===
The longest marriage of a British sovereign was between Elizabeth II and Prince Philip, who were married from 20 November 1947 until Prince Philip's death on 9 April 2021, a total of 73 years and 139 days.

=== Shortest ===
The shortest marriage is between Alexander III of Scotland and Yolande of Dreux, who were married for 4 months and 19 days from 1285–1286 until the former's death.

== Children ==
=== Most ===
The British monarch with the most children was Henry I, who had 29 children (5 legitimate).

The British monarch with the most legitimate children was Edward I, who had 19 children with Eleanor of Castile and Margaret of France of whom 8 reached adulthood.

The queen regnant with the most children was Queen Victoria who had 9 children of whom all reached adulthood.

The queen regnant with the most pregnancies was Anne, who had 17, but only 5 resulted in live-born children (two of whom survived past the age of one, one reached the age of eleven, but all of them died before their mother).

=== Age of parents ===
The youngest King to father a child is Edward I, a stillborn child was born when he was 15, during his marriage to Eleanor of Castile, she was 13.

The youngest queen regnant to give birth is Mary II, who gave birth to a stillborn child in 1678, prior to her accession, when she was just 16.

The youngest mother to give birth to a monarch was Lady Margaret Beaufort, wife of Edmund Tudor, who was 13 years and almost 8 months when she gave birth to Henry VII in 1457.

The oldest king to become a father was Edward I, who fathered his last child, Eleanor, in 1306, when he was 66, almost 67 years old.

The youngest queen consort to become a mother was Eleanor of Castile, who gave birth to a stillborn girl, in 1255, when she was around 13.

The oldest queen consort to become a mother was Eleanor of Aquitaine, who gave birth to John, in 1166, when she was 43–44.

=== Posthumous births ===
Two British monarchs were posthumously born sons (of fathers who had died before their births):

- Henry VII, who was born on 28 January 1457, following the death of his father Edmund Tudor, 1st Earl of Richmond on 1 or 3 November 1456, between 87 or 89 days previously.
- William III, who was born on 14 November 1650, following the death of his father William II, Prince of Orange on 6 November 1650, 8 days previously.

James IV of Scotland, who died at the Battle of Flodden on 9 September 1513, left a posthumous son, Alexander Stewart, Duke of Ross, who was born on 30 April 1514, 7 months later.

== Physical attributes ==
=== Tallest ===
The tallest measured British monarch was Edward IV, whose skeleton measures 6 ft 4 1/2 in (1.94 m). Records indicate that when fully clad in armour he would have been about 6 ft 7 in (2.01 m).

The tallest queens were Mary, Queen of Scots and Mary II of England and Scotland, who were both 5 ft 11 in (1.80 m).

=== Shortest ===
The shortest British monarch in adulthood was Queen Victoria, who stood only 5 ft 0 in (1.52 m) when in her 30s, and was possibly an inch or two shorter towards the end of her life. The shortest king in adulthood whose height is documented was Charles I, who stood 5 ft 4 in (1.63 m).

== See also ==
- Lists of monarchs in the British Isles
- Records of Prime Ministers of the United Kingdom
