= Works based on Alice in Wonderland =

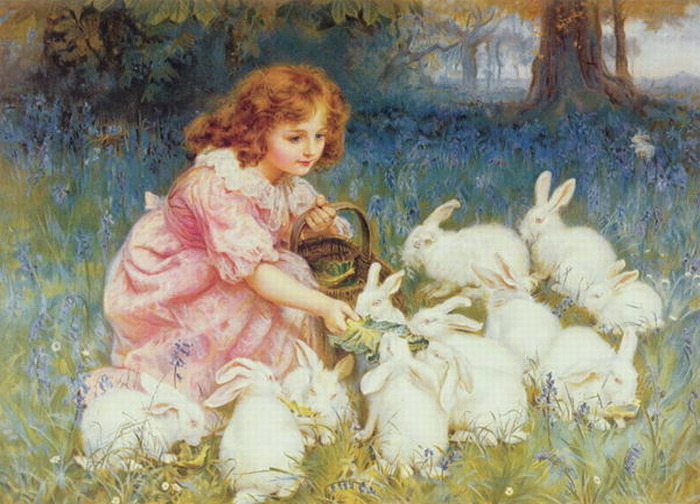
Feeding the Rabbits also known as Alice in Wonderland by Frederick Morgan (1856–1927)

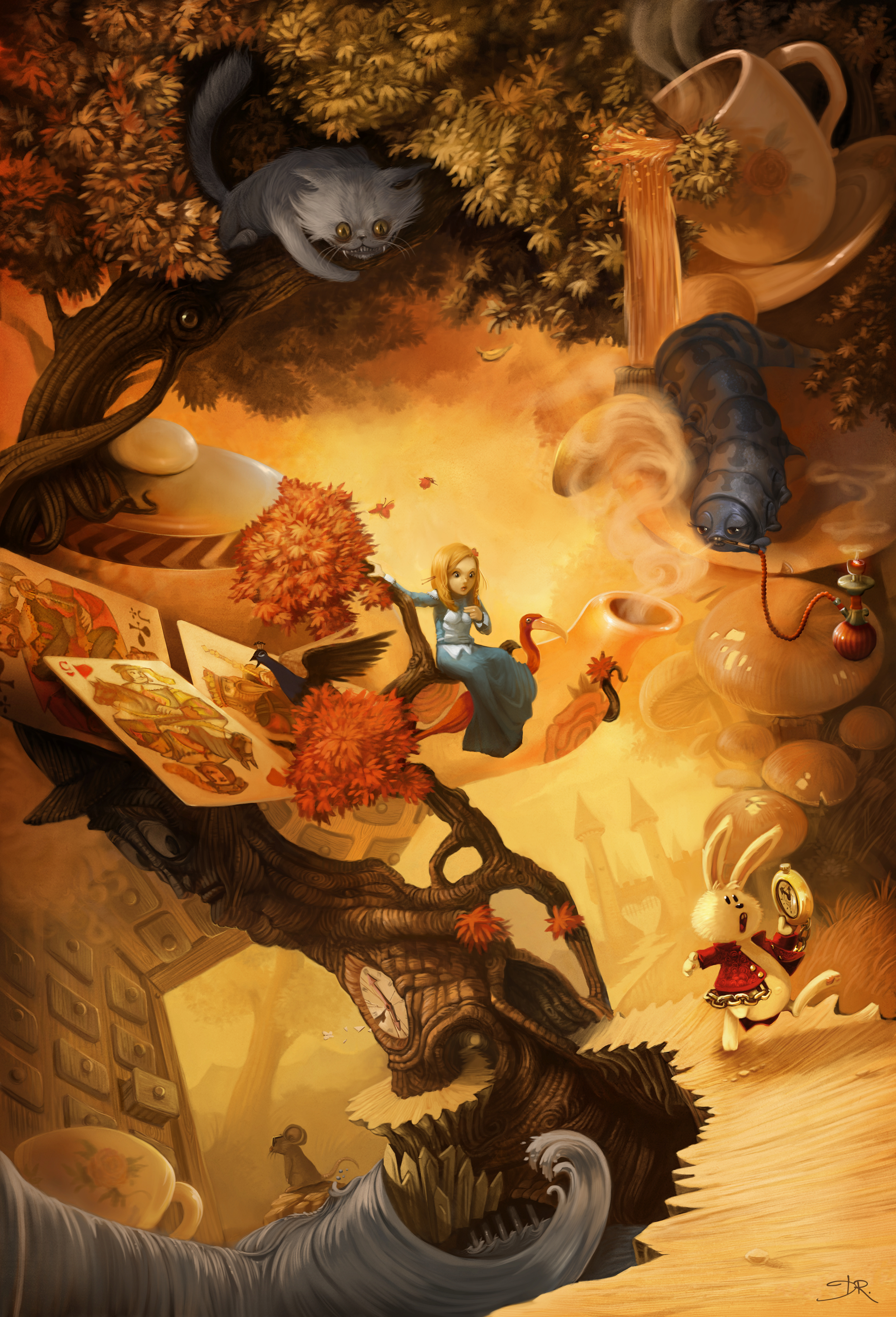
The public domain status of the novel Alice in Wonderland allows it and its characters to be freely remixed. In 2010, artist David Revoy received the CG Choice Award for his work "Alice in Wonderland".

Lewis Carroll's books Alice's Adventures in Wonderland (1865) and Through the Looking-Glass (1871) have been highly popular in their original forms, and have served as the basis for many subsequent works since they were published. They have been adapted directly into other media, their characters and situations have been appropriated into other works, and these elements have been referenced innumerable times as familiar elements of shared culture. Simple references to the two books are too numerous to list; this list of works based on Alice in Wonderland focuses on works based specifically and substantially on Carroll's two books about the character of Alice.

Carolyn Sigler has shown that Carroll's two great fantasies inspired dozens of imitations, responses, and parodies during the remainder of the nineteenth century and the first part of the twentieth — so many that Carroll at one point began his own collection of Alice imitations. In 1887, one critic even suggested that Carroll had plagiarized Tom Hood's From Nowhere to the North Pole (1875) when writing Alice — although Hood's work came out ten years after Alice and was one of its many imitations.

In 1907, copyright on Alice's Adventures in Wonderland expired in the UK, entering the tale into the public domain. The primary wave of Alice-inspired works slackened after about 1920, though Carroll's influence on other writers has never fully waned.

== Literature and publications ==
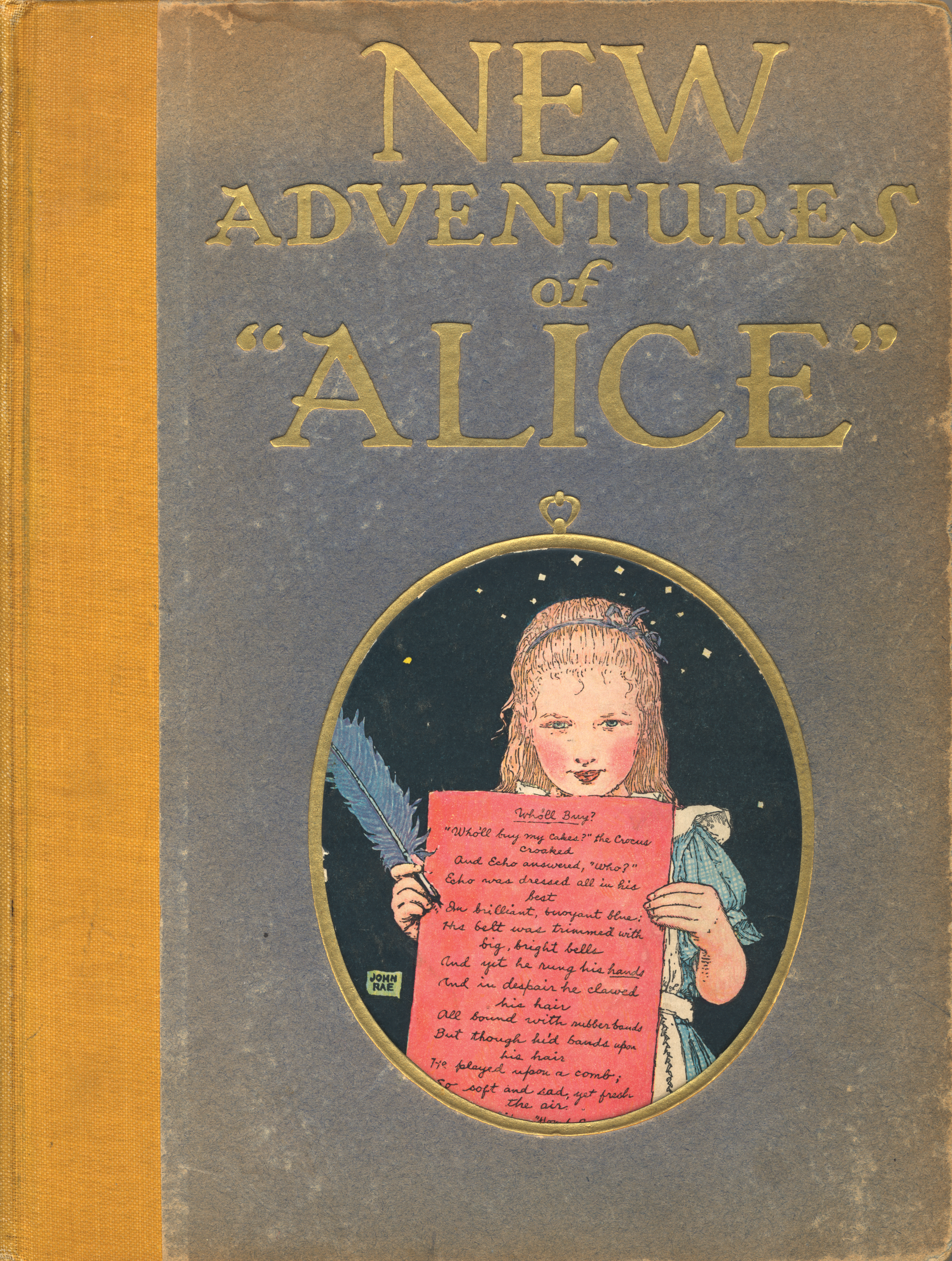
Book cover of New Adventures of Alice (1917)

=== Literary retellings and sequels ===
- 1890 – The Nursery "Alice" by Lewis Carroll himself, retelling the story for younger children.
- 1895 – A New Alice in the Old Wonderland by Anna M. Richards, a sequel in which a new Alice Lee travels to Wonderland to meet many of Carroll's characters, as well as others. (New ed. 2009, ISBN 978-1-904808-35-0)
- 1897 – Gladys in Grammarland by Audrey Mayhew Allen and illustrated by Henry Clarence Pitz, an educational work in which a recalcitrant schoolgirl meets many grammar Imps which help to educate her. (New ed. 2010, ISBN 978-1-904808-57-2)
- 1902 – The Westminster Alice by Saki and illustrated by Francis Carruthers Gould, parodying the Second Boer War in which Alice meets many British politicians of the time. (New ed. 2010, ISBN 978-1-904808-54-1)
- 1902 – Clara in Blunderland and the following Lost in Blunderland (1903) by Caroline Lewis, parodying the Second Boer War in which Clara represents the Leader of the House of Commons and later Prime Minister Arthur Balfour.
- 1904 – John Bull's Adventures in the Fiscal Wonderland by Charles Geake and Francis Carruthers Gould, parodying British economic policies of the time, in which John Bull plays the part of Alice. (New ed. 2010, ISBN 978-1-904808-51-0)
- 1905 – Alice's Adventures in Wonderland Retold in Words of One Syllable by J.C. Gorham, part of Burt's Series of One Syllable Books, retelling the story of Alice in words of one syllable.
- 1907 – Alice in Blunderland: An Iridescent Dream by John Kendrick Bangs, parodying big business and big government. (New ed. 2010, ISBN 978-1-904808-56-5)
- 1914 – Malice in Kulturland by Horace Wyatt, a satire of current events involving Prussia.
- 1917 – New Adventures of Alice by John Rae, a sequel in which a young girl called Betsy dreams of finding a new Alice in Wonderland book, and the adventures within. (New ed. 2010, ISBN 978-1-904808-53-4)
- 1923 – Alice in Grammarland by Louise Franklin Bache and illustrated by "Claudine", an educational work in which Alice attends a courtroom scene in Grammarland where questions of grammar are discussed. (New ed. 2010, ISBN 978-1-904808-57-2)
- 1925 – Alice in Orchestralia (or Alice in Orchestra-Land) and the following Marching Notes (1929) (or Alice in Music Land) by Ernest La Prade are educational works in which a new Alice meets animated musical instruments and learns about the symphony orchestra and music.
- 1977 – Blabberwacky by Walter Banks, retelling Carroll's Jabberwocky with standard English words substituted for the nonce-words of the original.
- 1984 – Alice Through the Needle's Eye by Gilbert Adair, a sequel in which Alice falls through the eye of a needle and traverses Wonderland once again. (New ed. 2012, ISBN 978-1-78201-000-5)
- 1993 – Malice in Wonderland by Wallace Wood, a XXX comic parody.
- 1996 – Automated Alice by Jeff Noon, a sequel in which Alice enters a grandfather clock and emerges in future Manchester, meeting many bizarre denizens including an invisible cat named Quark and Celia, the Automated Alice.
- 1998 – Otherland by Tad Williams, a science fiction series heavily influenced by Alice in Wonderland. There are sections involving a Red Queen, the chess-squares concept from Looking Glass, and villains who take the form of Tweedledum and Tweedledee.
- 2006 – The Looking Glass Wars by Frank Beddor, a trilogy implying that Carroll distorted the story of Princess Alyss Heart (a.k.a. Alice Liddell), who had been sent to Earth when the evil Queen Redd conquered Wonderland. The series follows Alyss' exploits with familiar characters cast in new roles.
- 2007 – Alice in Sunderland by Bryan Talbot, a graphic novel exploring the links between Carroll and the Sunderland area, with wider themes of history, myth and storytelling — and the truth about what happened to Sid James on stage at the Sunderland Empire Theatre.
- 2009 – Wonderland Revisited and the Games Alice Played There by Keith Sheppard, in which Alice finds herself back in Wonderland and has a number of boardgame-themed adventures. (ISBN 978-1-904808-34-3)
- 2010 – Alice in Verse: The Lost Rhymes of Wonderland by J.T. Holden, retelling Carroll's classic tales entirely in rhyming verse. (ISBN 978-0-9825089-9-2).
- 2011 – Alice in Zombieland by Nickolas Cook and illustrated by Brent Cardillo, retelling the story but with more zombies.
- 2012 – The Red Country by jibrailis, a prequel in which the Red Queen and White Queen first discover Wonderland.
- 2013 – Alice in 9 Circles of Wonderhell by Catt Dahman, in which Alice is transformed into a formidable warrior, following a rabbit-like guide on a mission to stop the dead walking the earth.
- 2013 – Splintered by A.G. Howard, a book series in which a descendant of Alice Liddel, Alyssa Gardner, finds out the truth about the dark secrets of Wonderland. (ISBN 1419704281)
- 2014 – Chainsaw Alice in Wonderland by Khurt Khave, retelling the story with themes and settings of the sci-fi, horror and steampunk genres.
- 2015 – The Chronicles of Alice by Christina Henry, a horror series retelling the Carroll stories.
- 2015 – After Alice by Gregory Maguire, a sequel in which two children, Siam and Ada, follow Alice into Wonderland and retrace her footsteps. (ISBN 978-0060548957)
- 2015 – Alice's Nightmare in Wonderland by Jonathan Green, a horror gamebook set in Wonderland. (ISBN 978-1909679597)
- 2015 – The White Rabbit Tales, a series by D. R. Moody following the character of the White Rabbit through short stories and a novel. The short stories are prequels, whereas the novel takes place simultaneously to Carroll's original, but following the White Rabbit instead of Alice.
- 2016 – Heartless by Marissa Meyer, in which readers get a better understanding of how the Queen of Hearts became the heartless, white rose-despising tyrant she is in Carroll's Wonderland.
- 2017 – The Secret Way of Alice by Travis Arias, an introduction to the process of spiritual development in the form of commentaries and explanations of the ideas, symbols and characters found in Alice in Wonderland.
- 2017 – Alice Returns by Nayantara Ghosh, a sequel in which Alice returns to Wonderland to save it from her childhood friend-turned enemy, Ivy. The story was written by the author when she was eleven years old.
- 2018 – A Blade So Black by L.L. McKinney, a modern retelling that imagines Alice as a black teenage girl from Atlanta. McKinney uses Wonderland and the creatures that dwell within it to explore themes of nightmares, fears, and generational trauma. (ISBN 978-1-250-15390-6)
- 2019 – Ever Alice by H.J. Ramsay, a sequel in which Alice returns to Wonderland under orders from the White Rabbit to kill an increasingly unstable Queen of Hearts. (ISBN 978-0-9969239-4-1)
- 2019 – Bernard Pepperlin by Cara Hoffman, a sequel which follows the Dormouse as it falls into a teacup and swims through into another world. ISBN 978-0062865441
- 2019 – Wonderland: An Anthology edited by Marie O' Regan and Paul Kane is a collection of short stories influenced or inspired by Alice in Wonderland.
- 2021 – Alice's Adventures under Water by Lenny de Rooy, a sequel in which Alice falls through a lake into an underwater world. The book is written in Carroll's style, and contains many new puns, poems and parodies. It also has different layers of hidden references, like the original books. (ISBN 9789090346151)
- 2024 – Alice in vaccination land Faringdon, the White Rabbit Press, limited edition of 50 copies, (ISBN 978-1854760548)
- 2025 – Alice: Twisted Tales of Familiar Faces by Audrey Brice, in which Alice is a budding serial killer with a thirst for blood. After capturing the White Rabbit with plans to torture and kill him, she spares his life when he promises her greater prey—the Mad Hatter and the Queen of Hearts.

=== Literature containing allusions and influences ===
- Adventures in Skitzland from The Chicken Market and Other Fairy Tales (1877) by Henry Morley was inspired after meeting Lewis Carroll at the Ocean Hotel (then known as the Kings Head Hotel) in Sandown Isle of Wight in 1874. A copy of the book as well as others by Morley survived in Carroll's rooms after he died.
- Davy and the Goblin; or, What Followed Reading "Alice's Adventures in Wonderland" (1884) by Charles E. Carryl. (New edition 2011, ISBN 978-1-904808-65-7)
- The Admiral's Caravan (1892) by Charles E. Carryl. (New edition 2011, ISBN 978-1-904808-66-4)
- Finnegans Wake (1939) by James Joyce is famously influenced by Alice in Wonderland. The novel is about a dream, and includes such lines as: "Alicious, twinstreams twinestraines, through alluring glass or alas in jumboland?" and "... Wonderlawn's lost us for ever. Alis, alas, she broke the glass! Liddell lokker through the leafery, ours is mistery of pain."
- French philosopher Gilles Deleuze writes extensively on Alice in Wonderland and the paradoxes contained within it in The Logic of Sense (1969).
- Gödel, Escher, Bach (1979) by Douglas Hofstadter contains numerous references to Alice in Wonderland.
- The Mordant's Need series (1986–1987) by Stephen R. Donaldson tells the story of a woman named Terisa who travels from modern Earth to a medieval setting where there is a form of magic based on mirrors. Instead of reflecting images, mirrors are used to "translate" people and things between locations and realities. The author also bases much of the plot on a metaphor of the game of checkers (or "hop-board") instead of chess.
- City of Glass (1987) by Paul Auster contains a reference to Chapter IV: Humpty Dumpty of Through the Looking-Glass.
- Stasiland (2003) by Anna Funder is a non-fiction text which explores the regime of the German secret police and the Berlin wall, with many allusions to Alice in Wonderland throughout.
- The King in the Window (2005) by Adam Gopnik.
- The first book of Echo Falls by Peter Abrahams features main character Ingrid Levin-Hill starring in a stage production of Alice's Adventures in Wonderland.
- White Rabbit Chronicles (2012–2019) by Gena Showalter is set in a modern-day world of zombies and zombie killers, and plays off Carrollian themes while including the titular character Alice Bell.
- The Wonderland Gambit series by Jack Chalker is given a science-esque setting, but plays heavily on both Carrollian characters and themes.
- The Riverworld series by Philip José Farmer uses Alice Liddell as a character.
- The eleventh book of A Series of Unfortunate Events by Lemony Snicket uses Carroll's The Walrus and the Carpenter to reveal a coded message. The book also features a beach named Briny Beach.
- Vladimir Nabokov translated Alice into his native Russian as Аня в Стране Чудес (Anya in Wonderland). His novels include many Carrollian allusions, such as the spoof book titles that run through Ada, or Ardor. However, Nabokov told his student and annotator Alfred Appel that the infamous Lolita, with its paedophilic protagonist, makes no conscious allusions to Carroll despite the novel's photography theme and Carroll's interest in the art form.
- British writer Jeff Noon has inserted many Carrollian allusions into a series of cyberpunk novels, beginning with Vurt (1993), that are set in a fantasy-future Manchester. In the books, Noon applies a logical extension of the Wonderland and Looking-Glass World concepts into a virtual reality cyberverse that characters occasionally get lost in. One possible interpretation of the books is that everything happens in the dream of Alice, akin to the supposed "dream of the Red King" in Through the Looking-Glass. Noon also wrote Automated Alice, which he calls a "trequel" to the Alice books as well as being a continuation of the Vurt series.
- Carroll's work is a major subtext in Joyce Carol Oates' novel Wonderland.
- John Ringo's Looking Glass military hard science fiction book series, Into the Looking Glass, Vorpal Blade, Manxome Foe, and Claws That Catch.
- HaJaBaRaLa, a Bengali "nonsense story" by Sukumar Ray, features a little boy who enters a fantasy world full of fantastic comic creatures.
- The title of the teen novel Go Ask Alice (author said to be Beatrice Sparks) is taken from Jefferson Airplane's White Rabbit, which took major imagery from Alice in Wonderland.
- Sign of Chaos, written by Roger Zelazny as part of The Chronicles of Amber, features two chapters taking place in a manufactured Shadow designed to resemble Wonderland as part of a drug-induced hallucination.
- A Wonderlandiful World, the third book in the Ever After High series, features the Jabberwock as its primary antagonist.

=== Comics, manga, and graphic novels ===
- Several Batman villains and stories are based on characters from the books:
  - The Mad Hatter dresses like the Carroll character and often quotes from the books.
  - Tweedledum and Tweedledee are named for the characters in Through the Looking Glass.
  - The graphic novel, Arkham Asylum: A Serious House on Serious Earth, itself loosely based on Alice in Wonderland, features numerous direct quotes from and references to Carroll and his books.
- Heart no Kuni no Alice (Alice in the Country of Hearts), written by Quin Rose, is a manga series based on Alice in Wonderland.
- Alan Moore's comic, The League of Extraordinary Gentlemen, Volume II, contains a section called "The New Traveller's Almanac". The almanac contains reports about investigations of various strange locations and phenomena well known from fiction, including a thinly veiled discussion of Alice on p. 28, in which it is revealed that, after returning from her adventures through the looking-glass, her organs were on the wrong side of her body and she was no longer able to digest normal food.
- Alan Moore also included teenage and adult versions of Alice as characters in his erotic graphic novel, Lost Girls.
- From 2009 to 2010, Leah Moore and John Reppion adapted both Alice's Adventures in Wonderland and Through the Looking-Glass into a four-issue comic book series titled The Complete Alice In Wonderland. Published by Dynamite Entertainment, the first two issues are based on Alice's Adventures in Wonderland, while the remaining two are based on Through the Looking-Glass. In 2010, all four issues of The Complete Alice In Wonderland were rereleased in one volume.
- Jun Mochizuki's Pandora Hearts contains heavy references to Alice in Wonderland. The main character is Oz Vessalius, who finds the mysterious girl Alice. He eventually begins fighting against and among Chains, creatures from a dimension known as the Abyss whose names are taken directly from the book (Mad Hatter, March Hare, etc.), in order to regain her lost memories. There was also an omake between chapters 44 and 45 called Gil in Wonderland, which parodies the beginning of Alice in Wonderland. Gilbert, another character from the series, takes the place of Alice and falls down a rabbit hole.
- In 2008, Disney Press and Slave Labor Graphics released a graphic novel called Wonderland about the White Rabbit's housemaid, Mary Ann. It is written by Tommy Kovac and illustrated by Sonny Liew.
- An issue of the comic book series Marvel Fairy Tales is a basic retelling of Alice in Wonderland, with the superheroine Stature playing the role of Alice. There are also Wonderland versions of her fellow Young Avengers and her father Scott Lang, as well as Tigra as the Cheshire Cat.
- In the anime series Kyousogiga, the protagonist enters the "mirror capital" in search of a black rabbit. The ONA preceding the show begins with the poem A Boat Beneath a Sunny Sky from Through the Looking-Glass.
- Alice in Murderland, a manga series by Kaori Yuki
- A Japanese manga series, called Alice in Borderland, was released in 2014. The manga also takes names of characters from the original story as nicknames of the manga characters. The main characters, Arisu, Karube, and Chōta, are transported to a seemingly post-apocalyptic-like parallel world. After stepping into what seems to be an empty festival, they are greeted by a woman who tells them that they have been taken to a world called "Borderland" and must now participate in deadly games. A 3-episode original video animation (OVA) was released in 2014 to 2015 and a Netflix live-action adaptation series was released in 2020.
- One of The Simpsons comic books contains a parody called "Lisa's Adventures in Wordland", in which Lisa dreams about visiting a world themed around the English language.
- One of the stories in a fairy-tale themed Betty and Veronica comic book is an adaptation called "Betty in Wonderland", where Betty tells the kids she babysits a story about herself and her friends in Wonderland.
- Rozen Maiden by Peach-Pit, about seven sentient bisque dolls competing to become the perfect doll dubbed "Alice", which is a reference to the eponymous protagonist.
- Kagihime Monogatari Eikyū Alice Rondo by Kaishaku
- Gaito Alice by Ichi Kurage
- Shiro Ari by Pepu
- Fairy Tale Battle Royale by Soraho Ina
- Heroines Game by Tabasa Iori
- Bibliomania by Junpei Fujita
- Black Rose Alice by Setona Mizushiro
- Gakuen Alice by Tachibana Higuchi
- Alice the 19th by Yuu Watase
- Are You Alice? by Ai Ninomiya and Ikumi Katagiri
- Alice in Wonderland (1934–1935) was a comic strip adaptation drawn by Edward D. Kuekes and written by Olive Ray Scott. This version also featured a "topper" strip, Knurl the Gnome. The strip was distributed by United Feature Syndicate.
- Walt Disney's Alice in Wonderland (1951, Dell Comics).
- Walt Disney's Alice in Wonderland (1965, Gold Key Comics)
- Walt Disney's Alice in Wonderland (Whitman, 1984)
- "The Complete Alice in Wonderland" (2009, Dynamite Entertainment).
- Return to Wonderland (2007, Zenescope Entertainment).
- Alice in Wonderland (2011, Zenescope Entertainment)
- Alice in Weirdworld (2020, Flying Buffalo Incorporated)
- Sakura Kinoshita's Fushigi no Kuni no Alice (2007)
- A decolonising rewriting of Alice's Adventures in Wonderland with Alice recast as a non-binary Ojibwe-Anishinaabe teenager, Aimée, appeared in 2021 as Rabbit Chase.

== Film ==
Alice in Wonderland (1903) directed by Cecil Hepworth and Percy Stow, the first film adaptation based on the books

Alice's Wonderland (1923) directed by Walt Disney, the first of the Alice Comedies

Not to be confused with actual adaptations of the Alice and Looking-Glass books, these are films which are based on elements of the books.

- The Alice Comedies, a series of live action/animated shorts created by Walt Disney and Ub Iwerks in the 1920s which initially were loosely based on Alice in Wonderland.
- Smashing Time (1967), in which many of the characters are named after nonsense poems in Through the Looking Glass
- Alice or the Last Escapade, a 1977 French film directed by Claude Chabrol about a girl named Alice who gets into her own otherworldly adventure.
- Jabberwocky (1977) a film by Terry Gilliam set in medieval times and featuring the Jabberwock.
- Dreamchild, the 1985 Gavin Millar film, in which a reporter attempts to uncover the 'true story' of the Alice tales from an 80-year-old woman who may or may not be Alice Liddel. Featuring grotesque, aged versions of the Alice characters designed by Jim Henson's Creature shop, the film explores the relationships adults have with the fictional characters from their childhoods.
- Resident Evil (2002) contains various references to Alice's Adventures in Wonderland.
- Tideland (2005). A fantasy-horror style fairytale in which a young girl plunges into an imaginary fantasy world to escape from her morbid and dark reality being raised by drug-addicted parents against a barren Texas landscape. There are several scenes in which Alice In Wonderland is being read aloud, as well as a scene in which she falls down a rabbit hole reminiscent of Alice’s descent into Wonderland. Director Terry Gilliam has stated that he was heavily inspired by Carroll’s novel.
- The Last Mimsy (2007). Science fiction tale of another young girl who gets a look into the looking glass, guided by the same rabbit as Alice.
- Phoebe in Wonderland (2008), starring Elle Fanning as a little girl whose role as Alice in a school play helps her deal with her Tourette syndrome.
- Alice (miniseries) (2009), a modern interpretation TV miniseries broadcast on Syfy
- Malice in Wonderland, set in present-day England; the characters are inspired by those in Carroll's novels.
- Alice in Murderland (2010) A horror movie based on characters from Alice's Adventures In Wonderland.
- Alice in Wonderland, (2010), a film by Tim Burton, starring Johnny Depp as the Mad Hatter in which a 19-year-old Alice played by Mia Wasikowska returns to Wonderland for more adventures.
- In Marx Reloaded (2011), Karl Marx is depicted in scenes which parody both The Matrix and Alice's Adventures in Wonderland.
- Red Kingdom Rising (2014), an independent fantasy horror film inspired by Alice's Adventures in Wonderland and Through the Looking-Glass. The film uses the characters of Alice and the Red King with the concepts of dream reversal and symbolism.
- Alice Through the Looking Glass (2016), the sequel to the Burton-directed Alice in Wonderland, with Mia Wasikowska reprising her role as Alice.

=== Animation ===
- Betty in Blunderland (1934), Betty Boop's adventures in Wonderland.
- Thru the Mirror (1936), Mickey Mouse's adventures in a dream world inspired by reading Through the Looking-Glass but with animated cards as in Alice in Wonderland.
- Alice in Wonderland (1951), Walt Disney's animated feature-length film.
- Alice in Wonderland, two films produced by Kievnauchfilm
- Malice in Wonderland (1982) is a surrealist short film inspired by Alice in Wonderland.
- Nippon Animation produced an anime of Alice in Wonderland in 1983 to 1984. This anime is an adaptation of an original story in which Alice and her rabbit Benny take a trip to Wonderland, returning home at the end of each episode.
- The Care Bears Adventure in Wonderland, a 1987 film where Wonderland is visited by the Care Bears. The film's depiction of Alice bears a resemblance to the Princess of Hearts and takes her place while they search for the real princess.
- Alice in Wonderland (1988 film) Australian 51-minute direct-to-video animated film from Burbank Films Australia
- Neco z Alenky (Alice) A 1988 full-length stop motion animation by Czech Republic artist Jan Švankmajer.
- Garfield and Friends had an episode called "Orson in Wonderland", in which Orson imagines himself visiting Wonderland and his friends as some of the characters.
- Miyuki-chan in Wonderland (1993), an anime adapted from a manga by Clamp, is an erotic lesbian rendition of Alice.
- "Mindy in Wonderland" (1996) is an Animaniacs episode based on Alice in Wonderland, with Mindy in place of Alice.
- Project ARMS (プロジェクトアームズ? Puroziĕkutoāmuzu) (1997) is a manga/anime series that is heavily influenced by Alice's Adventures in Wonderland. The ARMS weapons are named after characters in Lewis Carroll's Alice in Wonderland.
- Alice SOS (April 1998), where four kids go on an adventure to different worlds to rescue Alice after she has been kidnapped by a mysterious evil horse.
- Serial Experiments Lain (July 1998) tells the story of a girl who is drawn into the cyberspace "underground" of the Wired, and features a character named Arisu ("Alice") Mizuki (this character is a second use of one created by the scenarist, Chiaki Konaka, for the animation "Alice in Cyberland").
- Cardcaptor Sakura has two episodes in the anime adaptation that refer to the Alice stories:
  1. "Sakura's Little Adventure" (October 1998) subtly references Alice's Adventures in Wonderland, as Sakura is shrunken by the Clow Card called The Little and wears a dress resembling the one worn by Alice in the original illustrations and the 1951 Disney movie.
  2. "Sakura in Wonderland" (1999) is more clearly based on the Alice stories. Sakura portrays Alice while the supporting characters in the anime series portray several other characters in the Alice stories.
- Gakuen Alice (2003) is about a school where people's unique abilities are called "Alices". The currency used is a "rabbit". In the anime adaptation, the main character Mikan is dressed in Alice's Disney-recognized blue dress and wandering through Wonderland in the opening credits.
- Kagihime Monogatari Eikyuu Alice Rondo (February 2004), a manga and its anime adaptation that focuses on the completion of a fictional sequel called The Eternal Alice.
- Brandy & Mr. Whiskers (2004) is somewhat similar to the Alice books; the main heroine becomes stranded in the Amazon because of a white rabbit, and encounters creatures like bickering twins and a tyrannical dictator.
- Pandora Hearts is a 2006 manga and 2009 anime about a boy, Oz, who is banished into the prison known as the "Abyss" and saved by a "Chain" known as Alice. The mystery begins as Oz unravels the secrets behind Alice's lost memories, his own mysterious past, the Abyss, and the strange organization known as Pandora. It heavily references Carroll's Alice books.
- Eleanor's Secret (2009; original French title: Kérity la maison des contes), is an animated film about a boy who inherits a library of fairy tale books; the characters come to life and they go on an adventure together. Alice and the White Rabbit are among the most prominently featured characters and sections from the book are read aloud in several languages in the film.
- Black Butler is a Japanese anime, with original story by Yana Toboso. There was a TV series titled Ciel in Wonderland based on Alice in Wonderland. It is about Ciel Phantomhive, who followed his butler, Sebastian, after noticing bunny ears and tail appearing on him, to a place called "Wonderland". He searches for the "white rabbit", which is actually Sebastian, but his search is interrupted by various characters who call him "Alice".
- Code Geass is a Japanese anime which had an OVA based on Alice in Wonderland called "Nunnally in Wonderland". The story revolves around the main character, Lelouch, wishing to please his sister Nunnally. To do so, he uses his power to hypnotize other characters into believing they are characters from the story Alice in Wonderland, with Nunnally taking the role of Alice.
- Ouran High School Host Club is a Japanese romance and comedy anime. In the thirteenth episode, "Haruhi in Wonderland!", Haruhi's dream about the day of her admission into Ouran High School becomes an illusionary Alice in Wonderland fantasy in which various other members of the cast take on the roles of characters from the story.
- Ever After High animated TV special Way Too Wonderland revolves around the main cast's journey through Wonderland.
- RWBY is a 3D animated, anime-inspired series produced by Rooster Teeth and created by Monty Oum. The series includes allusions to numerous fairy tale stories and other pre-existing tales. The show's ninth volume is heavily inspired by the Alice stories, including an in-universe tale referred to as "The Girl Who Fell Through the World", featuring a main character named Alyx. Other notable characters alluding to the Alice lore are the Red Prince, the Curious Cat, and the Jabberwalker. The volume takes place in a location known as the Ever After, alluding to Wonderland.
- The Night Before Christmas in Wonderland, a 2024 animated movie that acts as a crossover with the 1823 poem A Visit from St. Nicholas.

=== Television ===
- Alice in Wonderland (or What's a Nice Kid Like You Doing in a Place Like This?), a 1966 ABC animated comedy special loosely based on the book, in which Hedda Hopper is caricatured as and voices Hedda the Mad Hatter, and Fred Flintstone and Barney Rubble from The Flintstones played the Caterpillar.
- Lost in Space (1965–1968): In the episode "The Magic Mirror", Penny goes through a mirror and discovers another universe with a lonely little boy as its sole occupant.
- The Star Trek episode "Shore Leave" features a recreated White Rabbit and Alice, brought to life by a computer which makes thoughts into reality.
- A segment of Carl Sagan's television series Cosmos: A Personal Voyage (1980), titled "Gravity in Wonderland", used the Mad Hatter's Tea Party to illustrate the effects of gravity, culminating in a black hole.
- The Disney Channel series Adventures in Wonderland (1991–1995) is based on the first book, featuring many of the major characters. Alice enters Wonderland in each episode by walking through her mirror, an allusion to the second book.
- Lost (2004–2010) is heavily influenced by Alice in Wonderland and contains many references to Alice's world. The third-season finale was also named after the second book.
- This is Wonderland (2004–2006), a Canadian legal drama/comedy which follows the main character Alice De Raey as she encounters characters ranging from the truly desperate to the bizarre, is partly inspired by the characters of the Alice books.
- Abby in Wonderland (2008) is a direct-to-DVD Sesame Street adaptation.
- Alice (2009) is a Syfy channel miniseries based on the novels, but set in the modern day, where Wonderland has evolved to today's standards and Alice as a dark-haired assertive woman.
- Warehouse 13, a Syfy channel TV series, featured an evil version of Alice during the second half of season 1. In the show, Lewis Carroll's books were not fake, but chronicles based on Alice's adventures in Wonderland masquerading as fiction. The mirror she passed through, after enough uses, made Alice go "Mad as a Hatter", turning her into a sociopathic killer.
- Once Upon a Time in Wonderland (2013) is an ABC channel miniseries based on the novels, a spinoff from the successful TV series Once Upon a Time. Both series combines elements from various Disney movies and are inspired by the narration of LOST, which the creators also worked on. In this version, Alice is locked in an asylum, believed to be insane after her telling of Wonderland. Her doctors aim to cure her with a treatment that will make her forget everything about Wonderland and the boyfriend she lost there. However, she is saved and transported back to Wonderland by the wisecracking Knave of Hearts and the White Rabbit. Now, Alice is determined to find her love while evading the plots of Jafar and the Red Queen and dealing with the whimsical dangers of Wonderland, including the mysterious Jabberwocky.
- Alice in Borderland (2020) is a Netflix series based on the Japanese manga series of the same name.
- Alice's Wonderland Bakery (2022) follows the great-granddaughter of the original Alice as she works at the titular bakery.

== Theatre and musicals ==
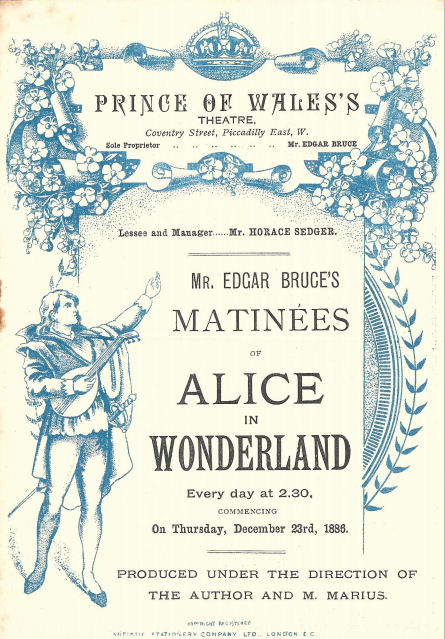
Alice in Wonderland (1886)

- Alice in Wonderland is an 1886 West End musical pantomime.
- Alice in Wonderland (1912 play) was featured at the Forest Theater, July 1912, in Carmel-by-the-Sea, California, adapted by director Perry Newberry.
- Alice in Wonderland (1915 play) by Alice Gerstenberg
- Alice in Wonderland, a 1932 stage adaptation by Eva Le Gallienne and Florida Friebus which was performed on Broadway in 1932-1933 and again in 1988.
- Alice in Wonderland, a 1970 adaptation by Charlotte Chorpenning
- Alice in Wonderland, a 1970 adaptation by André Gregory
- Alice's Adventures in Wonderland (1977 radio play) is a musical adapted for radio with additional lyrics by John Wells and music composed and conducted by Carl Davis with Polly James as Alice. World Premier broadcast took place on December 12, 1977, on BBC Radio 4 FM's Monday Play
- Alice in Wonderland, a 1978 adaptation by Brainerd Duffield
- Looking-Glass is a play by Michael Sutton and Cynthia Mandelberg based on the life of Charles Dodgson (Lewis Carroll). It opened at the Entermedia Theater on June 14, 1982.
- Alice in Wonderland (1986) is a musical by Carl Davis and additional lyrics by John Wells. First performance December 13, 1986, at the Lyric Theatre with the Lyric Company and Stuart Hutchinson as musical director. The radio play adaptation of the musical was first broadcast in 1977 as part of BBC Radio 4's Monday Play series.
- Wonderland: A New Alice is a 2009 musical set in New York City.
- Alice by Laura Wade is a 2010 musical retelling of the story set in Sheffield.
- Alice by Heart is a 2012 musical set during World War II in London, following The Blitz.
- Wonderland: Alice's Rock & Roll Adventure, a 2015 musical adaptation by Rachel Rockwell and Michael Mahler

== Art ==
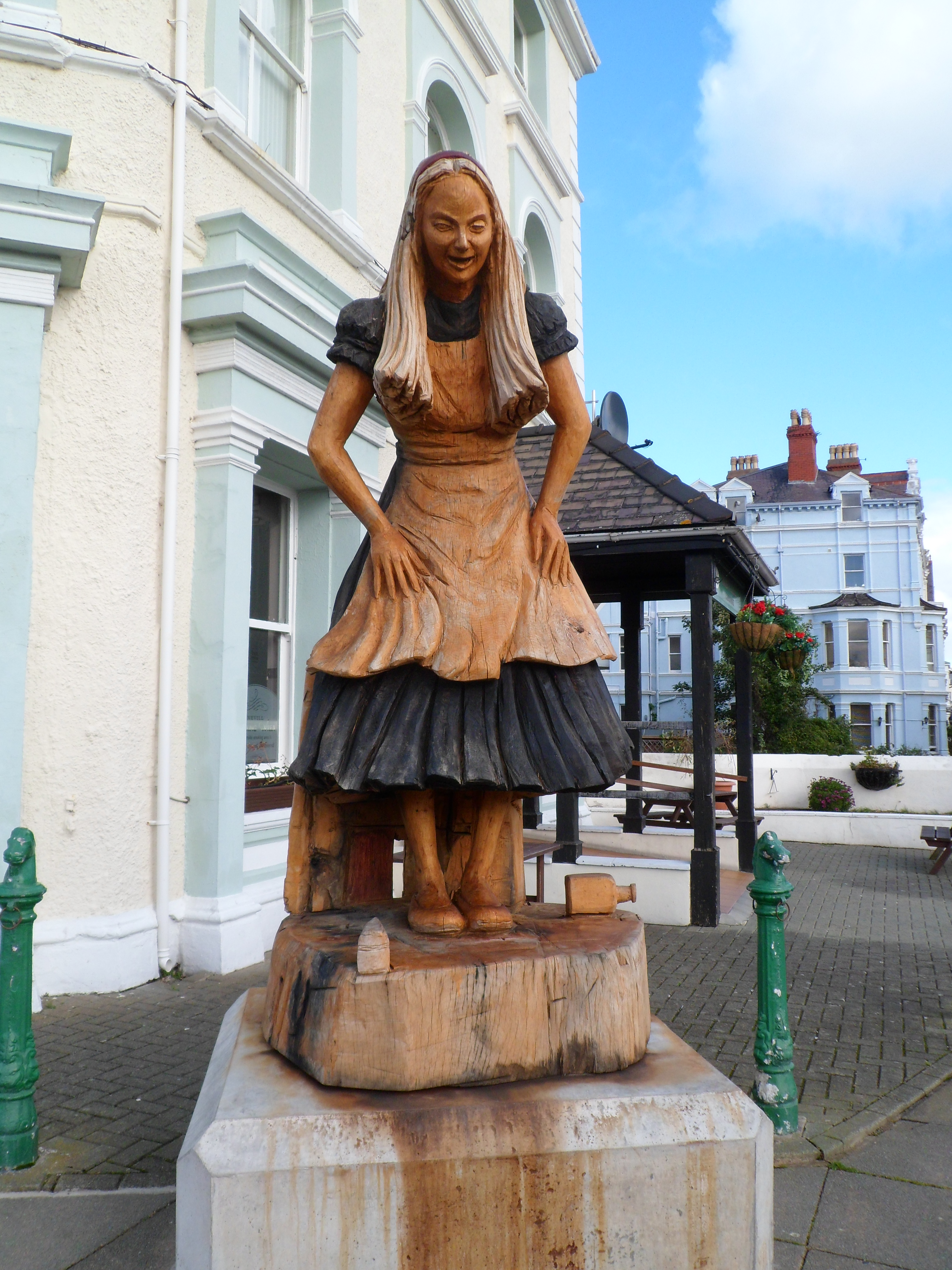
Statue, Llandudno, Wales

- In 1956 Charles Blackman, after listening to an audiobook of Alice's Adventures in Wonderland, painted a series of 46 paintings of Alice with other characters from the series.
- In 1959 sculptor José de Creeft created the Alice in Wonderland sculpture, patterned on illustrations drawn by John Tenniel, that sits to the north of Conservatory Water in Central Park in Manhattan, New York City. It includes an 11 feet (3.4 m) tall Alice sitting on a large mushroom at a tea party held by the Mad Hatter with the March Hare, the White Rabbit, the Dormouse, the Cheshire Cat, the Caterpillar, and Alice's kitten Dinah in her lap.
- In 1969, Salvador Dalí produced 12 illustrations based on Alice's Adventures in Wonderland.
- All Saints' Church, Daresbury memorialises the story in several stained glass windows.

== Music ==
=== Classical music and opera ===
Music inspired by, referencing, or incorporating texts from the Alice books include:

- Deems Taylor: orchestral work Through the Looking-Glass (1918)
- Cecil Forsyth: six movement orchestral suite Alice in Wonderland (1927)
- Irving Fine: choral work Three Choruses from Alice in Wonderland (1942)
- David Del Tredici: An Alice Symphony (1969), Final Alice (1976), Child Alice (1980/1981), Haddock's Eyes (1986)
- Carlo Forlivesi, Through the Looking-Glass (2005) for electronics. The piece is included in the CD album SILENZIOSA LUNA (ALCD 76).
- Unsuk Chin: opera Alice in Wonderland (2007)
- Alan John: opera Through the Looking Glass (2008)
- John Craton: ballet Through the Looking-Glass (2010)
- Joseph Hallman: Ballet/Dramaturgy: ALICE (2010)
- Australian composer Leon Coward's Beautiful Soup (2014) a lament for piano, string orchestra and vocal ensemble, premiered by Camerata Academica of the Antipodes.

=== Popular music ===
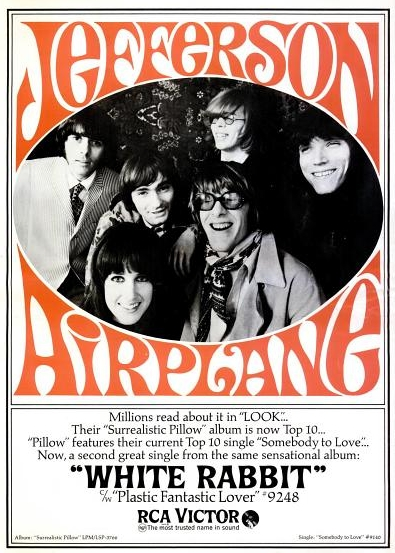
Advertisement for Jefferson Airplane's "White Rabbit"

- Jefferson Airplane's song "White Rabbit" from their 1967 album Surrealistic Pillow mentions Alice, the Dormouse, the hookah-smoking caterpillar, the White Knight, and the Red Queen. Written by Grace Slick, it shows parallels between the story and the hallucinatory effects of psychedelic drugs (LSD).
- The Beatles's song "Lucy in the Sky with Diamonds" (1967).
- "The Walrus and the Carpenter" inspired John Lennon to write "I Am the Walrus" of the Beatles (1967).
- British psychedelic rock band Boeing Duveen and The Beautiful Soup released a single in 1968 with the A-side "Jabberwock".
- Ambrosia's song, "Mama Frog" from their album Ambrosia (1975), contains a narration of "jabberwok".
- The 1978 Chick Corea album, The Mad Hatter, has its music, song titles and album title based on characters and passages from the story.
- Yugoslav and Serbian pop rock band Alisa, whose name is a Slavic analogue to the name Alice and used in Slavic languages translations of Carroll's books, formed in 1984 and was named after Carroll's works. The imagery of their albums released during the 1984–2024 period was frequently inspired by Alice in Wonderland.
- The thrash metal / speed metal band Annihilator released a number of albums inspired directly and indirectly by the novel, most notably Alice in Hell (1989) and Never, Neverland (1990).
- Symphony X's 1998 release, Twilight in Olympus, contains "Through the Looking-Glass" – a 13-minute epic about the book.
- Lisa Mitchell's song "Sometimes I Feel Like Alice" (2007) is based on Alice's experiences in Wonderland.
- The Japanese band Buck-Tick released a single in 2007 titled "Alice in Wonder Underground", a gothic rendition with lyrics and music video that have a very macabre depiction of the story, with Alice chasing her rabbit, the band periodically becoming rabbits, and the lead vocalist Atsushi Sakurai dressed as the Mad Hatter.
- Hatcham Social's debut album You Dig The Tunnel, I'll Hide The Soil (2009) was influenced by Alice's adventures, which references aspects in the songs such as tunnels, the scene of Alice changing in size and almost drowning in tears, anthropomorphic animals, and passing through mirrors, and the track "Jabberwocky" is a spoken word reading of Carroll's poem over a bed of music.
- Avril Lavigne wrote and recorded the song "Alice" (2010) for Tim Burton's film Alice in Wonderland, which is on the soundtrack Almost Alice.
- Kerli's song "Tea Party" (2010), which appeared on the Almost Alice soundtrack, was inspired by the mad tea party from Alice in Wonderland.
- Monkey Majik's song "Wonderland" (2011) make references to characters in the story such as "the white rabbit", the caterpillar, "royal hearts", and Tweedle-dee and Tweedle-dum.
- The song "C'mon" (2011) by Panic! At the Disco and Fun. is Alice themed and portrays Brendon Urie, lead singer of Panic! At the Disco, as Alice and Nate Ruess, lead singer of Fun., as the Mad Hatter.
- Egypt Central's song "White Rabbit" (2011) was released on the same-titled studio album.
- AKB48's B-side song, "First Rabbit" (2012), which is later also performed by JKT48.
- Anson Seabra's song "Welcome to Wonderland" (2018) makes references to Wonderland through a narrator acting as a tour guide for their lover, in a dream sequence. The narrator makes references to the "Drink Me" bottle and the "Eat Me" cake, as well as the talking playing cards, the Mad Hatter and his tea party, the Cheshire Cat, and the White Rabbit and his clock.
- On Aerosmith's 2001 album, Just Push Play, the song "Sunshine" talks about Alice and other characters of the book. In the music video, Steven Tyler is shown trying to protect a young, blonde Alice in the woods, along with depictions of the Red Queen and the White Rabbit, among others.
- The Birthday Massacre is a Gothic/Industrial band that includes Alice In Wonderland themes both visually and musically, including a song titled "Looking Glass".
- Family Force 5 performs the song "Topsy Turvy" for Tim Burton's 2010 film Alice in Wonderland, but it was not part of the album.
- The debut album, Alice's Inferno, by Spanish Gothic metal band Forever Slave, is a concept album focusing on Alice's life after her parents' death.
- Hypnogaja performs the song Looking Glass on their 2005 album Below Sunset.
- Jewel released an album and single with the title Goodbye Alice in Wonderland.
- Malice Mizer's 1997 Sans Retour Voyage "Derniere" ~Encoure Une Fois~ concert video was an interpretation of Alice in Wonderland by the band.
- The video for the Tom Petty song "Don't Come Around Here No More" portrays Alice, the Mad Hatter, and other Wonderland elements. Producer Dave Stewart appears as the Caterpillar.
- Neil Sedaka's single "Alice In Wonderland" reached the US Top 50 in 1963.
- Tom Waits released a 2002 album titled Alice, consisting of songs that were written for a stage adaptation of Alice.
- The German Neofolk collaboration, Werkraum, has a song called "Beware the Jabberwock!" using Carroll's poem with original music on their album Early Love Music.
- Kyary Pamyu Pamyu's music video for Tsukema Tsukeru is heavily influenced by Alice in Wonderland.
- English singer Natalia Kills's debut album, Perfectionist, featured a single titled "Wonderland" that makes reference to various fairy tales, including Alice In Wonderland. The accompanying video takes the same inspiration.
- Marilyn Manson described his album Eat Me, Drink Me (2007) as "[his] version of Alice in Wonderland."
- Siouxsie and the Banshees named their label inside Polydor Wonderland in 1983.
- Jerome Kern's "Alice in Wonderland," from The Girl from Utah (1914).
- "Alice in Wonderland'" by Sammy Fain and Bob Hilliard appears on the Bill Evans trio album Sunday at the Village Vanguard (1961).
- Violinist Lindsey Stirling released a music video called "Hold My Heart" which was inspired by Alice in Wonderland and included in her album Brave Enough.
- "Alicia en el Pais" is a song in Spanish by Argentinian musician Charly Garcia released in 1980, with reference to Argentina's military dictatorship from 1976 to 1983.
- In the title track of the German power metal band Blind Guardian's album, Imaginations from the Other Side, the main character struggles to save their childhood fantasy characters, including Alice.
- Melanie Martinez's "Mad Hatter" song from her first album.
- Lady Gaga's song "Alice" released in 2020 in the Chromatica album. It references the book starting with the chorus "My name isn't Alice, but I'll keep looking for Wonderland".
- Taylor Swift's 2014 song "Wonderland" from her album 1989 has references to Alice, with lyrics "cheshire cat smile," as well as "we found wonderland, you and I got lost in it".
- Madison Beer's song "Follow the White Rabbit" from her debut album, Life Support, is a reference to Alice in Wonderland, whom the artist has openly stated that she adores.
- "Wonderland" by Dreamcatcher references Alice as it describes a girl with "A sky blue dress, yellow glowing hair," as well as associated characters from Wonderland.
- Palaye Royale's 2022 album Fever Dream and its accompanying graphic novel contain frequent references to Alice in Wonderland.
- Each song on Maybird's 2022 album Wonderland is inspired by Alice in Wonderland.

== Games ==
=== Computer and video games ===
- In the Korean MMORPG MapleStory, an area called Root Abyss is based on Alice's Adventures in Wonderland. Alicia is a character based on Alice, and three of the four bosses are based on the characters of the novel: Von Bon is a chicken based on the White Rabbit, Pierre is a clown based on the Hatter, and the Crimson Queen is a many-faced queen based on the Queen of Hearts. Some minor NPCs in Root Abyss are also based on other characters of Alice's Adventures in Wonderland.
- Alice in Wonderland developed by Etranges Libellules. Based on the 2010 Tim Burton film.
- The 2000 Game Boy Color video game Alice in Wonderland published by Nintendo.
- 64 Trump Collection: Alice no Waku Waku Trump World by Bottom Up published in 1998 on N64.
- Alice: An Interactive Museum (1990), a point-and-click visual novel created by influential Japanese computer graphics designer Haruhiko Shono. Winner of the 1991 MITI Multimedia Grand Prix Award.
- Alice in Wonderland was adapted into a computer game by Windham Classics in 1985. It is presented as a platform game involving puzzle-solving and simplistic word parsers akin to a text adventure. The game was later remade for Philips CD-i with clay animation graphics.
- American McGee's Alice is a macabre computer game which chronologically takes place following the two Alice books. Alice is awoken from a dream of Wonderland by a house fire which killed her family and left her with serious physical and mental wounds. She is receiving treatment in Rutledge Asylum and embarks on a journey in Wonderland to restore it and restore her own mind in the process.
- Alice: Madness Returns is a direct sequel to American McGee's Alice and features Alice, now almost an adult, who tries to tackle the unresolved psychological issues related to the death of her family. Directly related to her fractured mind, Wonderland is destroyed and a mysterious train rampages across its remains.
- The 2006 mobile game Alice's Warped Wonderland (歪みの国のアリス, Yugami no kuni no Arisu, Alice in Distortion World), developed by Sunsoft as part of their "Nightmare Project" series, is a horror text adventure based on the story and world of Alice in Wonderland. It features sixteen-year-old Japanese high school student Ariko Katsuragi, also called "Alice", who explores Wonderland as she recovers the memories of her forgotten, tragic past. In 2015, a remake of the game, titled Alice's Warped Wonderland ~ Encore ~ (歪みの国のアリス, Yugami no kuni no Arisu~Encore~, Alice in Distortion World ~ Encore ~), was launched. On June 27, 2017, an English version of the game was released by Sunsoft's U.S. subsidiary. A Nintendo Switch version of the game, titled Alice's Warped Wonderland ~ REcollection (歪みの国のアリス～REcollection) was released on August 25, 2022, worldwide. A PC version was released on Steam on September 2, 2022, with English, Japanese, and Traditional Chinese language options.
- The RPG series Kingdom Hearts features Wonderland, a world and characters based on Disney's version of Wonderland. Since its appearance in the original Kingdom Hearts, Wonderland and its characters have featured in several sequels and prequels, from Kingdom Hearts Chain of Memories in 2004 to Kingdom Hearts Dark Road in 2020.
- In the intro to the Nintendo 64 game Chameleon Twist, a rabbit runs through a forest stating he is late for something and, after jumping into a tree trunk, is transported to a magical world. The player character, Davy the chameleon, follows the rabbit into the magical world. The sequel Chameleon Twist 2 once again features the rabbit and the magical world.
- The otome game Heart no Kuni no Alice and its sequels Clover no Kuni no Alice and Joker no Kuni no Alice use a story and world based on Alice in Wonderland as well as many of its characters as protagonists. The titles of the games are a play on the Japanese title of Alice in Wonderland; ふしぎの国のアリス (Fushigi no Kuni no Arisu)
- In the RPG Megami Tensei series and its subsequent spin-offs, Alice is a major boss and obtainable summon.
- In The Wonderful 101, the playable character "Wonder-Wonderland", real name Allison Trump, is a clear allusion to Alice.
- In the PC-98 game Mystic Square of the Touhou Project, one of the boss characters is named Alice. She is inspired by the story: the background music for the Extra Stage where she reappears is titled "Alice in Wonderland", playing cards appear as enemies, and the mid-boss is a King card soldier. Alice later returns in Perfect Cherry Blossom and other games of the series.
- In A Witch's Tale, several major characters and some areas are directly inspired by and even named after things from Alice's Adventures in Wonderland, while other areas draw from other fairy tales.
- Wonderland (1990), an illustrated text adventure by Magnetic Scrolls.
- Several passages from Alice's Adventures in Wonderland serve as vital clues in the 2023 Microids mystery video game Agatha Christie - Murder on the Orient Express.
- The story of JRPG eroge game Black Souls II (2018) is based on the real life of Charles Lutwidge Dodgson. The game is mainly set in a "garden" named "Wonderland", themed after the world portrayed in Alice's Adventures in Wonderland. The protagonist is tasked with finding his female relative, Alice. Most characters in the game are direct references to either characters in the book or originate from other children's books such as the series "Red Hood".
- In the upcoming psychological horror game Habromania (TBA), in development since 2022, Alice must outwit, outmatch, and possibly befriend the mildly psychotic people and creatures she encounters as she tries to return to her world - with or without going mad herself.

There is also a dorm based on the Disney adaptation in the game twisted wonderland called Heartslabyul. It specifically focuses on the queen of hearts but each character takes inspiration from a multitude of characters in the movie. Notably Riddle Rosehearts who is based on the queen of hearts specifically.

=== Role-playing games ===
- Dungeonland and The Land Beyond the Magic Mirror are translations of the two books into Advanced Dungeons and Dragons terms. Written by AD&D creator Gary Gygax, they were released in the 1980s as two gaming adventures or modules. In the game, all of Carroll's characters are translated into deadly AD&D equivalents—for example, the Cheshire Cat becomes a sabretooth tiger (Smilodon).
- Similarly, the Vorpal Sword, a magical sword that can cut through most things, has been a magical weapon in Dungeons and Dragons in many editions. Advanced Dungeons and Dragons also includes the Jabberwock from Jabberwocky as one of its many monsters.
- An adventure module for the role-playing game Paranoia was titled Alice Through the Mirrorshades, referring to both Through the Looking-Glass and the cyberpunk genre.
- Wonderland, also known as JAGS Wonderland, is a role-playing game by Marco Chacon and published by Better Mousetrap Games that is based on the perspective of Alice's Adventures in Wonderland as being horrific rather than merely fanciful.
- Jabberwocks were among the many monsters spawned by Chaos in the Warhammer Fantasy setting, alongside such beings as Cockatrices and Manticores. They were phased out as the editions passed, but the recent "Jabberslythe" from the Beasts of Chaos army is a reference to the Jabberwock and its former presence in the Warhammer world.
- Alice at the End of Her Life is an upcoming video game that follows Alice, an amnesiac girl immune to the White Rabbit Disease, and Emily, an inhabitant of Wonderland infected by the disease. They are tasked by the Queen of Hearts with stopping the disease, which has been ravaging Wonderland.

== Science and technology ==
- The Eindhoven University of Technology built the interactive ALICE installation based on the narrative Alice's Adventures in Wonderland. It addresses the western culture characteristics highlighted in the narrative. Six stages were selected and implemented as an interactive experience.
- Richard Gregory in his book Mirrors in Mind, questions why looking-glass images are right-left reversed. He explains with diagrams the reversals occurring in Carroll's Through The Looking-Glass while also pondering how a scientific phenomenon is reflected in the vocabulary of the text, dwelling on the importance of words such as "re-turning", "behind", and "back".

== Tourist attractions ==
- Blackpool Illuminations has featured numerous illuminated and animated features and tableaux based on Alice's Adventures in Wonderland.
- Blackpool Pleasure Beach has an Alice in Wonderland amusement park ride featuring characters from both Alice's Adventures in Wonderland and Through the Looking-Glass.

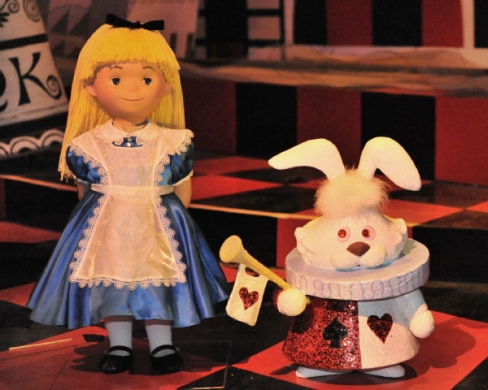
Alice and White Rabbit in It's a Small World

- Walt Disney Parks and Resorts have several attractions based on the 1951 animated film. Among them are Alice in Wonderland, Alice's Curious Labyrinth, Mad Tea Party and It's a Small World.
- Winter Park, a ski resort in Grand County, Colorado, has several trails named after Alice in Wonderland characters, including March Hare, Jabberwocky, White Rabbit, Cheshire Cat, Tweedle Dee, Tweedle Dum, and Mock Turtle. Additionally, one chairlift in the area is a double chairlift named Looking Glass. However, the main lift to these trails, the Olympia Express high speed quad, is not named after an Alice in Wonderland character, but services March Hare, White Rabbit, Jabberwocky, and Cheshire Cat.

== Food ==
- Celebrity chef Heston Blumenthal has drawn inspiration from Alice's Adventures in Wonderland in his experimental approach to gastronomy. For one of his television programmes, he created a version of the "Drink Me" potion. Heston Blumenthal: my new Alice in Wonderland menu - Telegraph Heston Blumenthal's 'Drink Me' Potion

== See also ==
- Translations of Alice's Adventures in Wonderland
- Translations of Through the Looking-Glass
- Alice in Wonderland syndrome
