= Nymphomation =

1997 novel by Jeff Noon

- Author: Jeff Noon
- Cover artist: Tim Fieldstead and Ian Murray
- Language: English
- Series: Vurt series
- Genre: Science fiction, fantastic
- Publisher: Doubleday
- Publication date: October 1997
- Publication place: United Kingdom
- Media type: Print (Hardback)
- Pages: 362 p p
- ISBN: 978-0-385-40812-7
- Preceded by: Automated Alice
- Followed by: Pixel Juice

Nymphomation is a novel by British author Jeff Noon, first published in 1997.

In terms of publishing history Nymphomation is the 4th novel in Noon's 'Vurt' series, following publication of Vurt (1993), Pollen (1995) and Automated Alice (1996) (itself simultaneously a sequel to Alice's Adventures in Wonderland and Through the Looking-Glass), though being set predominantly in 1999 it can be considered properly as a prequel to Vurt: in terms of fictional chronology of characters and settings the Vurt sequence runs Automated Alice, Nymphomation, Vurt then finally Pollen.

== Plot introduction ==
Nymphomation tells the story of a lottery in Manchester and a group attempting to crack the secrets of that lottery, but it also sets the background for much of the mythology found in Noon's previous novels.

The AnnoDomino Company has been granted a 12-month trial period to run a lottery in Manchester, before rolling it out across the rest of the country should it prove successful. The head of the company is the mysterious character known only as Mr Million. Adult players are able to purchase dominoes displaying two constantly changing numbers for one puny each. Once a week these numbers will solidify, at the same time as that week's winning numbers are displayed on television by Lady Cookie Luck and presenter Tommy Tumbler. The one person whose domino exactly matches wins 10 million; those holding half-matches wins 100 punies. Anyone who wins with a double-six becomes the new Mr Million; anyone who wins with a double-blank will win the 'Joker Bone'. The air of Manchester is alive with the sound of blurbflies: organic/mechanic creations of the AnnoDomino Company that call out adverts to the populace.

== Characters ==
Daisy Love is an 18-year-old mathematics student. She rents a room above a curry house, where she is doted on by the head-chef's son and physics student Jazir Malik. On arriving at her job in a bookshop Daisy habitually gives spare change to homeless 8 year old Celia Hobart who has a "begging hole" outside. Celia spends time with the adult Eddie Irwell, a fellow homeless person who buys her dominoes on her behalf.

== Reception ==
Publishers Weekly stated that the book would be "joyfully received".
