= Needle in the Groove =

2000 novel by Jeff Noon

- First edition
- Author: Jeff Noon
- Language: English
- Genre: Science fiction
- Publisher: Anchor Books
- Publication date: May 1, 2000
- Publication place: Great Britain
- Media type: Print (Paperback & Audiobook/ CD
- Pages: 288
- ISBN: 978-1-86230-091-0 (first edition, paperback)
- OCLC: 43339429
- Preceded by: Pixel Juice
- Followed by: Cobralingus

Needle in the Groove is a 1999 novel by British writer Jeff Noon. A music/spoken word CD was released on the same day as the book.

It tells its story through the eyes of Elliot, a young twenty-something bassist, as he finds himself playing bass for Glam Damage, a new DJ-based band who are experimenting with a new recording technology - a weird liquid/drug that remixes music when shaken.

== Book ==
The book is set in the near future of Manchester 2002, and the drugs as music metaphor is the essence of the novel. Eschewing conventional punctuation, capitalisation and grammar, the book reads as if it is a series of song lyrics.

The book also traces the history of pop music in Manchester, starting with skiffle in 1957, running through the sixties, before coming to an angry explosion with the punk of 1977 and the Buzzcocks. This love for music is also expressed by the names of the streets. Poking fun at the increasing excesses taken towards marketing our heritage, Manchester streets have been renamed after Mancunian bands and musicians. So we are given Ian Curtis Boulevard, a street called Gerald, Bee Gees Avenue and even Northern Uproar cul-de-sac.

It is the last set in the Vurt/Manchester universe. His next work, Falling Out of Cars is his first not to be set in that city.

== CD ==
Needle in the Groove

Studio album by Jeff Noon and David Toop
- Released: May 1, 2000
- Genre: Experimental/ Industrial
- Length: 47:19
- Label: Sulphur Records (UK) / Sulfur Records (USA)
- Producer: David Toop

Released on the same as the book was the musical version of Needle in the Groove. The CD was produced by both Jeff Noon and David Toop. The music is experimental/ industrial and backs Noon speaking lines from the Needle in the Groove book.

The CD was originally available from the Needle in the Groove website (now offline) for £10. Now, the CD is available in very limited amounts as there has only been one pressing of the album.

== Track listing ==
1. door code
2. scorched out for love
3. bass instruction#1
4. heavy on the download
5. glamourboys parade
6. plugged in total
7. bass instruction#2
8. dubbed out for love
9. the kiss
10. the kiss (recorded)
11. bass instruction#3
12. vibegeist (spirit of the groove)
13. smoked out for love
14. bass instruction#4
