= USS Nebraska (SSBN-739) =

Submarine of the United States

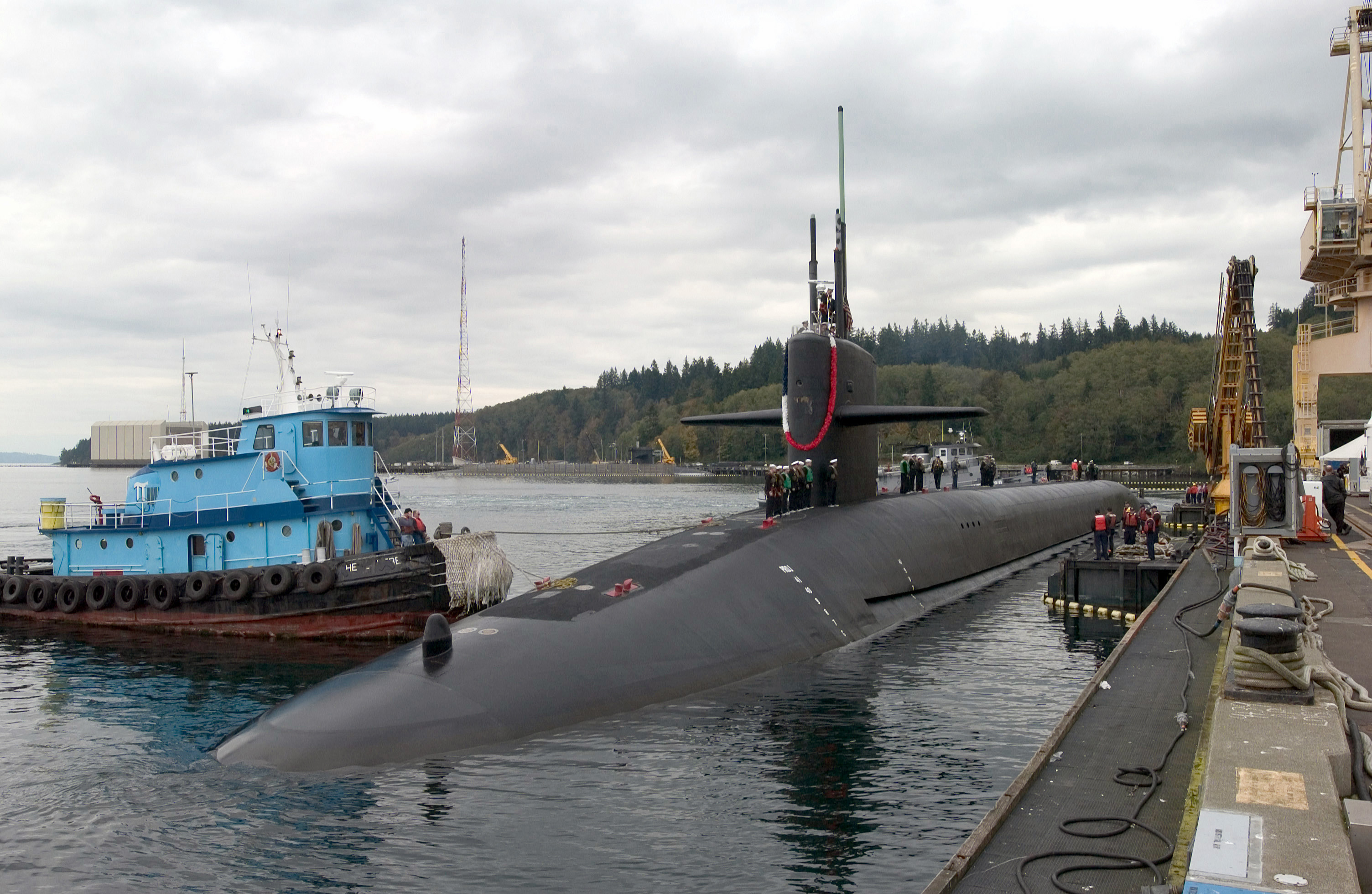
- USS Nebraska (SSBN-739)

History

United States
- Namesake: The U.S. state of Nebraska
- Ordered: 26 May 1987
- Builder: General Dynamics Electric Boat, Groton, Connecticut
- Laid down: 6 July 1987
- Launched: 15 August 1992
- Sponsored by: Patricia Exon
- Commissioned: 10 July 1993
- Home port: Bangor, Washington
- Motto: Defensor Pacis; ("The Defender of Peace")
- Nickname(s): "Big Red"
- Status: in active service
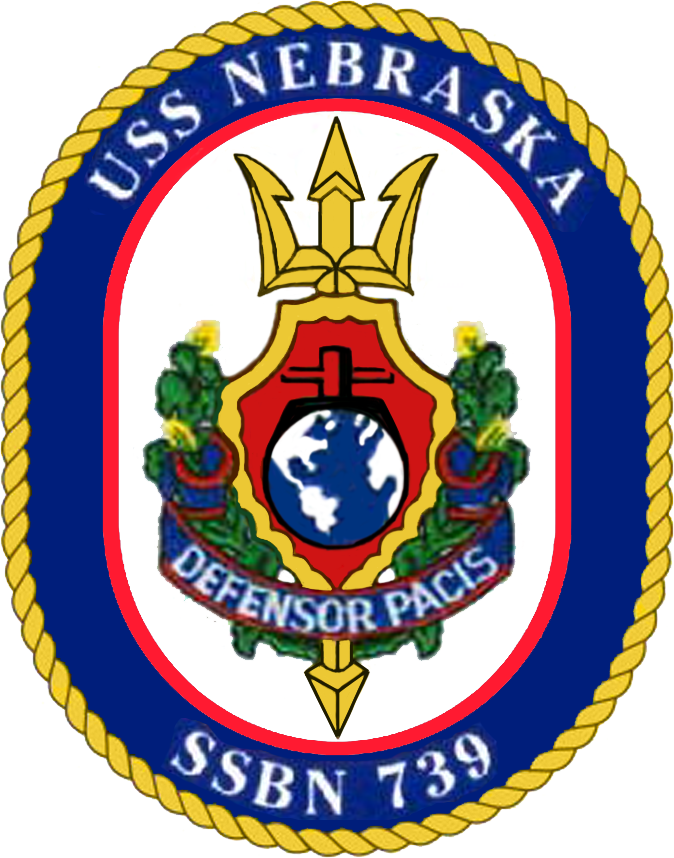
- Badge

General characteristics
- Class & type: Ohio-class ballistic missile submarine
- Displacement: 16,764 long tons (17,033 t) surfaced; 18,750 long tons (19,050 t) submerged
- Length: 560 ft (170 m)
- Beam: 42 ft (13 m)
- Draft: 38 ft (12 m)
- Propulsion: 1 × S8G PWR nuclear reactor (HEU 93.5%); 2 × geared turbines; 1 × 325 hp (242 kW) auxiliary motor; 1 × shaft @ 60,000 shp (45,000 kW)
- Speed: Greater than 25 knots (46 km/h; 29 mph)
- Test depth: Greater than 800 feet (240 m)
- Complement: 15 officers; 140 enlisted
- Armament: MK-48 torpedoes; 20 × Trident II D-5 ballistic missiles

USS Nebraska (hull number SSBN-739) is the 14th Ohio-class ballistic missile submarine, and the second United States Navy vessel to be named in honor of Nebraska, the 37th state. She carries Trident ballistic missiles.

Nebraska shares her nickname, "Big Red", with the University of Nebraska-Lincoln's athletic teams.

== Construction and commissioning ==
The contract to build Nebraska was awarded on 26 May 1987 to the Electric Boat Division of the General Dynamics Corporation at Groton, Connecticut. Her keel was laid there on 6 July 1987 and she was launched on 15 August 1992, sponsored by Patricia Exon, the wife of United States Senator J. James Exon (1921–2005) of Nebraska. Nebraska was delivered to the U.S. Navy on 18 June 1993 and commissioned on 10 July 1993.

== Service history ==
Nebraska was originally assigned to Submarine Group 10 at Naval Submarine Base Kings Bay, Georgia. On 1 October 2004, Nebraska was transferred to Submarine Squadron 17 in Submarine Group 9 at Naval Base Kitsap, Bangor, Washington. In 2013 Nebraska transferred to Submarine Squadron 19 to conduct an Engineering Refueling Overhaul.

The sub has successfully launched Trident missiles for testing six times, once in 1993, in 2004, in 2008, in 2011 in 2018, and in 2019.

As of November 2013, the submarine had completed 62 deterrent patrols during her 20 years of service. Each patrol is usually 77 days in duration followed by 35 days in port for maintenance.

Following Patrol 54, Nebraska was awarded the "Battle E" for Submarine Squadron 17. Additionally, following Patrol 56, the submarine was awarded the "Battle E" for Submarine Squadron 17 for its second consecutive year. After completing an unprecedented 116-day patrol in late 2013, Nebraska was again awarded the "Battle E," her third in four years.

== In popular culture ==
In the military hard science fiction Looking Glass series by John Ringo and Travis S. Taylor, Nebraska is converted into the first human interstellar spaceship and renamed Vorpal Blade. The boat is the main setting for the majority of the second, third, and fourth books in the series, Vorpal Blade, Manxome Foe, and Claws That Catch.

== Related reading ==
- Waller, Douglas C. Big Red: The Three-Month Voyage of a Trident Nuclear Submarine. April 2002
