= Alice in Orchestralia =

1925 novel by Ernest La Prade

Alice in Orchestralia is a 1925 children's novel by American composer and radio producer Ernest La Prade (1889–1969). A girl named Alice visits a symphony concert and, through the portal of a tuba's bell, enters Orchestralia, where a bass viol escorts her and introduces her to a variety of animated musical instruments. In 1934 it was re-issued in a second edition with the title Alice in Orchestra Land. In 1929 La Prade wrote a sequel entitled Marching Notes; in 1952 a British edition of this was published under the title Alice in Music Land.

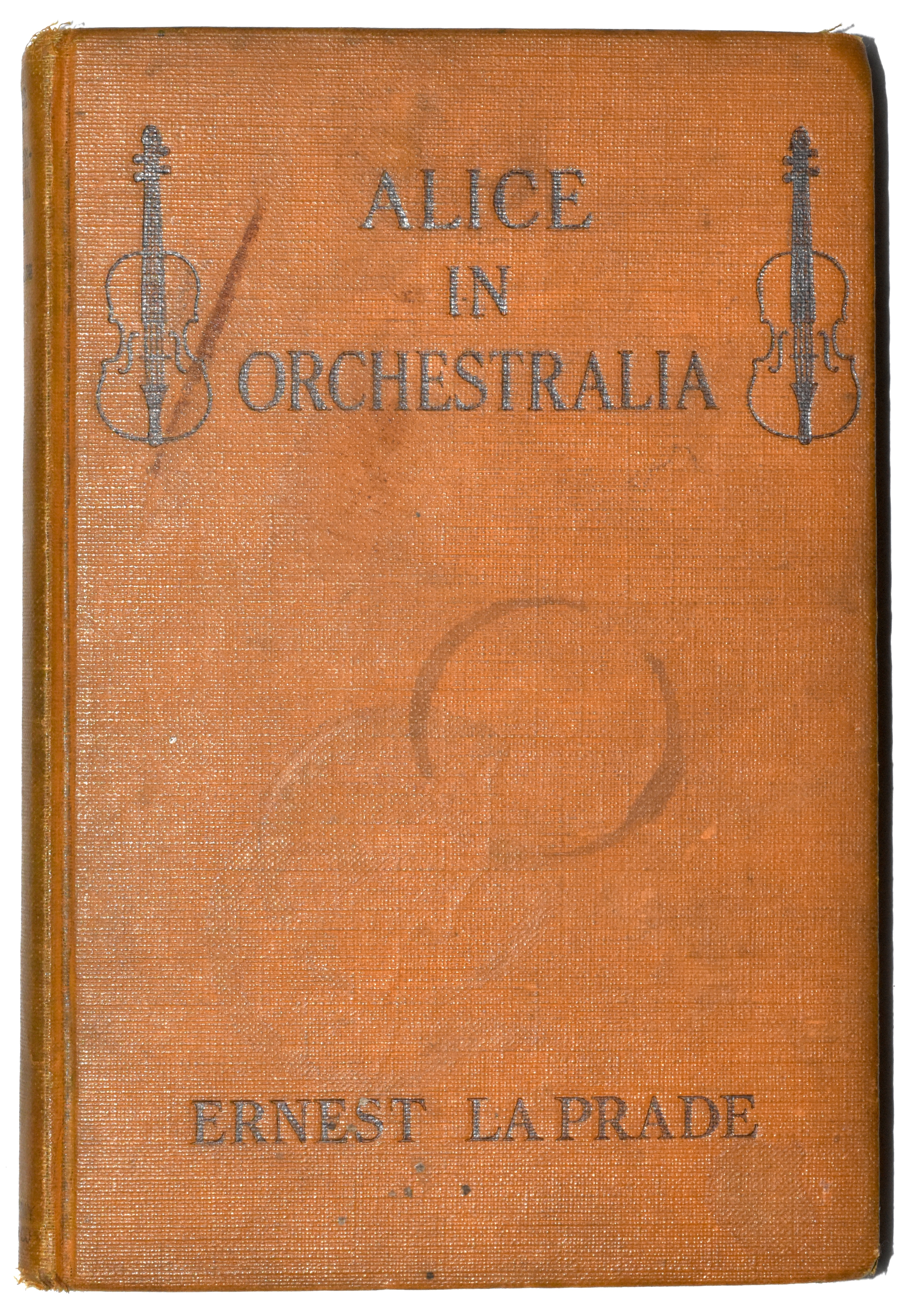
The cover of a 1927 edition of Alice in Orchestralia.

Alice in Orchestralia was also the title of an NBC radio program broadcast on Friday afternoons in the 1930s. Alice in Orchestralia was also issued as a dramatization in an album of three 78 rpm records issued on the Records of Knowledge label (ROK-20) by the Rexford Corp. of New York. Music composed by Don Gillis. Performed by the Rexford Symphony, Ernest La Prada (author of the book), conducting. The cast: Gene Hamilton (narrator), Celia Rotelle (Alice), Leonard Fabian (bass viol), Robert Weil (saxophone), mother (Ann Gerry). Album cover states "Produced and directed under the personal supervision of Nanette Guilford, Metropolitan Opera Star." Issue date of album is unknown, probably in the 1930s or early 1940s.

== See also ==
- Alice's Adventures in Wonderland, 1865 novel by Lewis Carroll
