= Alec Carruthers Gould =

English painter

Alec Carruthers Gould (7 March 1870, Woodford, Essex – 1948) was an English illustrator and landscape and marine painter.

The eldest son of Francis Carruthers Gould, Alec Gould was educated privately by tutors and at Prisca Coborn's school. He studied art at Heatherley's school, Westminster School of Art, and Langham Life Class. He was an illustrator for various newspapers and magazines and several books. For many years he was an illustrator on the staff of the Westminster Gazette. He illustrated Ernest William Hendy's Wild Exmoor through the Year (1930). Gould exhibited Floods out in 1895 and A shady corner on a Dartmoor farm in 1900 at the Royal Academy. He also exhibited at a number of other galleries, notably the Royal Institute of Painters in Watercolours, the Royal Institute of Painters in Oil, the New English Art Club and the Royal Society of British Artists, where he was a member and a prolific contributor.

About the year 1923 Gould contributed a 1 1/4 inch by 1 1/2 inch landscape painting to Queen Mary's Dolls' House.
