= New Adventures of Alice =

1917 novel by John Rae

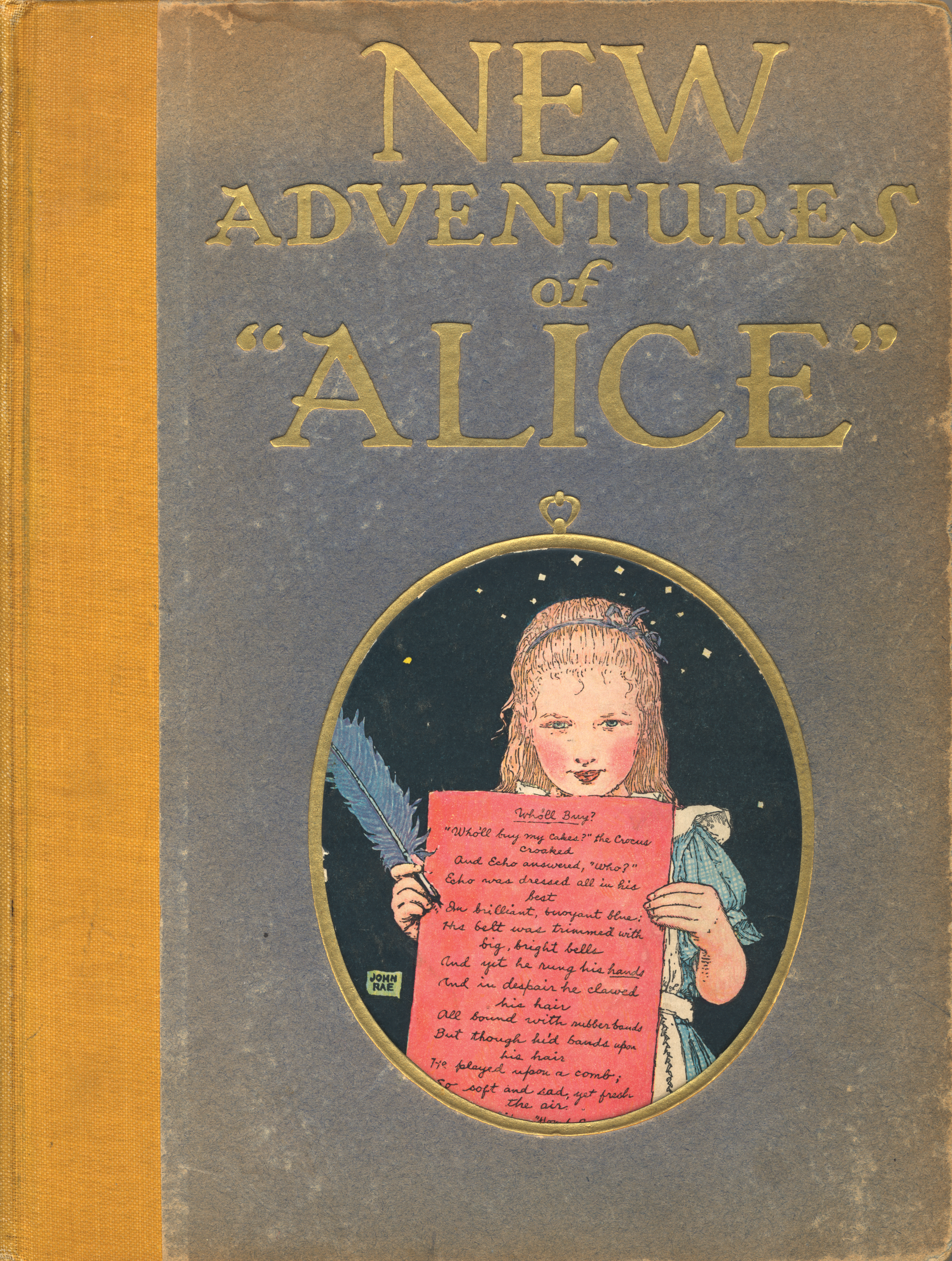
- First edition cover of New Adventures of Alice
- Author: John Rae
- Language: English
- Genre: Fantasy novel
- Publisher: P. F. Volland
- Publication date: 1917
- Publication place: United States
- Media type: Print (Hardback & Paperback)
- Pages: 160 p.

New Adventures of Alice is a novel by John Rae, written in 1917 and published by P. F. Volland of Chicago. It is, according to Carolyn Sigler, one of the more important "Alice imitations", or novels inspired by Lewis Carroll's Alice books and is one of the earliest known examples of fan fiction.

The book opens with a little girl, Betsy, wishing for another Alice book. She passes into a dream, and finds in the attic a book which begins with Alice reading Mother Goose rhymes to her kittens, leading to further adventures.

The book features black-and-white line drawings as well as colour plates by the author, who was known for his portraits of Carl Sandburg and Albert Einstein.

== Bibliography ==
- Rae, John (2010) New Adventures of Alice. Evertype. ISBN 978-1-904808-53-4

== Notes ==
- New Adventures of Alice public domain audiobook at LibriVox
