= Gladys in Grammarland =

1897 novel by Audrey Mayhew Allen

- First edition cover of Gladys in Grammarland
- Author: Audrey Mayhew Allen
- Language: English
- Genre: Fantasy novel
- Publisher: Roxburghe Press
- Publication date: c. 1897
- Publication place: United Kingdom
- Media type: Print (Hardback)
- Pages: 48

Gladys in Grammarland is a novel by Audrey Mayhew Allen, written c. 1897 and published by the Roxburghe Press of Westminster. It is an educational imitation of Lewis Carroll's 1865 book Alice's Adventures in Wonderland.

2010 edition cover of Gladys in Grammarland

In this story, Gladys becomes sleepy after class and finds that a Verb Fairy has taken an interest in her education. She is taken, through a cardboard door with "English Grammar" written on it, into Grammarland, where she meets with a great many Verbs, who explain the concepts of transitivity and intransitivity to her. She is tried at court for using bad grammar, and imprisoned, where she studies some grammar. At length she is released and tried to mediate a dispute between King Proper Noun and King Common Noun.

Gladys in Grammarland is one of a class of books called a "didactic imitation" by Carolyn Sigler.

Audrey Mayhew Allen was born in 1870, and so was about 27 years of age when she wrote Gladys in Grammarland. She was the granddaughter of Henry Mayhew, one of the two founders (1841) of the satirical and humorous magazine Punch, and of Douglas William Jerrold, a dramatist and writer.

The book features a number of line-drawings by an artist credited as "Claudine".

== Bibliography ==
- Allen, Audrey Mayhew (2010) Gladys in Grammarland. Evertype. ISBN 978-1-904808-57-2
