= Pollen (novel) =

1995 novel by Jeff Noon

- First edition UK cover
- Author: Jeff Noon
- Cover artist: Joe Magee
- Language: English
- Series: Vurt series
- Genre: Science fiction
- Publisher: Ringpull
- Publication date: 1995
- Publication place: Great Britain
- Media type: Print (Paperback)
- Pages: 327
- ISBN: 1-85702-398-6
- Preceded by: Vurt
- Followed by: Automated Alice

Pollen is a 1995 science fiction novel written by British author Jeff Noon.

== Plot summary ==
Pollen is the sequel to Vurt and concerns the ongoing struggle between the real world and the virtual world. When concerning the virtual world, some references to Greek mythology are noticeable, including Persephone and Demeter, the river Styx and Charon, and Hades (portrayed by the character John Barleycorn). The novel is set in Manchester.

== Influences ==
Noon is said to take his inspiration from music. While working on Pollen, he often listened to ‘Dream of a 100 Nations’ album by Transglobal Underground on repeat.

Things changed for my second novel, Pollen: by then I had really discovered the melancholic joys of house and techno music, and I think the novel reflects that change. Pollen is a much more tangled book, more fertile, a very overgrown, edge-of-wilderness narrative.

== Songs mentioned ==
- "John Barleycorn (Must Die)"
- "I Can Hear The Grass Grow"
- "Keep on Running"
- "Are You Lonesome Tonight?"
- "Blue Suede Shoes"
- "A Day In The Life"
- "Purple Haze"
- "Hippy Gumbo"
- "Strawberry Fields"
- "Have You Seen Your Mother, Baby (Standing In The Shadows)"
- "Riders on The Storm"
- Piper at the Gates of Dawn (album)
