= Voyage of the Space Bubble =

Military novel series created by John Ringo

- 1. Into the Looking Glass; 2. Vorpal Blade; 3. Manxome Foe; 4. Claws That Catch
- Author: John Ringo
- Country: United States
- Language: English
- Genre: Fiction, science,
- Publisher: Baen Books
- Published: March 27, 2007 – November 24, 2009 (initial publication)
- Media type: Print (hardback & paperback); E-book
- No. of books: 4

The Looking Glass, or Voyage of the Space Bubble, series is a military novel series created by author John Ringo and centering on the creation of trans-space portals known as "looking glasses" (due to their mirror-like appearance) and the effect their discovery and the discovery of things via the portals have on life on Earth and off it. Ringo wrote the first book in the series alone, and has collaborated with physicist and author Travis S. Taylor beginning with the second book in the series. Book titles in the series are phrases taken from the poem Jabberwocky.

== Series ==
This series begins with the cataclysmic creation of a system for opening portals to other places in this universe. Alien contacts and conflicts (both friendly and non-friendly) form the basis of the story and provide a look at the idea that being a hero requires more than just muscles and guns.

Works in the series are:

1. John Ringo, Into the Looking Glass (Baen Books, 2005) ISBN 9780743498807
2. John Ringo and Travis Taylor, Vorpal Blade (Baen Books, 2007) ISBN 9781416555865
3. John Ringo and Travis Taylor, Manxome Foe (Baen Books, 2008) ISBN 9781416591658
4. John Ringo and Travis Taylor, Claws That Catch (Baen Books, 2009) ISBN 9781416555872

=== Into the Looking Glass ===
Into the Looking Glass
- Author: John Ringo
- Language: English
- Series: Voyage of the Space Bubble
- Genre: Military science fiction
- Publisher: Baen Books
- Publication date: March 27, 2007
- Publication place: United States
- ISBN: 0-7434-9880-1
- OCLC: 58055133
- Dewey Decimal: 813/.6 22
- LC Class: PS3618.I545 I58 2005
- Followed by: Vorpal Blade

Into the Looking Glass by John Ringo is the first novel in the series. The book was released on March 27, 2007 from Baen Books. The story introduces travel through portals called looking glasses, the discovery of other worlds, and the aliens that inhabit them.

The novel begins with a large explosion at the University of Central Florida's science department, destroying everything within a mile of it. Investigators find a mysterious sphere suspended in midair above a crater at the center of the blast. Physicist Dr. William Weaver is called in for advice, and Weaver explains that Ray Chen, a physicist at the university, was working on changing the laws of physics within a small space to allow him to create a Higgs Boson, essentially a particle containing its own universe. A new type of flat, traversable anomaly that comes to be called "Looking Glasses" begins to appear around the country, then around the world. While on the site, a little girl named Mimi comes walking out of rubble a few blocks from the explosion, carrying a giant spider on her shoulder. They discover that the spider on her shoulder is an incredibly intelligent being that seems to have formed a telepathic link with Mimi, as he is able to communicate thoughts to her without speaking.

Deadly new species begins to emerge through some of the gates, killing people and spreading a fungus-analogue organism that devours organic substance in its path, and resistant to most chemical and physical containment measures. Weaver and SEAL Command Master Chief Miller are among the response to a panicked call about 'demons'. Other Looking Glasses open to worlds with hostile environments and set off panic about planet-wide ecological collapse. Mankind makes friendly contact with a felinoid species, the Mree. The Mree representative explains that the hostile aliens, the T!Ch!R! in the Mree language, are a pest that seem to go with the gates. Humans pronounce the word as Titcher. They continue a war with the Titcher.

Another race is contacted through yet another gate. The Adar are ahead of humans in technological development. The Adar are friendly with humans upon first contact. They have had trouble with the Titcher, which they call the Dreen because of the howl of one of the fighting units. Humans soon adopt this name. The Dreen have begun to overwhelm human defenses at every gate they have access to once more by the time human and Adar governments establish solid enough contact to allow mutual understanding. The Adar provide humans with a weapon that can close the Dreen Looking Glasses, but if it goes off on the Earth side, it will destroy the planet. After the Mree prove to be a Dreen feint, the U.S. army attacks Mree forces near that Looking Glass to draw them away. Weaver and a SEAL team in temperamental powered combat armor suits deploy the Adar bomb through the unguarded gate. It and the other Dreen Looking Glasses close.

Military forces eventually overwhelm remaining Dreen forces. A few Mree and members of another Dreen slave race are taken prisoner. There is no food on Earth that can provide the nutrients they need. The Mree choose suicide over starvation. The Adar give Weaver a small black box that has an interesting effect when exposed to electricity - having the properties of exponentially increasing the output of energy based on the energy provided to it. Its other properties are explored in sequels.

=== Vorpal Blade ===
In dealing with the Looking Glasses, humanity has discovered precisely one friendly species; the Adar. About a hundred years in advance of humanity, the Adar have had all sorts of problems with the hostile entity known as the Dreen and their slave races. With the discovery of an ally, Humanity looks forward to a brighter future. As a gift, the Adar offer Humanity a small black box that they discovered on a distant world. Enigmatic and plain, the box appears to be a terrifying weapon until Dr. William Weaver discovers that it is in fact a hyperdrive which, when grafted to the former SSBN U.S.S. Nebraska creates the first Warp Ship, the Alliance Space Ship Vorpal Blade.

Vorpal Blade tells the story of Humanity's first voyage into interstellar space and the hazards they encounter there, such as the Mecha-eating Crabpus, the gravitational standing waves between solar systems, or the Demons of Cheerick the crew encounter. The Marines and SF contingent of the Vorpal Blade must deal with those issues while still vomiting from the pink maulk in the pre-mission physical.

=== Manxome Foe ===
An archeological expedition located on another planet, reachable through the Looking Glass portals, was attacked and destroyed, presumably by the Dreen. As per protocol, an Ardune warhead was sent through the gate destabilizing it. Now the crew of the Vorpal Blade must find out what happened, if it was the Dreen and if they are colonizing the local systems. Despite the fact that it takes a month to get there with pre-mission physical in route, the crew is put up against unimaginable odds, making a new ally, and discovering the Dreen's plan for Earth.

=== Claws That Catch ===
During their escape from the Dreen, the Hexosehr discovered a planet with ancient ruins, containing an inactive 'black box.' Sent out to make sure the Dreen don't get it and any other advanced technology, the Vorpal Blade II goes on this mission in a new ship with a new CO. The veterans of the Blade must teach the new soldiers all the common sense they need to survive, as well as the Cheerick fighters they're training. On their arrival, they discover a great secret in some odd encounters.
