= Automated Alice =

1996 novel by Jeff Noon

- Author: Jeff Noon
- Illustrator: Harry Trumbore
- Language: English
- Series: Vurt series
- Genre: Steampunk
- Publisher: Doubleday
- Publication date: 1996
- Publication place: Great Britain
- Media type: Print (Paperback & Hardback)
- ISBN: 978-0-385-40808-0 (first edition, paperback)
- OCLC: 37155563
- Preceded by: Pollen
- Followed by: Nymphomation

Automated Alice is a fantasy novel by British author Jeff Noon, first published in 1996. The book follows Alice's travels to a future Manchester city populated by Newmonians, Civil Serpents and a vanishing cat and more.

The book was written as both the third book in the Vurt series and the "trequel" to the famous Lewis Carroll books, Alice's Adventures in Wonderland (1865) and Through the Looking-Glass (1871).

== Plot summary ==
The story of Automated Alice tells of the character of Alice from Lewis Carroll's books in a future version of Manchester, England. After following her Great Aunt Ermintrude's parrot Whippoorwill through a grandfather clock, Alice and Alice's doll Celia get lost in a world inhabited by Newmonians, entities made from two objects combined, for example a zebra and a human.

== Characters ==
- Alice

== Reception ==
Paul Pettengale reviewed Automated Alice for Arcane magazine, rating it a 6 out of 10 overall, and stated that "I suspect that Noon is making some comment or other about society, or something equally as profound. Maybe I'm right, quite possibly I'm wrong, but if he is, it was lost on me. His latest book reads like a children's story with some grown-up words thrown in, and while enjoyable, it certainly doesn't possess the same grip on the reader that his previous two novels do. I kept on expecting someone to pull a Vurt feather from their mouth and for the plot to come crashing down to Noon's twisted vision of a future reality. Instead, Alice finds her way home and everyone lives happily ever after. Which can't be right, surely? Unless, that is, Jeff Noon is merely playing games with his devout audience and Automated Alice is no more that a story he wanted to write."

== Reviews ==
- Review by Faren Miller (1996) in Locus, #430 November 1996
- Review by L. J. Hurst (1997) in Vector 193
- Review by Ken Brown (1997) in Interzone, August 1997
- Review by Paul Di Filippo (1997) in Asimov's Science Fiction, September 1997
- Review by Steve Sneyd (1997) in The Zone and Premonitions, Winter 1997-98
- Review by Paul J. McAuley (1997) in Foundation, #70 Summer 1997
- Review by Colin Steele (2001) in SF Commentary, #77
