= Jeff Noon =

British writer (born 1957)

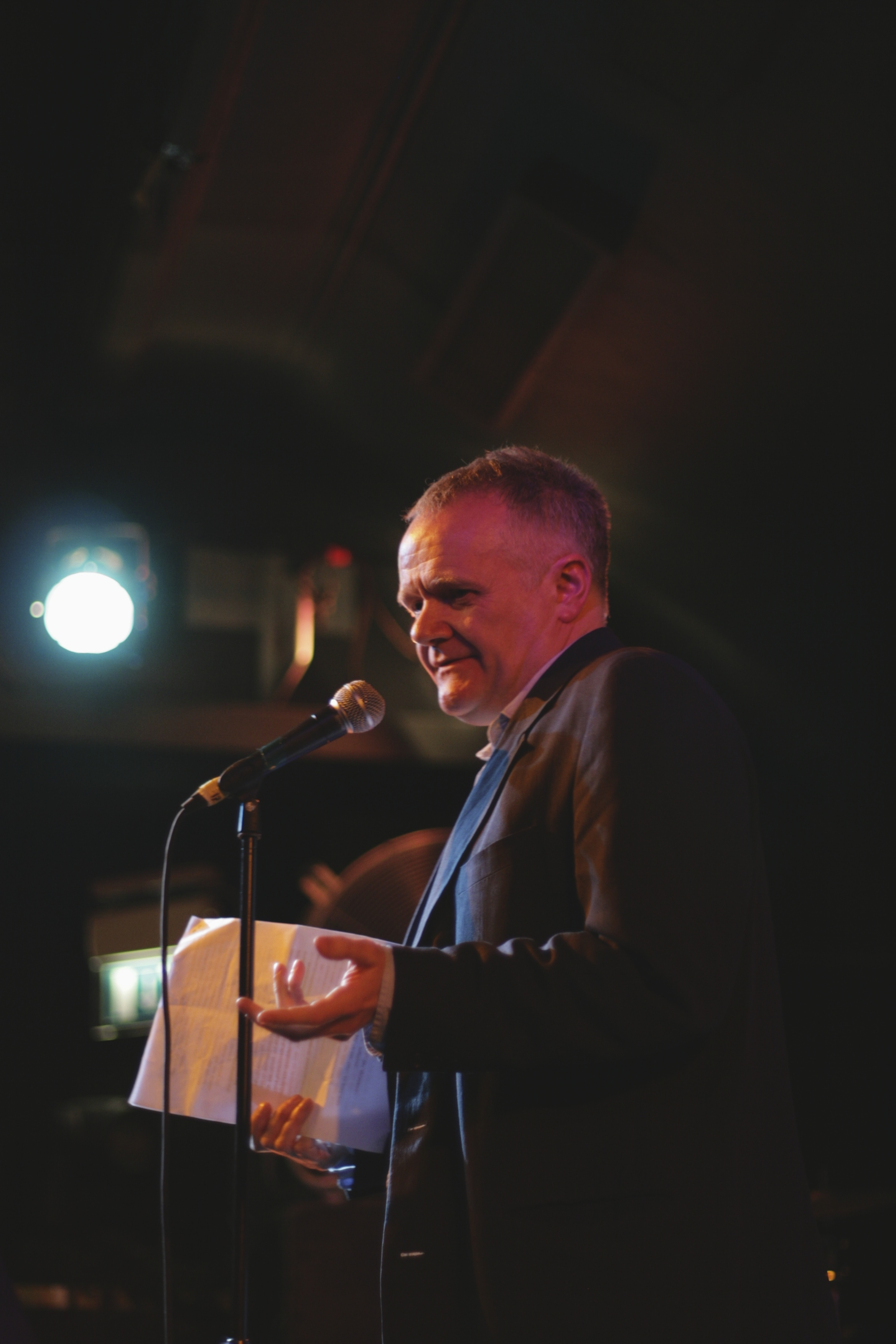
- Born: 1957 (age 68–69); Droylsden, Lancashire, England
- Occupations: Novelist, playwright, screenwriter, musician, painter
- Writing career
- Notable work: Vurt series
- Website: jeffnoon.weebly.com

Jeff Noon (born 1957 in Droylsden, Lancashire, England) is a British novelist, short story writer and playwright whose works make use of word play and fantasy. Noon's speculative fiction books have ties to the works of writers such as Lewis Carroll and Jorge Luis Borges. Prior to his relocation in 2000 to Brighton, Noon set most of his stories in some version of his native city of Manchester.

== Novels ==
Noon's first four novels, which share ongoing characters and settings, are commonly referred to as the 'Vurt series' (after the first novel). Although the fictional chronology leads from Automated Alice to Nymphomation to Vurt to Pollen, the books were originally published as Vurt (1993), Pollen (1995), Automated Alice (1996), and Nymphomation (1997). (Automated Alice connects the series to the fictional world of Lewis Carroll), serving as a 'trequel' [sic] to Carroll's Alice's Adventures in Wonderland and Through the Looking-Glass )

=== Vurt (1993) ===
Vurt tells the story of Scribble and his "gang" the Stash Riders as they search for his missing sister Desdemona. Vurt refers to a drug/shared alternate reality that is accessed by sucking on colour-coded feathers. Through some (never explained) mechanism, the dreams, mythology, and imaginings of humanity achieved objective reality in the Vurt and became "real". The book won the 1994 Arthur C. Clarke Award.

=== Pollen (1995) ===
Pollen is the sequel to Vurt and concerns the ongoing struggle between the real world and the vurtual world. When concerning the "vurtual" world, some references to Greek mythology are noticeable, including Persephone and Demeter, the river Styx and Charon, and Hades (portrayed by the character John Barleycorn).

=== Automated Alice (1996) ===
Noon describes Automated Alice as a "trequel" – it is a companion piece of sorts to Lewis Carroll's books Alice's Adventures in Wonderland and Through the Looking-Glass. The novella follows Alice's journey to a future Manchester populated by Newmonians, Civil Serpents and a vanishing cat named Quark.

The people who suffer from newmonia (pronounced the same as the real condition pneumonia), are hybrids of humans and other entities. They are mainly hybrids of animals and humans, but also of other random items such as kitchen sinks and pianos.

The civil serpents (a play-on-words of the job 'civil servant') are trying to control everything that happens in the future, and try to stop randomness. The 'Supreme Serpent' is the controller of the serpents, and hints at the fact that he is Satan himself. The writing style of Noon is very similar to that of Lewis Carroll, who Noon constantly refers back to during the novel. The narrative is full of Alice mis-hearing words, most notably worm instead of wurm, and pneumonia instead of newmonia.

There are also references to popular musical figures, with two notable characters. Firstly, James Marshall Hentrails, a sculpture made of rubbish, and who contains the insides (entrails) of a hen. This character is obviously a reference to Jimi Hendrix. The character also sings a song while playing the guitar. The song is titled 'Little Miss Bonkers', a reference to 'Little Miss Strange' by Hendrix.

Secondly, the character of Long Distance Davis, whom Alice meets in a police cell, is a reference to jazz musician and trumpet player Miles Davis.

=== Nymphomation (1997) ===
Nymphomation is the prequel to Vurt. Nymphomation primarily tells the story of a lottery in Manchester involving dominos and a group attempting to crack the secrets of that lottery, but it also sets the background for much of the mythology found in the previous three books.

=== Pixel Juice (1998) ===
Pixel Juice is a collection of fifty short stories.

=== Needle in the Groove (2000) ===
Needle in the Groove follows Elliot Hill, a bass player and ex-junkie trudging the pub-rock circuit, who is invited to join a new band: fusing DJ artistry, voice and rhythm section, the group's hypnotic groove creation is augmented by a startling new recording technology. The band seems bound for success – until one of them vanishes. Elliot's subsequent search draws him into a secret history of music that stretches back forty years and into his own past. Jeff Noon and David Toop also released a CD, Needle in the Groove: if music were a drug, where would it take you, on Sulphur Records in the same year.

=== Cobralingus (2001) ===
Cobralingus sits apart from Noon's other published works. It is part poetry collection and part instructional textbook for Noon's style of poetry. In it, he details his regimented methods for the creation of poetic text by a style of word play which lends its name to the title. Also included are various exemplars of this style.

The Engine begins with Noon using an existing text and then applying different 'filter gates' that edit the text into something new. Examples of these gates include 'enhance' which creates elements of beauty in the text, and 'ghost edit'; this kills the text and calls up a ghost to haunt the text.

The Codex edition of the book was illustrated by Daniel Allington and has an introduction by Michael Bracewell, explaining the Cobralingus Engine.

=== Falling out of Cars (2002) ===
Falling out of Cars is a road novel set in a near-future world where information-based civilization is falling apart. It follows the journey of Marlene, Henderson, and Peacock as they drive around England on a mission to gather fragments of a mirror that may be at the heart of the world's affliction. Falling out of Cars is the record Marlene keeps – or tries to keep – of her quest to flee from her past. Despite her daily dose of Lucidity, Marlene is gradually succumbing to the malady, and it gets harder and harder to distinguish dream from reality, hallucinations from events.

=== 217 Babel Street (2008) ===
217 Babel Street was a collaborative project between four authors, Susanna Jones, Alison MacLeod, William Shaw and Noon. Only published online, this collection of short stories is set in a fictional British apartment building and features stories about the lives of each inhabitant, to which each author contributed. No longer available online.

=== Channel SK1N (2012) ===
Channel SK1N follows popstar Nola Blue on a journey of transformation as she begins to pick up signals on her skin. It was published as a DRM-free ebook.

== Bibliography ==
=== Novels and novellas ===
==== Vurt series ====
- Vurt (1993), ISBN 1-898051-03-8
- Pollen (1995), ISBN 1-898051-11-9
- Automated Alice (1996), ISBN 0-385-40808-0
- Nymphomation (1997), ISBN 0-385-40812-9

==== Nyquist Mysteries ====
- A Man of Shadows (2017), ISBN 085766669X
- The Body Library (2018), ISBN 0857666738
- Creeping Jenny (2020), ISBN 9780857668400
- Within Without (2021), ISBN 9780857668981

==== Chronicles of Ludwich ====
- Gogmagog (2024) – co-written with Steve Beard, ISBN 978-1915202826
- Ludluda (2024) – co-written with Steve Beard, ISBN 978-1915998316

==== Others ====
- Needle in the Groove (2000), ISBN 1-86230-091-7
- Falling Out of Cars (2002), ISBN 0-385-60296-0
- Channel SK1N (2012), ASIN: B008RZD9ZI
- Slow Motion Ghosts (2019), ISBN 0857525611
- Moon Over Brendle (2026), ISBN 9781836730309

=== Short fiction collections ===
- Pixel Juice (1998), ISBN 0-385-40859-5
- Cobralingus (2001), ISBN 1-899598-16-2
- Mappalujo (2002) – co-written with Steve Beard, currently only available online
- 217 Babel Street (2008) – co-written with Susanna Jones, Alison MacLeod and William Shaw, originally only available online, now no longer available

=== Plays ===
- Woundings (1986), ISBN 1-870259-00-9
- Vurt – The Theatre Remix (May 2000- the show ran for three weeks)
- Somewhere The Shadow (May 2001- the show ran from Thursday 3 May – Saturday 26 May)
- The Modernists (June 2003- the show ran from Wednesday 11 June – Saturday 21 June)

=== Radio work ===
- Dead Code – Ghosts of the Digital Age (BBC Radio 3, 2005) – incidental music by The Durutti Column

=== Film ===
- Woundings (based on the play), known as Brand New World (USA) (1998)

=== Reported works in progress ===
A film adaptation of Creeping Zero was expected to go into production in 2012. It may come to screens sometime in the future. The feature was based on the short story of the same name published in Pixel Juice. The film was to be directed by Billy O' Brien (director and writer of Isolation (film))

On 28 August 2011, Noon began a Twitter account where he posts what he has described as "Micro Spores" from the Twitter ID @jeffnoon.

Jeff also publishes "microfictions" set in Sparkletown under the pseudonym @temp_user9.
