= Nanette Guilford =

American musician, singer and opera singer

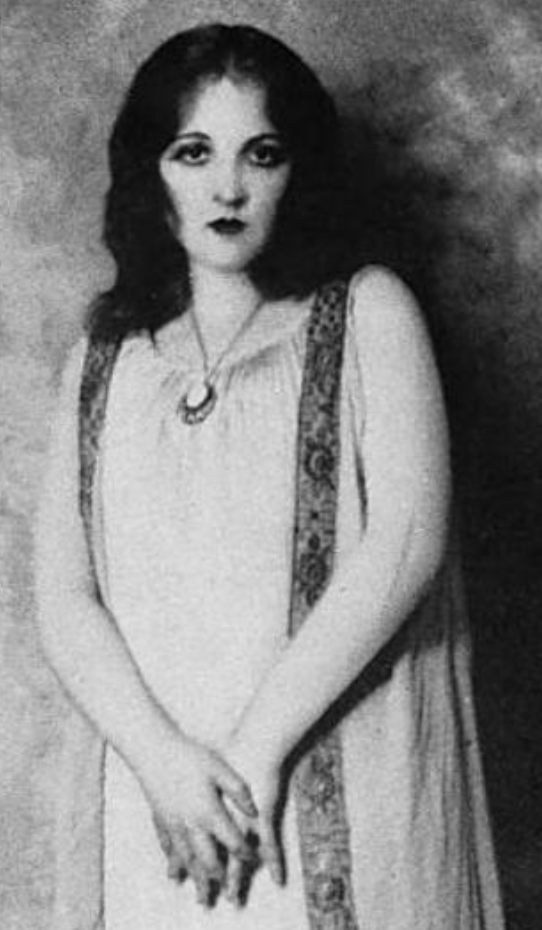
- Nanette Guilford, from a 1929 publication
- Born: Nanette Gutman; August 17, 1903; Harlem, New York, U.S.
- Died: March 17, 1990 (age 86); New York, U.S.
- Occupations: Opera vocalist, voice teacher, music producer

Nanette Guilford (August 17, 1903 – March 17, 1990), born Nanette Gutman, was an American opera singer (soprano), voice teacher and recording entrepreneur. She is best known for singing at the Metropolitan Opera House from 1923 to 1932 and as one of the first American singers to establish operatic career without studying in Europe. She produced music for the Girl Scouts of America.

== Life ==
Nanette Guilford, named at birth Nanette Gutman, was born in Harlem, New York on 17 August 1903. She was singing musical comedies at the age of 13 and at 18. She studied privately with Albert Jeannote and in 1921 started her musical theater career in a musical The Midnignt Rounders of 1921 at the Century Promenade theater.

In 1928 Guilford married Max Rosen, who was a recognized concert violinist of the first rank. The couple knew each other for three years before marriage and were engaged for six months keeping secret the news of the engagement to escape publicity. Guilford and Rosen made recordings together. The marriage was over after fifteen months, in 1930 when Guilford filled the suit for divorce on the grounds of incompatibility of temperament.

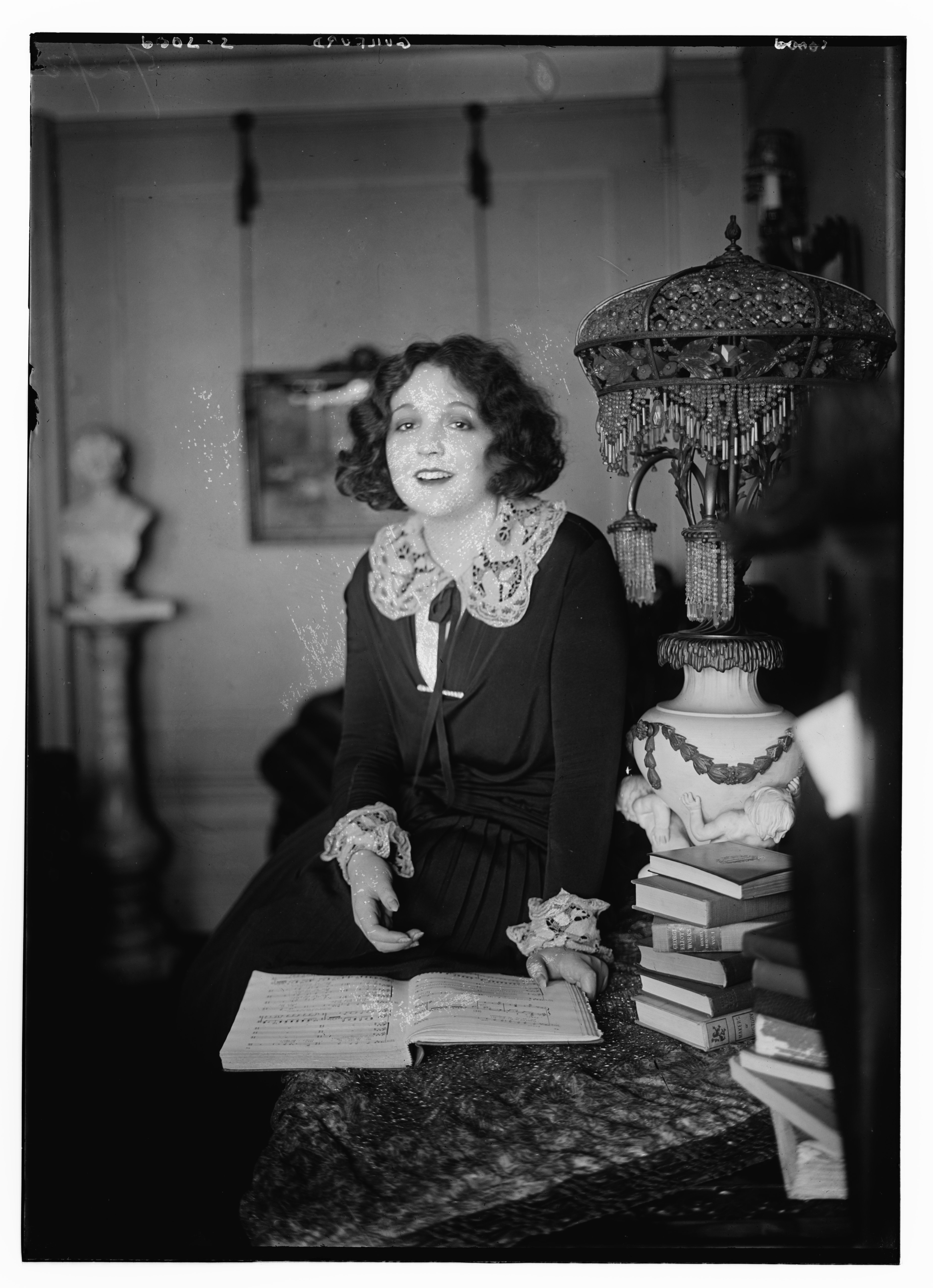
Nanette Guilford

Nanette Guilford died of an intestinal infection on 17 March 1990 at St. Vincent Hospital in New York City. She was 86 years old.

== Career ==
=== Metropolitan Opera ===
In May 1923 Guilford signed her first contract with the Metropolitan Opera. Her debut was in a minor role in Rigoletto. She sang small roles until March 1926, when she appeared as Ginerva in La Cena Delle Beffe by Umberto Giordano. Other sources claim that her first prima donna role was in Giordano's The Jest, after which she was known as the “baby star” of the Met. Guilford was called “the baby star” because when signing her first contract with the Metropolitan Opera, she wrote that she was 18 years old. Among her other roles at the Met are Aida, Liu in Turandot and Musetta in La Boheme. The audience greeted cordially her scenes with Gigli, Tibbett, Miss Dalossy and the others heard previously. Guilford left the Met in 1932 and after that sang at Cosmopolitan Opera House.

=== Broadway ===
In May 1934 Guilford was rehearsing a musical show called Caviar. A musical romance, Caviar opened on 7 June 1934 and was on at Forest Theatre till 23 June. Guilford sang in Caviar the principal role of Elena, who wanted to marry a Russian prince solely because of his title, but finally felt in love with him. Caviar managed less than three weeks on Broadway. Despite the strong voice of Guilford, it was received by critics as a quick failure.

=== Nanette Guilford Corporation ===
In the 1960s Guilford produced music under the label Nanette Guilford Corporation. Among others she produced music for the Girl Scouts of America.
