= Alice in Verse: The Lost Rhymes of Wonderland =

2010 novel by J.T. Holden

- Author: J.T. Holden
- Illustrator: Andrew Johnson
- Cover artist: Andrew Johnson
- Language: English
- Genre: Fantasy novel
- Publisher: Candleshoe Books
- Publication date: 11 January 2010
- Media type: Print (Hardcover)
- Pages: 112 pp
- ISBN: 978-0-9825089-9-2
- OCLC: 496519382

Alice in Verse: The Lost Rhymes of Wonderland (2010) is a reimagining of Lewis Carroll's 1865 novel Alice's Adventures in Wonderland written by British-American author J.T. Holden. It tells the story of Alice's Adventures in Wonderland (with a "Slight Detour Through the Looking-Glass") in 19 rhyming poems, each written in the same style as Lewis Carroll's original verse. The book includes 36 illustrations by American artist Andrew Johnson.

== Synopsis ==
What distinguishes this variation on Lewis Carroll's classic from others is that the story is told entirely in rhyming verse. It begins the same as Carroll's original, with a languid Alice perking up "When first she spies the clock of clocks/Within the rabbit's paw". After following the time-obsessed creature Down the Rabbit-Hole Again, she discovers The Bottle & the Biscuit Box in the "hall of many doors," and after drinking and shrinking and eating and growing (and shrinking again), she is "swept away upon a pool of tears." The first real departure from the original text comes in the 3rd verse, where, after being instructed by the Caterpillar in proper Wonderland speech (The Caterpillar's Lesson on Rhetoric & Rhyme), she is given the chance to impress the imperious insect with her oratory skills in The Mariner's Tale, a dark poem more akin to How Doth the Little Crocodile than the You Are Old, Father William poem she quoted for the Caterpillar in Carroll's original book. The Caterpillar gives his earnest (if somewhat slanted) critique of her recital in the 5th verse (The Subjective Review) before taking flight on mechanical wings (as depicted in the accompanying illustration). The 5th verse finds Alice in familiar company once again with The Cook, the Pig, the Cat & His Duchess, as the Cheshire Cat tells her the tale of the conflict between the Duchess and the Cook, revealing that the pig-babies raised by the Duchess are bred as food for the Queen's banquets.

The most pivotal departure from Carroll's original text comes in the 7th verse, "The Tea Party Resumes", where it is first hinted at (by a sleep-talking Dormouse) that the Knave of Hearts may not in fact be responsible for the theft of the Queen's tarts. Through rapid wordplay and cunning juxtaposition, both the Mad Hatter and March Hare attempt to muddy the facts and confuse Alice — though, the astute reader will glean much from the Dormouse's revelation on the matter of the Queen's missing tarts. The 8th verse, offers a brief respite from the main action with A Slight Detour Through the Looking-Glass, which serves not only as a catchall recap of Carroll's follow up book but also as an introduction to the subsequent three verses: Dee & Dum (the 9th verse) and The Battle (the 11th verse) which function as a wraparound for the 10th verse, The Walrus & the Carpenter Head Back (the epic sequel to Carroll's masterpiece The Walrus and the Carpenter), in which the tables are turned on the title characters "who once dined on the shore".

The 12th verse, In the Garden of Hearts, returns Alice to Wonderland, "where the trial (of the Knave of Hearts) is about to begin!" In the 13th verse (The Trial Begins) the King of Hearts presides over the court just as he did in Chapters 11 & 12 of Alice's Adventures in Wonderland, with the Queen at his side, and the White Rabbit in the role of the court reporter, reading the now famous single stanza verse the Queen of Hearts (a second stanza has been added that only further accentuates the absurdity of the charge against the accused). The major departure from Carroll's original here is that instead of appearing as jittery witnesses, the Mad Hatter and March Hare are cast as Counsel for the Defense and Prosecutor, respectively. After the charge is read, the Hare addresses the court with an opening statement that more or less vindicates the accused, before turning his accusing eye upon the court itself for failing to serve tea with the evidence (the tarts). The King concurs and calls for a brief recess, during which the bulk of the evidence is consumed by all present. The trial resumes in the 14th verse with The Hatter's Defence, in which the Hatter presents an alternately flattering and damning portrait of the accused. In the 15th verse (The Hare's Rebuttal & the Hatter's Rebuke) the jury is making ready to deliberate when the Hare suddenly chimes in again with a counter argument that is more damning to himself and opposing counsel than it is to the accused, and only after a decisive rebuke from the Hatter does the Hare retract his "erroneous rebuttal", at which point the King allows there is "time for yet one final pleading." In the 16th verse The Knave of Hearts Repents with a haunting poetic plea directed specifically at the Queen of Hearts, who offers her own poetic response in the 17th verse The Queen's Sentence. The 18th Verse, The Royal Flush, pandemonium breaks out, much the same as it did in Carroll's original, with Alice challenging the court, while the Hatter and Hare try to trap the Dormouse who has run amok, and the jury takes flight. As the Queen demands "Off with his whiskers! Off with his head!", a voice calls to Alice from just outside her dream. Alice wakes suddenly in the 19th and final verse (Waking), with the events of the previous 18 verses recurring to her in reverse order, like memory folding back over itself, until the final line of the final stanza affirms the sentiment that the rhyming poem is both valid and "well worth defending."

== Reviews ==
- http://www.thechildrensbookreview.com/weblog/2010/04/alice-in-wonderland-j-t-holden-and-andrew-johnson%E2%80%94a-book-in-verse.html#more-5995
- http://www.forewordreviews.com/reviews/alice-in-verse-the-lost-rhymes-of-wonderland/
- http://www.midwestbookreview.com/sbw/mar_10.htm#Poetry
