= Francis Carruthers Gould =

British caricaturist (1844–1925)

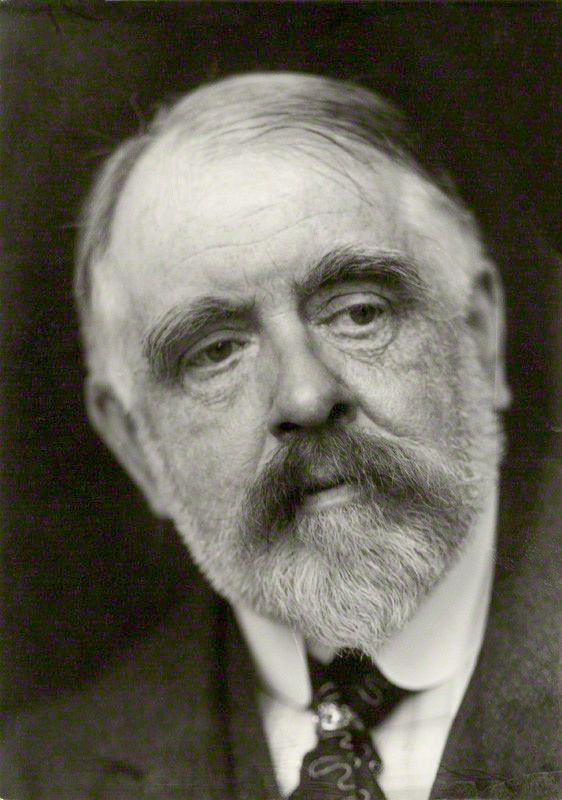
Francis Carruthers Gould by George Charles Beresford, 1902

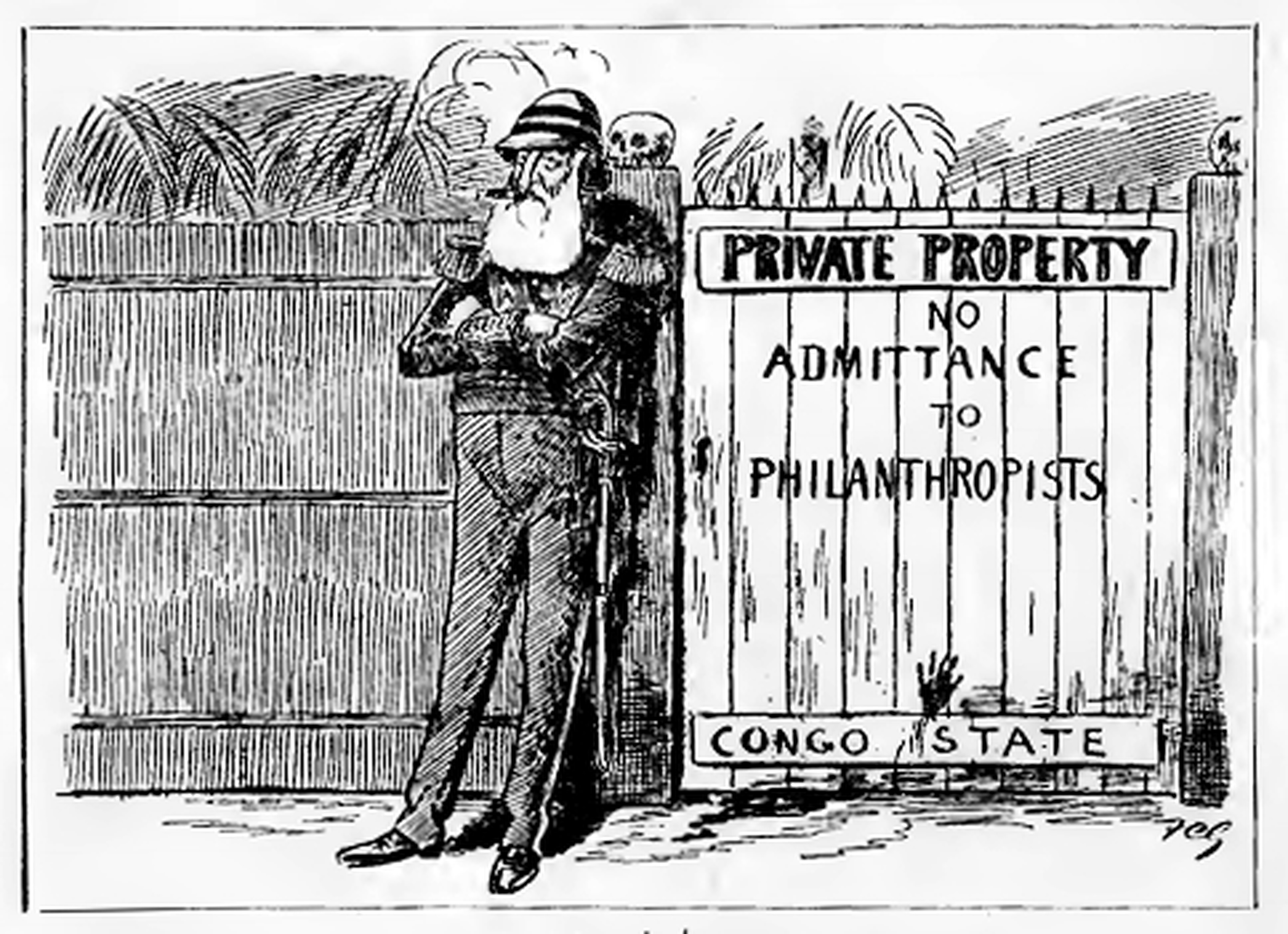
Cartoon by Francis Carruthers Gould depicting King Leopold II, and the Congo Free State

Sir Francis Carruthers Gould (2 December 1844 – 1 January 1925) was a British caricaturist and political cartoonist, born in Barnstaple, Devon. He published as F. Carruthers Gould and signed his cartoons FCG.

== Biography ==
Gould was the son of Richard Davie Gould (c. 1816-1900), a Barnstaple architect, and his wife Judith Carruthers (née Ford). Although in early youth he showed great love of drawing, he began life in a bank and then joined the London Stock Exchange, where he constantly sketched the members and illustrated important events in the financial world; many of these drawings were reproduced by lithography and published for private circulation. In 1879 he began the regular illustration of the Christmas numbers of Truth, and in 1887 he became a contributor to the Pall Mall Gazette, transferring his allegiance to the Westminster Gazette on its foundation and subsequently acting as assistant editor.

Among his independent publications are Who killed Cock Robin? (1897), Tales told in the Zoo (1900), two volumes of Froissart's Modern Chronicles (1902 and 1903), and Picture Politics — a periodical reprint of his Westminster Gazette cartoons, one of the most noteworthy implements of political warfare in the armoury of the Liberal Party. With Sir Wilfrid Lawson he published Cartoons in Rhyme and Line (1905).

Frequently grafting his ideas onto subjects taken freely from Uncle Remus, Alice's Adventures in Wonderland, and the works of Dickens and Shakespeare, Gould used these literary vehicles with extraordinary dexterity and satire. He was knighted in 1906. Unpublished manuscripts and biographical material are in the House of Commons Library historical collections, kept in the House of Lords Record Office.

Carruthers Gould was responsible for designing eleven (11) Toby jugs of World War I political and military figures between 1915 and 1920.

His eldest son, Alexander, became a noted artist.

== Bibliography ==
- Seymour-Ure, Colin: The picture politics of Sir Francis Carruthers Gould : Britain's pioneering political cartoonist, Manchester : Manchester University Press, 2024, ISBN 978-1-5261-8199-2
- Geake, Charles, and F. Carruthers Gould (2010) John Bull's Adventures in the Fiscal Wonderland. Evertype. ISBN 978-1-904808-51-0
- Munro, H. H. (Saki). (1902) The Westminster Alice. Illustrated by F. Carruthers Gould. London: Westminster Gazette.
- Scully, Richard. (2018) Eminent Victorian Cartoonists, Volume III: Heirs and Successors. London: Political Cartoon Society.

== Sources ==
- "Some Men Who Made Barnstaple..." by Pauline Brain 2010 (his family and ancestry).
