= John Bull's Adventures in the Fiscal Wonderland =

1904 novel by Charles Geake and Francis Carruthers Gould

- First edition cover of John Bull's Adventures in the Fiscal Wonderland
- Author: Charles Geake and Francis Carruthers Gould
- Language: English
- Genre: Fantasy novel, parody
- Publisher: Methuen
- Publication date: 1904
- Publication place: United Kingdom
- Media type: Print (hardback)
- Pages: xii, 152

John Bull's Adventures in the Fiscal Wonderland is a novel by Charles Geake and Francis Carruthers Gould, written in 1904 and published by Methuen & Co. of London. It is a political parody of Lewis Carroll's two books, Alice's Adventures in Wonderland (1865) and Through the Looking-Glass (1871).

The book features 48 drawings by Gould, after the originals by John Tenniel.

It is critical of the economic politics of the day, which John Bull tries to make sense of. A number of notable British politicians are identified in the book. Joseph Chamberlain is the Prefferwense, the Mad Hatter, the Cheshire Cat, and the Knave of Hearts; Arthur Balfour is the March Hare and Humpy Dumpy; the Earl of Rosebery is Tweedle-R., Henry Campbell-Bannerman is Twee-C.-B., Jesse Collings is the White Rabbit, and the Duke of Devonshire is the Dormouse.

2010 edition cover of John Bull's Adventures in the Fiscal Wonderland. Arthur Balfour, the Duke of Devonshire, and Joseph Chamberlain are shown with John Bull.

== Editions ==
- 1904 original edition available at the Internet Archive
- 1904 edition in html format
- 2010 modern edition Evertype ISBN 978-1-904808-51-0
