= Henry Campbell-Bannerman =

Prime Minister of the United Kingdom from 1905 to 1908

The Right Honourable Sir Henry Campbell-Bannerman GCB
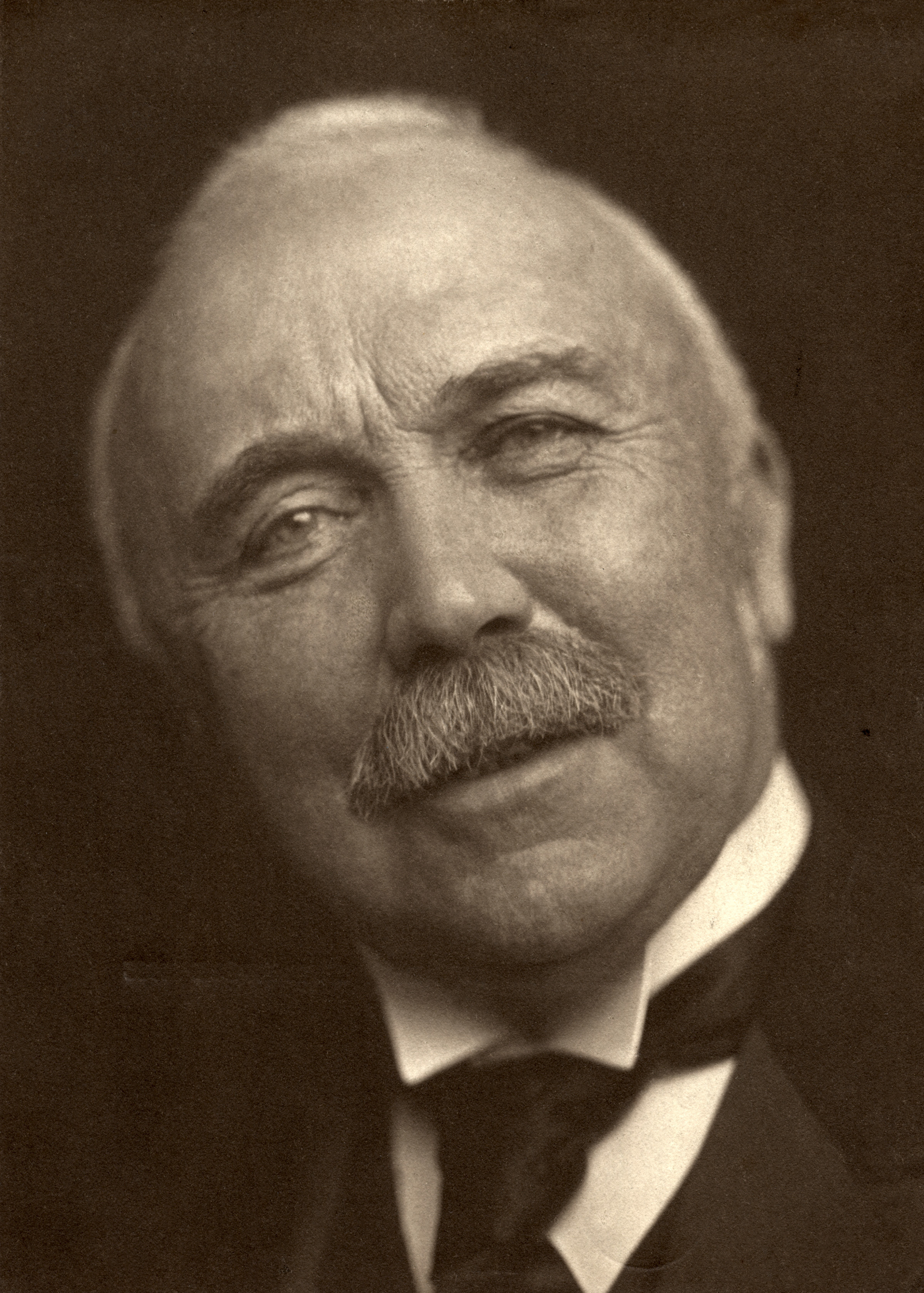
- Portrait by George Charles Beresford, 1902

Prime Minister of the United Kingdom
- In office 5 December 1905 – 3 April 1908
- Monarch: Edward VII
- Preceded by: Arthur Balfour
- Succeeded by: H. H. Asquith
Senior political offices
Leader of the Opposition
In office 6 February 1899 – 5 December 1905
Monarchs	Victoria; Edward VII
Prime Minister	The Marquess of Salisbury; Arthur Balfour
Preceded by	William Vernon Harcourt
Succeeded by	Arthur Balfour
Leader of the Liberal Party
In office 6 February 1899 – 22 April 1908
Preceded by	William Vernon Harcourt
Succeeded by	H. H. Asquith
Ministerial offices
Secretary of State for War
In office 18 August 1892 – 21 June 1895
Prime Minister	William Ewart Gladstone; The Earl of Rosebery
Preceded by	Edward Stanhope
Succeeded by	The Marquess of Lansdowne
In office 6 February 1886 – 20 July 1886
Prime Minister	William Ewart Gladstone
Preceded by	The Viscount Cranbrook
Succeeded by	William Henry Smith
Chief Secretary for Ireland
In office 23 October 1884 – 25 June 1885
Prime Minister	William Ewart Gladstone
Preceded by	George Otto Trevelyan
Succeeded by	William Hart Dyke
Parliamentary offices
Member of Parliament
In office 19 November 1868 – 22 April 1908
Preceded by	John Ramsay
Succeeded by	Arthur Ponsonby
Constituency	Stirling Burghs

Additional positions

Personal details
- Born: Henry Campbell; 7 September 1836 Kelvinside House, Glasgow, Scotland
- Died: 22 April 1908 (aged 71) 10 Downing Street, London, England
- Resting place: Meigle Parish Church, Perthshire
- Party: Liberal
- Spouse: Charlotte Bruce (m. 1860; died 1906)
- Education: The High School of Glasgow; University of Glasgow; Trinity College, Cambridge
- Profession: Merchant

Sir Henry Campbell-Bannerman (né Campbell; 7 September 1836 – 22 April 1908) was Prime Minister of the United Kingdom from 1905 to 1908 and Leader of the Liberal Party from 1899 to 1908. He also was Secretary of State for War twice, in the cabinets of Gladstone and Rosebery. He was the first First Lord of the Treasury to be officially called the "Prime Minister", the term only coming into official usage five days after he took office. He remains the only person to date to hold the positions of Prime Minister and Father of the House at the same time, and the last Liberal leader to gain a UK parliamentary majority.

Known colloquially as "CB", Campbell-Bannerman firmly believed in free trade, Irish Home Rule and the improvement of social conditions, including reduced working hours. A. J. A. Morris, in the Oxford Dictionary of National Biography, called him "Britain's first and only Radical prime minister". Following a general-election defeat in 1900, Campbell-Bannerman went on to lead the Liberal Party to a landslide victory over the Conservative Party at the 1906 general election – the last election in which the Liberals gained an overall majority in the House of Commons. The government he subsequently led passed legislation to ensure trade unions could not be liable for damages incurred during strike action, introduced free school meals for all children, and empowered local authorities to purchase agricultural land from private landlords. Campbell-Bannerman resigned as prime minister in April 1908 due to ill-health and was replaced by his chancellor, H. H. Asquith. He died 19 days later – the only prime minister to die in the official residence, 10 Downing Street.

== Early life ==
Henry Campbell-Bannerman was born on 7 September 1836 at Kelvinside House in Glasgow as Henry Campbell, the second son and youngest of the six children born to James Campbell of Stracathro and his wife Janet Bannerman. James Campbell had started work at a young age in the clothing trade in Glasgow, before in 1817 going into partnership with his brother, William Campbell, to found J.& W. Campbell & Co., a warehousing, general wholesale and retail drapery business. His cousin James was married to Jessie Campbell, pioneer of women's higher education in Glasgow.

In 1831 James Campbell was elected as a member of Glasgow Town Council and in the 1837 and 1841 general elections he stood as a Conservative candidate for the Glasgow constituency. He served as the Lord Provost of Glasgow from 1840 to 1843.

Campbell-Bannerman was educated at the High School of Glasgow (1845–1847), the University of Glasgow (1851–1853), and Trinity College, Cambridge (1854–1858), where he achieved a Third-Class Degree in the Classical Tripos. After graduating, he joined the family firm of J. & W. Campbell & Co., based in Glasgow's Ingram Street, and was made a partner in the firm in 1860. He was also commissioned as a lieutenant into the 53rd Lanarkshire Rifle Volunteer Corps, which was recruited from employees of the firm, and in 1867 was promoted to captain.

In 1871, Henry Campbell became Henry Campbell-Bannerman, the addition of the surname Bannerman being a requirement of the will of his uncle, Henry Bannerman, from whom in that year he had inherited the estate of Hunton Lodge (now Hunton Court) in Hunton, Kent. He did not like the "horrid long name" that resulted and invited friends to call him "C.B." instead.

Henry Campbell-Bannerman had an older brother, James Alexander Campbell, who in 1876 inherited their father's 4000-acre Stracathro estate. He served as the Conservative Member of Parliament for Glasgow and Aberdeen Universities from 1880 to 1906.

== Marriage ==
In 1860, Campbell-Bannerman married Sarah Charlotte Bruce, and he and his new bride set up house at 6 Clairmont Gardens in the Park district of the West End of Glasgow. The couple never had any children.

Campbell-Bannerman and Charlotte were an exceptionally close couple throughout their marriage; in the words of one historian, they "shared every thought and possible moment". Charlotte may have been the person who mostly encouraged Campbell-Bannerman to stand for election, given his local profile.

For several years an aunt occupied the big house at Hunton which Campbell-Bannerman had inherited in 1871. For their country residence, Campbell-Bannerman and his wife lived elsewhere, including Gennings Park, which they did not leave until 1887. They first occupied Hunton Lodge in 1894.

Campbell-Bannerman spoke French, German and Italian fluently, and every summer he and his wife spent a couple of months in Europe, usually in France and at the spa town of Marienbad in Bohemia. Campbell-Bannerman had a deep appreciation for French culture, and particularly enjoyed the novels of Anatole France. They also had an occasional home at Belmont Castle, Meigle, in Scotland.

Campbell-Bannerman and his wife were both reported to be enormous eaters, and in their later years each weighed nearly 20 stone (130 kg; 280 lb). Charlotte died on 30 August 1906. After losing her, Campbell-Bannerman was said to 'never be the same'.

== Member of Parliament ==
In April 1868, at the age of thirty-one, Campbell-Bannerman stood as a Liberal candidate in a by-election for the Stirling Burghs constituency, narrowly losing to fellow Liberal John Ramsay. However, at the general election in November of that year, Campbell-Bannerman defeated Ramsay and was elected to the House of Commons as the Liberal Member of Parliament for Stirling Burghs, a constituency that he would go on to represent for almost forty years.

Campbell-Bannerman rose quickly through the ministerial ranks, being appointed as Financial Secretary to the War Office in Gladstone's first government in November 1871, serving in this position until 1874 under Edward Cardwell, the Secretary of State for War. When Cardwell was raised to the peerage, Campbell-Bannerman became the Liberal government's chief spokesman on defence matters in the House of Commons. He was appointed to the same position from 1880 to 1882 in Gladstone's second government, and after serving as Parliamentary and Financial Secretary to the Admiralty between 1882 and 1884, Campbell-Bannerman was promoted to the Cabinet as Chief Secretary for Ireland in 1884, an important role with ongoing Home Rule debates.

In Gladstone's third and fourth governments, in 1886 and 1892 to 1894 respectively, as well as the Earl of Rosebery's government from 1894 to 1895, Campbell-Bannerman served as the Secretary of State for War. His only military experience was thirty years earlier with the 53rd Lanarkshire Rifles Volunteers. During his time in the War office, he introduced an experimental eight-hour day for the workers at the Woolwich Arsenal munitions factory. The results demonstrated that there was no loss in production. Therefore, Campbell-Bannerman extended the eight-hour day to the Army Clothing Department.

He persuaded the Duke of Cambridge, the Queen's cousin, to resign as Commander-in-Chief of the British Armed Forces. This earned Campbell-Bannerman a knighthood in the form of a Knight Grand Cross of the Order of the Bath (GCB) in Rosebery's 1895 Prime Minister's Resignation Honours. In 1895, Campbell unwittingly caused the fall of Rosebery's ministry, when the Earl's government lost a vote over C.B.'s handling of cordite reserves. Unionist MPs unexpectedly forced a successful motion of censure, and the failure led to Rosebery's resignation and the return to power of Lord Salisbury. Before the 1895 general election, Campbell-Bannerman lobbied strongly to succeed Arthur Peel as Speaker of the House of Commons, in part because he sought a less stressful role in public life. Rosebery, backed by the Liberal Leader in the Commons, Sir William Harcourt, refused since Campbell-Bannerman was viewed as indispensable to the Liberal's front-bench team in the lower House.

== Leader of the Liberal Party ==
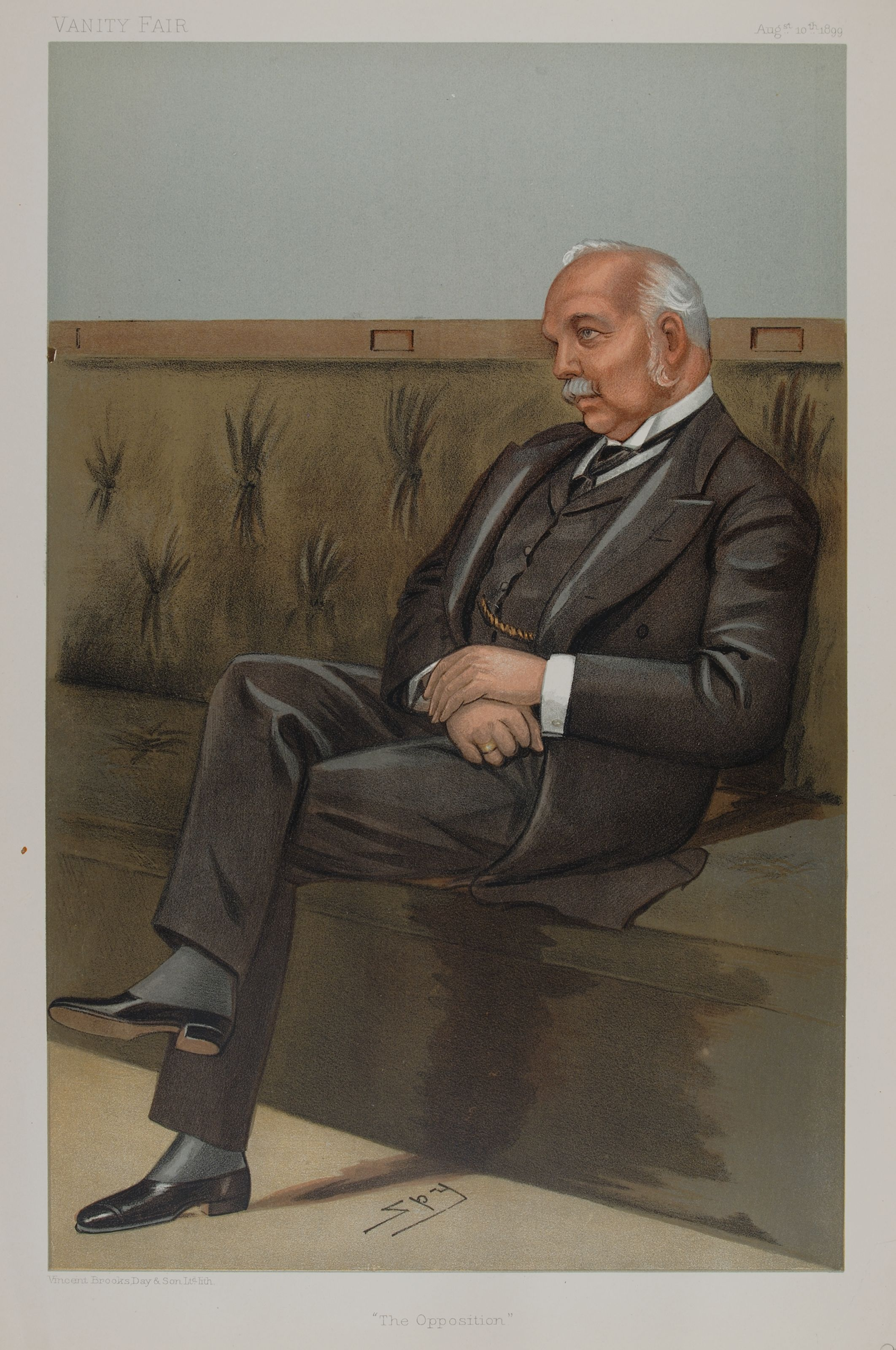
Campbell-Bannerman caricatured by Spy for Vanity Fair, 1899

On 6 February 1899, Campbell-Bannerman succeeded William Vernon Harcourt as Leader of the Liberals in the House of Commons, and Leader of the Opposition. The Boer War of 1899 split the Liberal Party into Imperialist and Pro-Boer factions, with CB strongly critical of the use of concentration camps as 'methods of barbarism'. Campbell-Bannerman faced the difficult task of holding together the strongly divided party, which was subsequently and unsurprisingly defeated in the "khaki election" of 1900. Campbell-Bannerman caused particular friction within his own party when in a speech to the National Reform Union in June 1901 and shortly after meeting Emily Hobhouse, he described the concentration camps set up by the British in the Boer War as "methods of barbarism".

The Liberal Party was later able to unify over its opposition to the Education Act 1902 and the Brussels Sugar Convention of 1902, in which Britain and nine other nations attempted to stabilise world sugar prices by setting up a commission to investigate export bounties and decide on penalties. The Conservative Government of Arthur Balfour had threatened countervailing duties and subsidies of West Indian sugar producers as a negotiating tool. The convention's intent was to lead to the gradual phasing out of export bounties, and Britain would then forbid the importation of subsidised sugar. In a speech to the Cobden Club on 28 November 1902, Campbell-Bannerman denounced the convention as threatening the sovereignty of Britain.

It means that we abandon our fiscal independence, together with our free-trade ways; that we subside into the tenth part of a Vehmgericht which is to direct us what sugar is to be countervailed, at what rate per cent. we are to countervail it, how much is to be put on for the bounty, and how much for the tariff being in excess of the convention tariff; and this being the established order of things, the British Chancellor of the Exchequer in his robes obeys the orders that he receives from this foreign convention, in which the Britisher is only one out of ten, and the House of Commons humbly submits to the whole transaction. ("Shame.") Sir, of all the insane schemes ever offered to a free country as a boon this is surely the maddest.

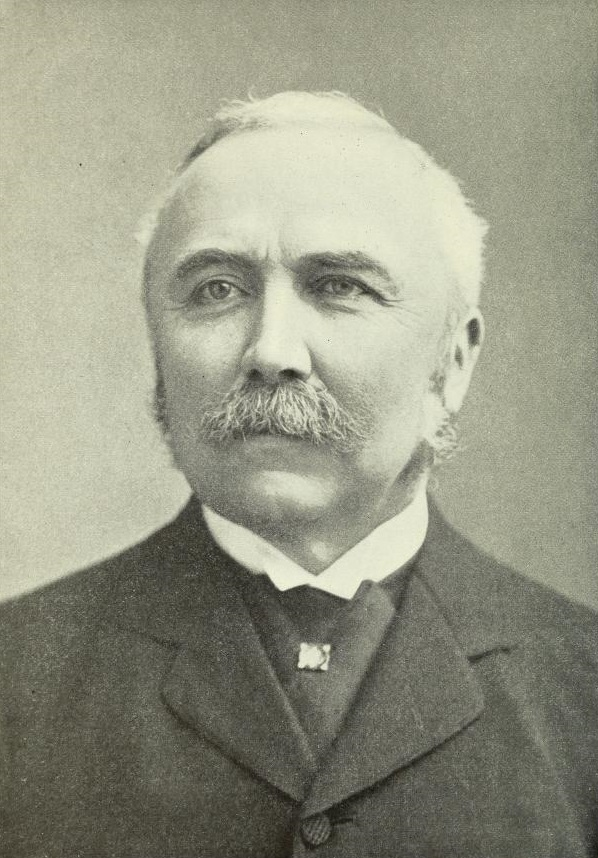
Campbell-Bannerman in 1904

However, it was Joseph Chamberlain's proposals for Tariff Reform in May 1903 that provided the Liberals with a great and nationally resonating cause on which to campaign and unify, due to its protectionist nature. Chamberlain's proposals dominated politics through the rest of 1903 up until the general election of 1906. Campbell-Bannerman, like other Liberals, held an unshakeable belief in free trade. In a speech at Bolton on 15 October 1903, he explained in greater detail the reasoning behind Liberal support for free trade.

We are satisfied that it is right because it gives the freest play to individual energy and initiative and character and the largest liberty both to producer and consumer. We say that trade is injured when it is not allowed to follow its natural course, and when it is either hampered or diverted by artificial obstacles.... We believe in free trade because we believe in the capacity of our countrymen. That at least is why I oppose protection root and branch, veiled and unveiled, one-sided or reciprocal. I oppose it in any form. Besides we have experience of fifty years, during which our prosperity has become the envy of the world.

In 1903, the Liberal Party's Chief Whip Herbert Gladstone negotiated a pact with Ramsay MacDonald of the Labour Representation Committee to withdraw Liberal candidates to help LRC candidates in certain seats, in return for LRC withdrawal in other seats to help Liberal candidates. This attempt to undermine and outflank the Conservatives, which would prove to be successful, formed what became known as the "Gladstone–MacDonald pact". Campbell-Bannerman got on well with Labour leaders, and he said in 1903 "we are keenly in sympathy with the representatives of Labour. We have too few of them in the House of Commons". Despite this comment, and his sympathies with many elements of the Labour movement, he was not a socialist. One biographer has written that "he was deeply and genuinely concerned about the plight of the poor and so had readily adopted the rhetoric of progressivism, but he was not a progressive".

== Premiership (1905–1908) ==
=== Appointment and general election ===
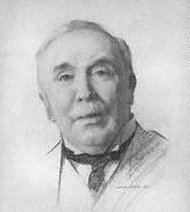
Sketch of Campbell-Bannerman

The Liberals found themselves suddenly returned to power in December 1905 when Arthur Balfour resigned as prime minister, prompting Edward VII to invite Campbell-Bannerman to form a minority government as the first Liberal prime minister of the 20th century. At 69, he was the oldest person to become prime minister for the first time in the 20th century, though Balfour had hoped that Campbell-Bannerman would not be able to form a strong government, ushering in a general election that he could win. Campbell-Bannerman also faced problems within his own party, through the so-called "Relugas Compact" between H. H. Asquith, Edward Grey and Richard Haldane, who planned to force him into the House of Lords, weakening him as prime minister and effectively allowing Asquith to govern as Leader of the House of Commons. Campbell-Bannerman saw off both of these issues by offering the positions of chancellor of the exchequer, foreign secretary and secretary of state for war to Asquith, Grey and Haldane respectively, which all three accepted, whilst immediately dissolving Parliament and calling a general election. In his first public speech as prime minister on 22 December 1905, Campbell-Bannerman launched the Liberal election campaign, focusing on the traditional Liberal platform of "peace, retrenchment and reform":

Expenditure calls for taxes, and taxes are the plaything of the tariff reformer. Militarism, extravagance, protection are weeds which grow in the same field, and if you want to clear the field for honest cultivation you must root them all out. For my own part, I do not believe that we should have been confronted by the spectre of protection if it had not been for the South African war. Depend upon it that in fighting for our open ports and for the cheap food and material upon which the welfare of the people and the prosperity of our commerce depend we are fighting against those powers, privileges, injustices, and monopolies which are unalterably opposed to the triumph of democratic principles.

Helped by the Lib–Lab pact that he had negotiated, the splits in the Conservatives over free trade and the positive election campaign that he fought, the Liberals won by a landslide, gaining 214 seats. The Conservatives saw their number of seats more than halve, and Arthur Balfour, now as Leader of the Opposition, lost his Manchester East seat to the Liberals. Campbell-Bannerman was the last Liberal to lead his party to an absolute majority in the House of Commons. Now with a majority of 124, Campbell-Bannerman was returned to Downing Street as a considerably-strengthened Prime Minister. The defeat of the Relugas conspirators in the wake of this stunning victory was later referred to as "one of the most delicious comedies in British political history".

Whereas in the past it had never been used formally, Campbell-Bannerman was the first First Lord of the Treasury to be given official use of the title "Prime Minister", a standard that continues to the present day. In 1907, by virtue of being the member of Parliament with the longest continuous service, Campbell-Bannerman became the Father of the House, the only serving British prime minister to do so.

=== Social reforms ===
In his election address, Campbell-Bannerman spoke in favour of reforming the poor law, reducing unemployment and improving working conditions in sweated factories. Richard Haldane, who would later join the Labour Party, claimed that Campbell-Bannerman's government "was if anything, too conservative...with that dear old Tory, C.B., at the head of it, determined to do as little as a fiery majority will allow him". However the historian A. J. A. Morris disagreed with this judgment, stating that Campbell-Bannerman was in 1906 what he had always been: a Gladstonian Liberal who favoured retrenchment in public expenditure that was perhaps at odds with any ambitious scheme of social reform.

Another later biographer, John Wilson, called Campbell-Bannerman a moderate social reformer, stating that Campbell-Bannerman favoured a better deal for the poor and the workers but like Gladstone he was opposed to too much state interference. He was said to have commented on the futility of 'our wealth, and learning and the fine flower of our civilisation and our Constitution and our political theories' calling them 'but dust and ashes' if the people who labour, the workers on whom 'the whole social fabric is maintained', continued to 'live and die in darkness and misery' in what he called 'the recesses of our great cities'. CB said that 'sunshine must be allowed to stream in, the water and the food must be kept pure and unadulterated, the streets light and clean'.

The government of Campbell-Bannerman allowed local authorities to provide free school meals (though this was not compulsory) and also strengthened the power of the trade unions with their Trade Disputes Act 1906. The Workmen's Compensation Act 1906 gave some workers the right against their employer to a certain amount of compensation if they suffered an accident at work. The Probation of Offenders Act 1907 was passed, which established supervision within the community for young offenders as an alternative to prison. Under Campbell-Bannerman's successor, H. H. Asquith, many far-reaching reforms were implemented, but Campbell-Bannerman himself had, in 1906, received a deputation from representatives of 25 women's suffragist groups (representing 1,000 women) though he said that his cabinet would object to this change.

=== House of Lords reforms ===
In the matter of House of Lords reforms, which was to become the dominant issue of the 1910 elections, Campbell-Bannerman proposed on 26 June 1907 that the Lords enjoy purely ornamental ancient privileges, but be deprived of all real legislative power; and that the Commons after tolerating for a few months the futile criticisms of the Lords would be empowered by mere lapse of a brief fraction of a year to ignore the very existence of a Second Chamber, and to proceed to pass their statute on their own authority, like the ordinances of the Long Parliament during the English Civil War. In essence, he maintained that the predominance of the Commons must prevail, without any appeal to the constituencies (i.e. a further general election). William Sharp McKechnie characterised this as an "untried one-chambered legislature" and stated that "it could only be carried out by some revolutionary procedure."

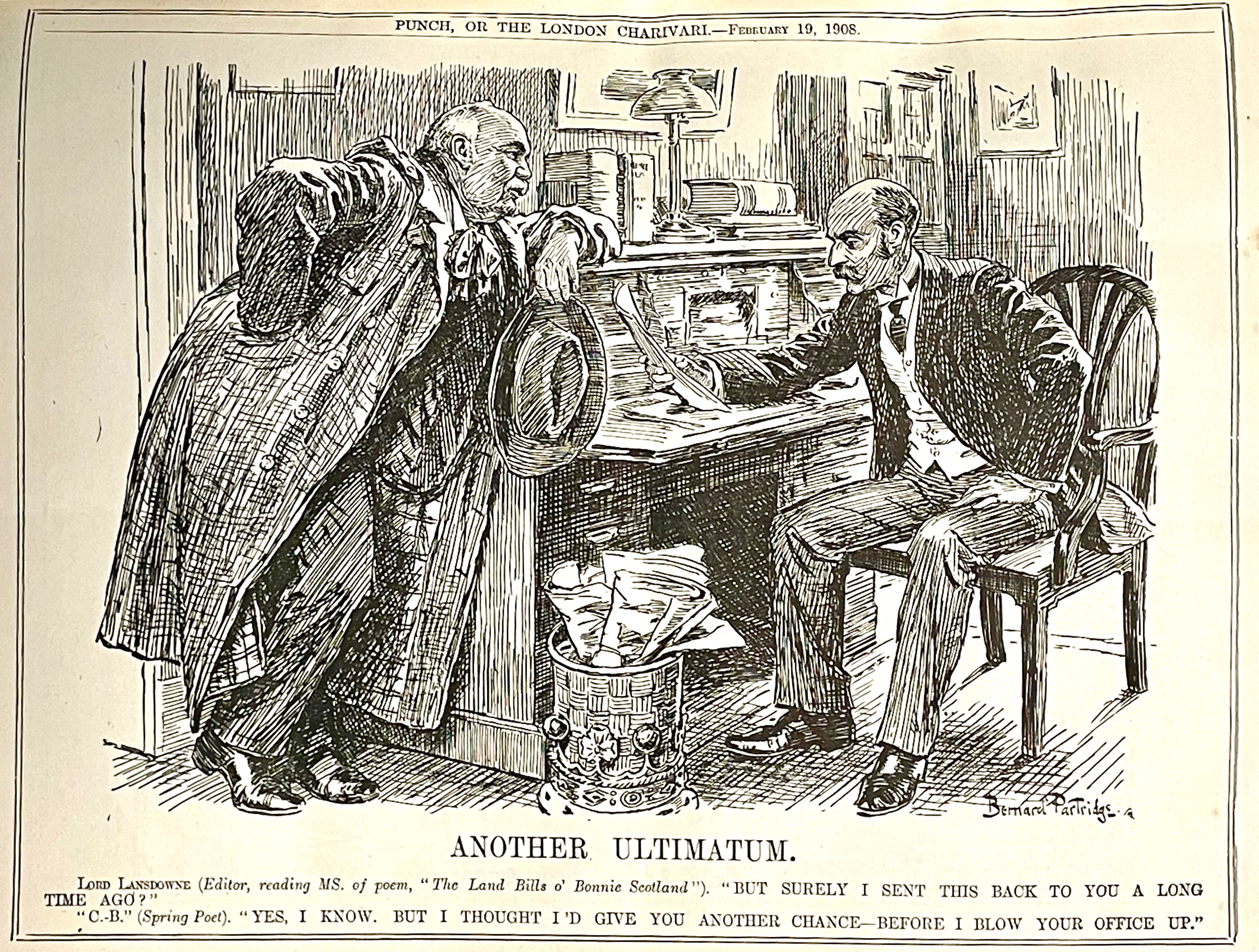
Punch cartoon dated 19 February 1908, making fun of the relationship between House of Commons (Henry Campbell-Bannerman) and House of Lords (Lord Lansdowne).

=== Foreign affairs ===
Campbell-Bannerman's first speech as prime minister endorsed the intent of the Hague Convention of 1907 to limit armaments. In March 1907, he published "The Hague Conference and the Limitation of Armaments", an article in which he cited the growing popular and moral authority of the peace movement as reasons to freeze the status quo in the naval arms race between Germany and Britain. His effort was generally considered a failure; in the words of historian Barbara Tuchman, "the argument was narrow steering between the rocks of conscience and the shoals of political reality and it pleased nobody." The 1907 conference ultimately restricted only a few new classes of armaments, such as submarine mines and projectiles fired or dropped from hot air balloons, but placed no limitations on naval expenditures.

In 1906, Campbell-Bannerman created a minor diplomatic incident with the Russian government when he responded to Tsar Nicholas II's dissolution of the Duma with a speech in which he declared, "The Duma is dead; long live the Duma!" Nonetheless, his premiership saw the Entente with Russia in 1907, brought about principally by the Foreign Secretary, Edward Grey. In January 1906 Grey sanctioned staff talks between Britain and France's army and navy but without any binding commitment. These included the plan to send one hundred thousand British soldiers to France within two weeks of a Franco-German war. Campbell-Bannerman was not informed of these at first but when Grey told him about them he gave them his blessing. This was the origin of the British Expeditionary Force that would be sent to France in 1914 at the start of the Great War with Germany. Campbell-Bannerman did not inform the rest of the Cabinet of these staff talks because there was no binding commitment and because he wanted to preserve the unity of the government. The radical members of the Cabinet such as Lord Loreburn, Lord Morley and Lord Bryce would have opposed such co-operation with the French.

Campbell-Bannerman visited France in April 1907 and met the Radical prime minister, Georges Clemenceau. Clemenceau believed that the British would help France in a war with Germany but Campbell-Bannerman told him Britain was in no way committed. He may have been unaware that the staff talks were still ongoing. Not long after this Violet Cecil met Clemenceau and she wrote down what he had said to her about the meeting:

Clemenceau said...'I am totally opposed to you – we both recognise a great danger and you are...reducing your army and weakening your navy.' 'Ah' said Bannerman 'but that is for economy!'...[Clemenceau] then said that he thought the English ought to have some kind of military service, at which Bannerman nearly fainted...'It comes to this' said Clemenceau 'in the event of your supporting us against Germany are you ready to abide by the plans agreed upon between our War Offices and to land 110,000 men on the coast while Italy marches with us in the ranks?' Then came the crowning touch of the interview. 'The sentiments of the English people would be totally averse to any troops being landed by England on the continent under any circumstances.' Clemenceau looks upon this as undoing the whole result of the entente cordiale and says that if that represents the final mind of the British Government, he has done with us.

Campbell-Bannerman's biographer John Wilson has described the meeting as "a clash between two fundamentally different philosophies". The Liberal journalist and friend of Campbell-Bannerman, F. W. Hirst, claimed that Campbell-Bannerman "had not a ghost of a notion that the French Entente was being converted into a...return to the old balance of power which had involved Great Britain in so many wars on the Continent. That...Grey and Haldane did not inform the Cabinet is astonishing; that a true-hearted apostle of peace like Sir Henry Campbell-Bannerman should have known of the danger and yet concealed it from his colleagues is incredible, and I am happy to conclude...with an assurance that in the days of his triumph the Liberal leader, having fought a good fight, kept the faith to the end and was in no way responsible for the European tragedy that came to pass six years after his death".

Campbell-Bannerman's government granted the Boer states, the Transvaal and the Orange River Colony, self-government within the British Empire through an Order in Council so as to bypass the House of Lords. This led to the Union of South Africa in 1910. The first South African Prime Minister, General Louis Botha, believed that "Campbell-Bannerman's act [in giving self-government back to the Boers] had redressed the balance of the Anglo-Boer War, or had, at any rate, given full power to the South Africans themselves to redress it". The former Boer general, Jan Smuts, wrote to David Lloyd George in 1919: "My experience in South Africa has made me a firm believer in political magnanimity, and your and Campbell-Bannerman's great record still remains not only the noblest but also the most successful page in recent British statesmanship". However the Unionist politician Lord Milner opposed it, saying in August 1907: "People here – not only Liberals – seem delighted, and to think themselves wonderfully fine fellows for having given South Africa back to the Boers. I think it all sheer lunacy".

== Campbell-Bannerman's government ==
- Henry Campbell-Bannerman – Prime Minister, First Lord of the Treasury and Leader of the House of Commons
- Robert Reid, 1st Earl Loreburn – Lord Chancellor
- Robert Crewe-Milnes, Earl of Crewe – Lord President of the Council
- Lord Ripon – Lord Privy Seal and Leader of the House of Lords
- H. H. Asquith – Chancellor of the Exchequer
- Herbert Gladstone – Secretary of State for the Home Department
- Edward Grey – Secretary of State for Foreign Affairs
- Victor Bruce, 9th Earl of Elgin – Secretary of State for the Colonies
- Richard Haldane – Secretary of State for War
- John Morley – Secretary of State for India
- Edward Marjoribanks, 2nd Baron Tweedmouth – First Lord of the Admiralty
- David Lloyd George – President of the Board of Trade
- Henry Fowler – Chancellor of the Duchy of Lancaster
- John Sinclair – Secretary for Scotland
- James Bryce – Chief Secretary for Ireland
- John Burns – President of the Local Government Board
- Charles Wynn-Carington, Earl Carrington – President of the Board of Agriculture
- Augustine Birrell – President of the Board of Education
- Sydney Buxton – Postmaster-General

=== Changes ===
- January 1907 – Augustine Birrell succeeds Bryce as Irish Secretary. Reginald McKenna succeeds Birrell at the Board of Education.
- March 1907 – Lewis Harcourt, the First Commissioner of Works, enters the Cabinet.

== Retirement and death ==
Not long after he became Father of the House in 1907, Campbell-Bannerman's health took a turn for the worse. Following a series of heart attacks, the most serious in November 1907, he began to fear that he would not be able to survive to the end of his term. He eventually resigned as prime minister on 3 April 1908, and was succeeded by his Chancellor of the Exchequer, H. H. Asquith. Campbell-Bannerman remained both a Member of Parliament and Leader of the Liberal Party, and continued to live at 10 Downing Street in the immediate aftermath of his resignation, intending to make other arrangements in the near future. However, his health began to decline at an even quicker pace than before, and he died on 22 April 1908, nineteen days after his resignation. His last words were "This is not the end of me". He remains to date the only former prime minister to die within 10 Downing Street. Campbell-Bannerman was buried in the churchyard of Meigle Parish Church, Perthshire, near Belmont Castle, his home since 1887. A relatively modest stone plaque set in the exterior wall of the church serves as a memorial.

St Mary's Church, Hunton (English Heritage Legacy ID: 432265) contains a marble tablet on the nave wall dedicated to Henry Campbell-Bannerman.

== Legacy ==
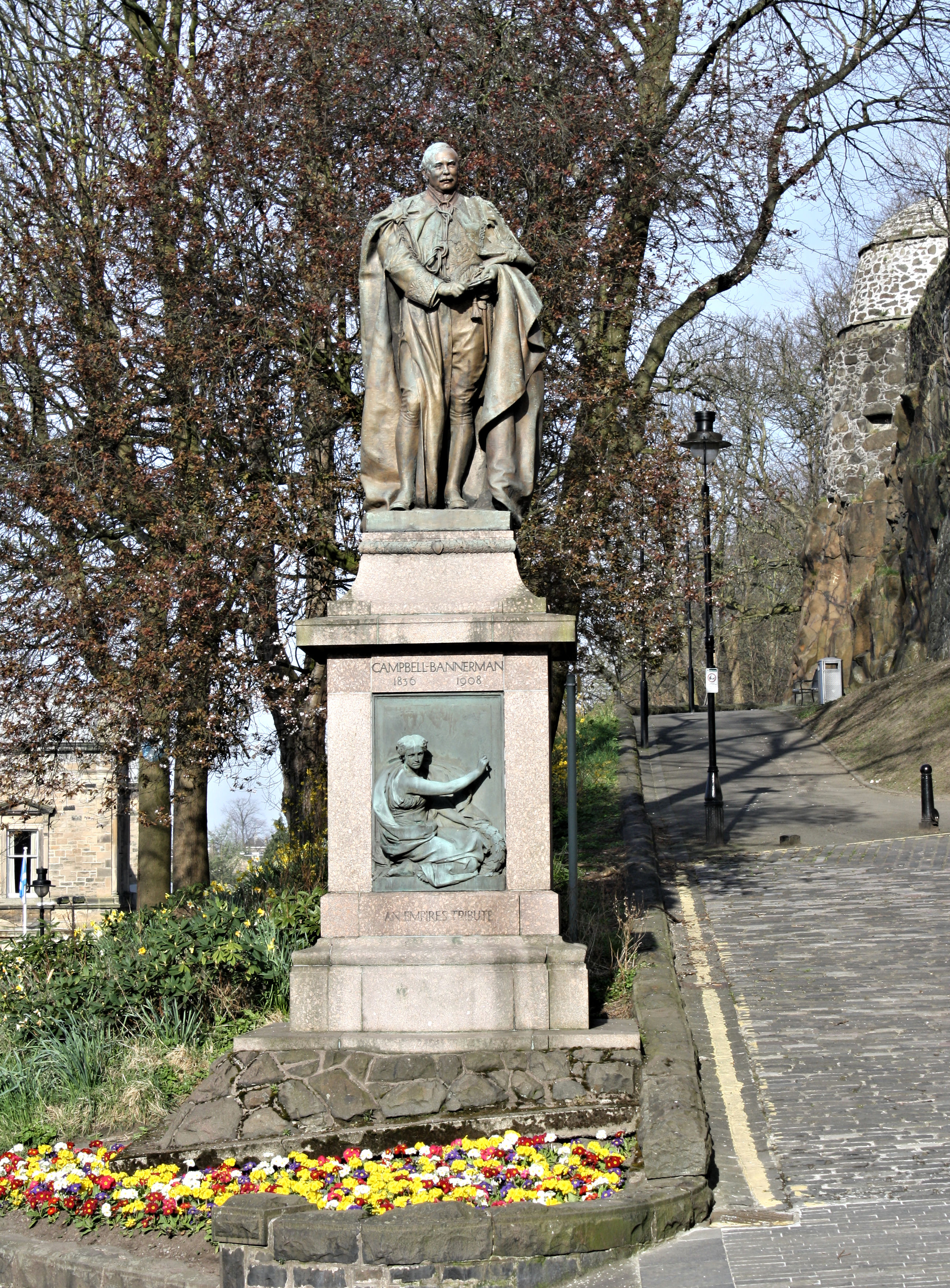
Statue of Campbell-Bannerman in Stirling

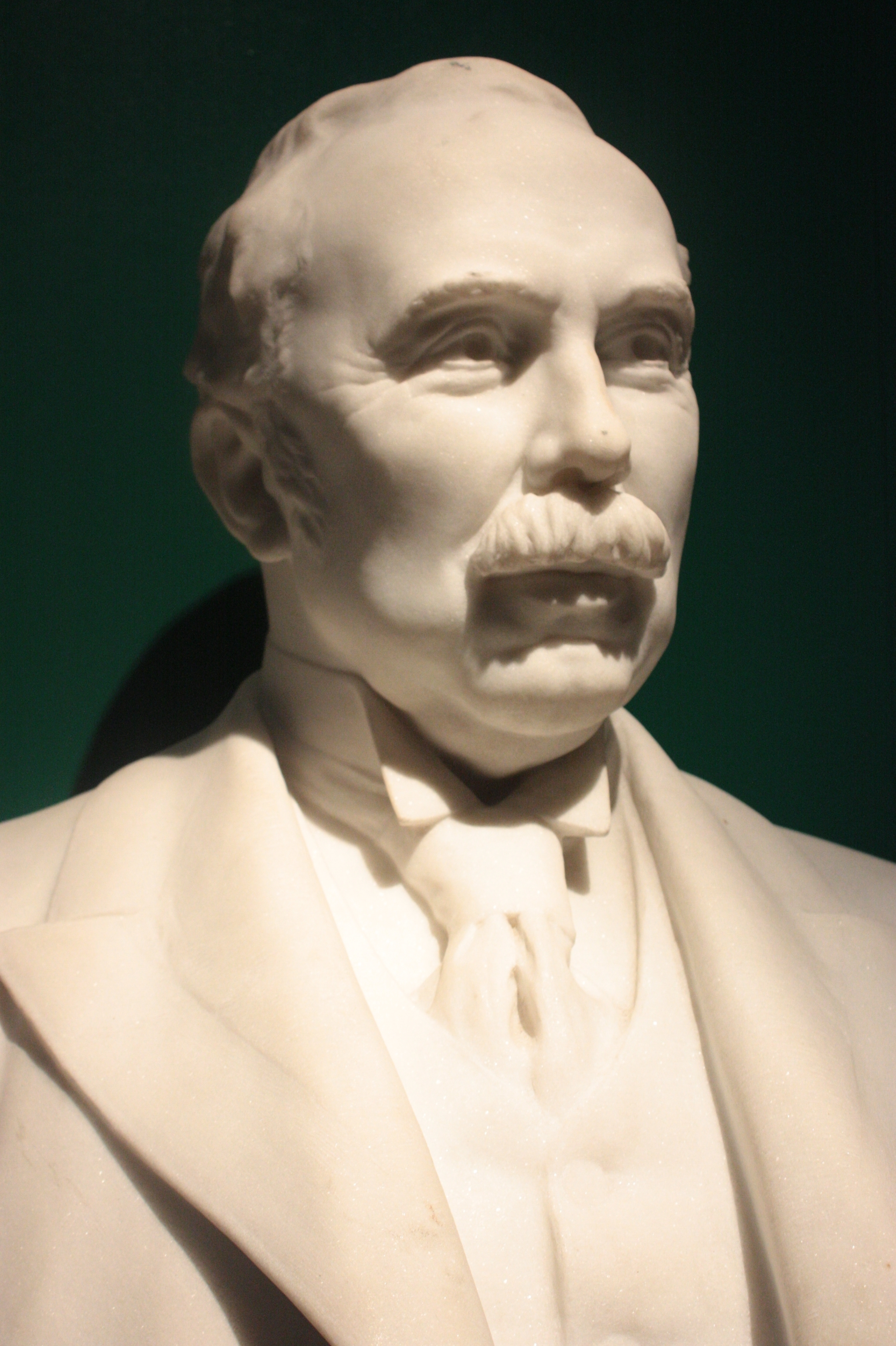
Henry Campbell-Bannerman by Paul Raphael Montford

=== Views of contemporaries ===
On the day of Campbell-Bannerman's death the flag of the National Liberal Club was lowered to half-mast, the blinds were drawn and his portrait was draped in black as a sign of mourning. John Redmond, the leader of the Irish Nationalist Party, paid tribute to Campbell-Bannerman by saying that "We all feel that Ireland has lost a brave and considerate friend". David Lloyd George said on hearing of Campbell-Bannerman's death:

I think it will be felt by the community as a whole as if they had lost a relative. Certainly those who have been associated with him closely for years will feel a deep sense of personal bereavement. I have never met a great public figure since I have been in politics who so completely won the attachment and affection of the men who came into contact with him. He was not merely admired and respected; he was absolutely loved by us all. I really cannot trust myself to say more. The masses of the people of this country, especially the more unfortunate of them, have lost the best friend they ever had in the high places of the land. His sympathy in all suffering was real, deep, and unaffected. He was truly a great man—a great head and a great heart. He was absolutely the bravest man I ever met in politics. He was entirely free from fear. He was a man of supreme courage. Ireland has certainly lost one of her truest friends, and what is true of Ireland is true of every section of the community of this Empire which has a fight to maintain against powerful foes.

In an uncharacteristically emotional speech on 27 April, the day of Campbell-Bannerman's funeral, his successor H. H. Asquith told the House of Commons:

What was the secret of the hold which in these later days he unquestionably had on the admiration and affection of men of all parties and all creeds? ...he was singularly sensitive to human suffering and wrongdoing, delicate and even tender in his sympathies, always disposed to despise victories won in any sphere by mere brute force, an almost passionate lover of peace. And yet we have not seen in our time a man of greater courage—courage not of the defiant or aggressive type, but calm, patient, persistent, indomitable...In politics I think he may be fairly described as an idealist in aim, and an optimist by temperament. Great causes appealed to him. He was not ashamed, even on the verge of old age, to see visions and to dream dreams. He had no misgivings as to the future of democracy. He had a single-minded and unquenchable faith in the unceasing progress and the growing unity of mankind...He never put himself forward, yet no one had greater tenacity of purpose. He was the least cynical of mankind, but no one had a keener eye for the humours and ironies of the political situation. He was a strenuous and uncompromising fighter, a strong Party man, but he harboured no resentments, and was generous to a fault in appreciation of the work of others, whether friends or foes. He met both good and evil fortune with the same unclouded brow, the same unruffled temper, the same unshakable confidence in the justice and righteousness of his cause...He has gone to his rest, and to-day in this House, of which he was the senior and the most honoured Member, we may call a truce in the strife of parties, while we remember together our common loss, and pay our united homage to a gracious and cherished memory—

How happy is he born and taught
That serveth not another's will;
Whose armour is his honest thought,
And simple truth his utmost skill;
This man is freed from servile bands
Of hope to rise or fear to fall;
Lord of himself, though not of lands,
And, having nothing, yet hath all.

Robert Smillie, the trade unionist and Labour MP, said that, after Gladstone, Campbell-Bannerman was the greatest man he had ever met.

=== Views of historians ===
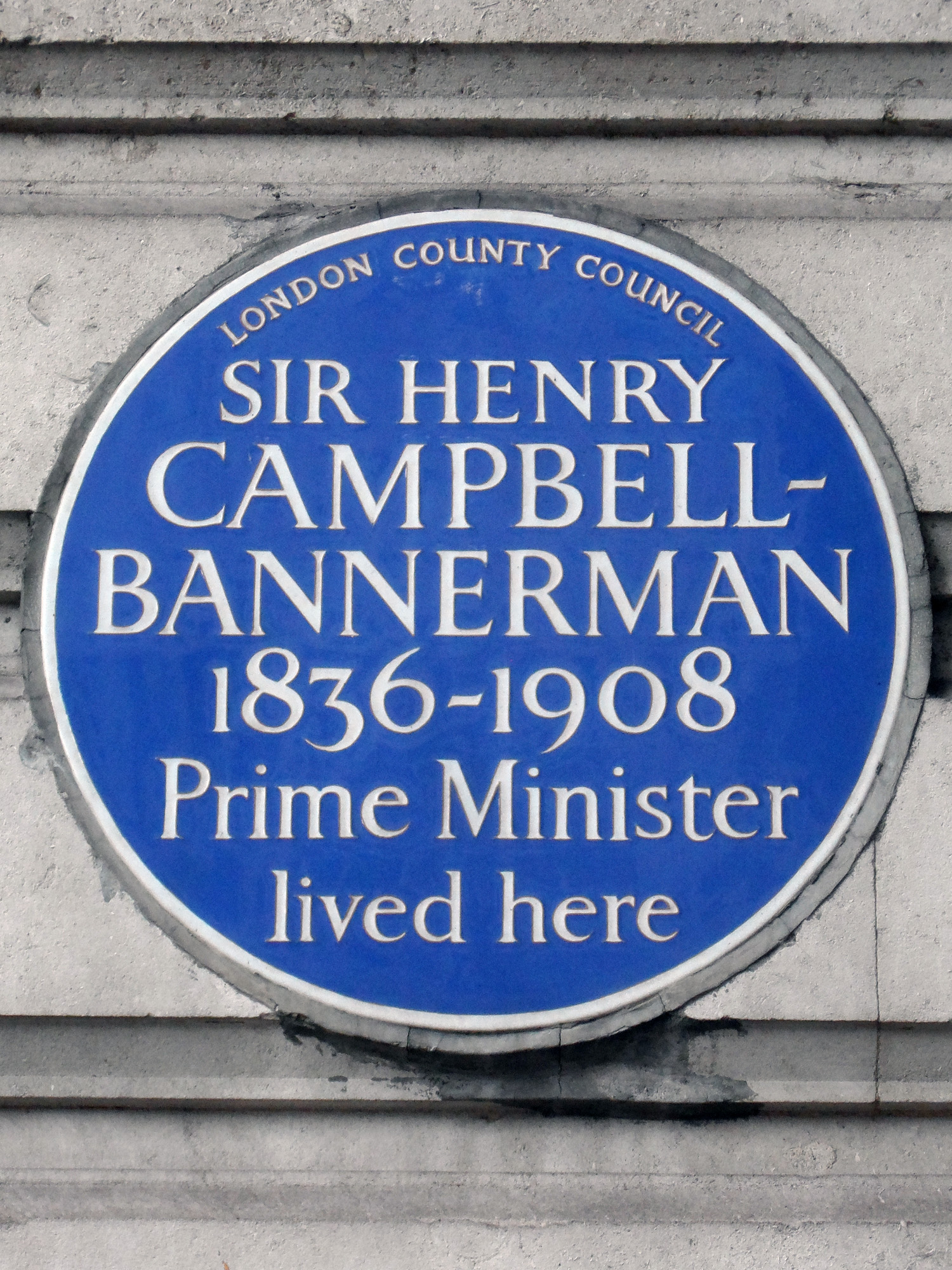
Blue plaque at 6 Grosvenor Place, London

Historians agree that in his 28 months as prime minister, Campbell-Bannerman was relatively undistinguished with few significant reforms enacted. Major bills such as plural voting, land reform, and licensing reform were shredded in the Lords. Education Bills of 1906 and 1907 were rejected by both party supporters and Unionist peers. The bills that were passed were either technical or the result of cross-party consensus. Campbell-Bannerman had no apparent plan to circumvent the Lords' veto and did little to stimulate the social reform program. Campbell-Bannerman was passive and uninvolved in his dealings with the cabinet, leading to diffuse debates and ill-focused methods of handling business. He failed to supervise Grey's foreign policy, He failed to consult the full cabinet before initiating momentous discussions on defence interests with the French in 1906. As a result, his competence was severely questioned. However, historians have identified a few positive aspects of his tenure, including laying the foundation for a more effective government under Asquith. He was part of a period of Scottish dominance in the Prime Minister role and he represented Scotland's full integration into the political realm. Additionally, Campbell-Bannerman was the first Prime Minister with direct business experience and not from a landed, Anglican background.

Historian George Dangerfield in 1935 concluded that Campbell-Bannerman's death "was like the passing of true Liberalism. Henry had believed in Peace, Retrenchment, and Reform, those amiable deities who presided so complacently over large portions of the Victorian era... And now almost the last true worshipper at those large, equivocal altars lay dead". Campbell-Bannerman held firmly to the Liberal principles of Richard Cobden and William Ewart Gladstone. It was not until Campbell-Bannerman's departure that the doctrines of New Liberalism came to be implemented. R. B. McCallum stated that "Campbell-Bannerman was of pure Gladstonian vintage and a hero to the Radicals". Friedrich Hayek said: "Perhaps the government of Sir Henry Campbell-Bannerman... should be regarded as the last Liberal government of the old type, while under his successor, H. H. Asquith, new experiments in social policy were undertaken which were only doubtfully compatible with the older Liberal principles".

Other historical accounts, however, have portrayed Campbell-Bannerman as a genuine progressive figure. According to one study, Campbell-Bannerman's views "were broadly those of the party's centre-left: a belief in individual freedom, a desire to help the disadvantaged, an aversion to imperialism and support for Irish self-government." During his time as prime minister, Campbell-Bannerman supported such measures as safeguards for trade unions, old-age pensions, and urban planning to improve housing. As far back as 1903, Campbell-Bannerman had spoken of the intention of the Liberal Party to do something about the "twelve million people in England [who] were living on the verge of starvation," During the 1930s, one-time Labour Party leader George Lansbury wrote admiringly of Campbell-Bannerman, describing him as a man who "believed in peace and was not afraid of the word Socialism, and did believe unemployment was a national problem and the unemployed the care of the State."

His bronze bust, sculpted by Paul Raphael Montford, is in Westminster Abbey. There is a blue plaque outside Campbell-Bannerman's house at 6 Grosvenor Place in London, unveiled in 2008. Campbell-Bannerman was the subject of several parody novels based on the 1865 Lewis Carroll novel Alice in Wonderland, such as Caroline Lewis's (pseudonym for Edward Harold Begbie, J. Stafford Ransome, and Michael Henry Temple) Clara in Blunderland (1902) and Lost in Blunderland (1903).

== Arms ==
Coat of arms of Henry Campbell-Bannerman
Crest Dexter: On a wreath of the liveries, a demi-man in armour proper (Bannerman); Sinister: ON a wreath of the liveries, a boar's head erased proper. Escutcheon Quarterly, 1 & 4, Party per pale gules and sable, a banner displayed bendways argent, thereon a canton azure charged with a saltire of the third (Bannerman), 2 & 3, Gyronny of eight or and sable, on a chief engraile argent, a galley, her oars in action, between two hunting-horns stringed all of the second. (Campbell). Motto Dexter: Patriæ fidelis (A faithful country), Sinister: Ne obliviscaris (You must not forget).

== See also ==
- Liberalism in the United Kingdom

== Notes ==
=== Bibliography ===
- Bernstein, George L. "Sir Henry Campbell-Bannerman and the Liberal Imperialists." Journal of British Studies 23.1 (1983): 105–124.
- Cameron, Ewen A. Maistly Scotch Campbell-Bannerman and Liberal Leadership', Journal of Liberal History, Issue 54, Spring 2007.
- Eccleshall, Robert, and Graham Walker, eds. Biographical Dictionary of British Prime Ministers (1998) pp. 239–243. online
- Gutzke, David W. "Rosebery and Campbell‐Bannerman: the Conflict over Leadership Reconsidered." Historical Research 54.130 (1981): 241–250.
- Goldman, Lawrence (25 May 2006). "The general election of 1906". Oxford Dictionary of National Biography (online ed.). Oxford University Press. doi:10.1093/ref:odnb/95348. ISBN 978-0-1986-1412-8. (Subscription, Wikipedia Library access or UK public library membership required.)
- Greaves, Tony. 'Sir Henry Campbell-Bannerman', in Duncan Brack (ed.), Dictionary of Liberal Biography (Politico's, 1998), pp. 69–73.
- Harris, J. F. and C. Hazlehurst, 'Campbell-Bannerman as prime minister', History, 55 (1970), pp. 360–83. online
- Hattersley, Roy. Campbell-Bannerman (British Prime Ministers of the 20th century series) (Haus, 2006). online
- Leonard, Dick. "Sir Henry Campbell-Bannerman—'A Good, Honest Scotchman'." in Leonard, A Century of Premiers (Palgrave Macmillan, 2005) pp. 37–52.
- Mackie, J. B. The model member. Sir Henry Campbell-Bannerman, forty years representative of the Stirling burghs (1914) online
- Mackintosh, John Pitcairn. British Prime Ministers in the Twentieth Century: Balfour to Chamberlain. Vol. 1 ( Weidenfeld & Nicolson, 1977).
- Massie, Robert K. Dreadnought: Britain, Germany, and the Coming of the Great War New York: Random House, 1991.
- Morris, A. J. A. (January 2008) [September 2004]. "Sir Henry Campbell-Bannerman (1836–1908)". Oxford Dictionary of National Biography (online ed.). Oxford University Press. doi:10.1093/ref:odnb/94620. (Subscription, Wikipedia Library access or UK public library membership required.)
- Mumford, Alan, "The political skills of four Liberal Prime Ministers: Part 1: Rosebery and Campbell-Bannerman" Journal of Liberal History #129, (winter 2025-26) pp 8–20, 55. online
- O'Connor, T. P. Sir Henry Campbell-Bannerman (Hodder & Stoughton, 1908).
- Sinclair, John (1912). "Campbell-Bannerman, Henry" . In Lee, Sidney (ed.). Dictionary of National Biography (2nd supplement). London: Smith, Elder & Co.
- Self, Robert (2006). Neville Chamberlain: A Biography. Ashgate. ISBN 978-0-7546-5615-9.
- Spender, J.A., The Life of the Right Honourable Sir Henry Campbell-Bannerman GCB (Hodder & Stoughton, 1923, 2 Volumes). online
- Tuchman, Barbara. The Proud Tower. Ed. Margaret MacMillan. New York: Library of America, 2012.
- Wilson, John (1973). CB: A Life of Sir Henry Campbell-Bannerman. Constable & St Martin's Press. online

Parliament of the United Kingdom
Preceded by John Ramsay	Member of Parliament for Stirling Burghs; 1868–1908	Succeeded by Arthur Ponsonby
Political offices
Preceded by John Vivian	Financial Secretary to the War Office; 1871–1874	Succeeded by Frederick Stanley
Preceded by Robert Loyd-Lindsay	Financial Secretary to the War Office; 1880–1882	Succeeded by Arthur Hayter
Preceded by George Otto Trevelyan	Parliamentary Secretary to the Admiralty; 1882–1884	Succeeded by Thomas Brassey
Preceded by George Otto Trevelyan	Chief Secretary for Ireland; 1884–1885	Succeeded by William Hart Dyke
Preceded by Gathorne Gathorne-Hardy, Viscount Cranbrook	Secretary of State for War; 1886	Succeeded by William Henry Smith
Preceded by Edward Stanhope	Secretary of State for War; 1892–1895	Succeeded by Henry Petty-Fitzmaurice, 5th Marquess of Lansdowne
Preceded by William Vernon Harcourt	Leader of the Opposition; 1899–1905	Succeeded by Arthur Balfour
Preceded by Arthur Balfour	Prime Minister of the United Kingdom; 1905–1908	Succeeded by H. H. Asquith
Preceded by Arthur Balfour	First Lord of the Treasury; 1905–1908	Succeeded by H. H. Asquith
Preceded by Arthur Balfour	Leader of the House of Commons; 1905–1908	Succeeded by H. H. Asquith
Party political offices
Preceded by William Vernon Harcourt	Leader of the Liberal Party; 1899–1908; With John Wodehouse, 1st Earl of Kimberley (1899–1902); John Spencer, 5th Earl Spencer (1902–05)	Succeeded by H. H. Asquith
Preceded by William Vernon Harcourt	Liberal Leader in the Commons; 1899–1908	Succeeded by H. H. Asquith
Preceded by Earl of Rosebery	President of the Scottish Liberal Federation; 1901–1908	Succeeded by H. H. Asquith
Honorary titles
Preceded by George Henry Finch	Father of the House; 1907–1908	Succeeded by John Kennaway
