= Charlotte Bruce =

Charlotte Bruce may refer to:

- Charlotte Bruce (1832–1906), wife of Henry Campbell-Bannerman
- Charlotte Bruce, wife of Terry L. Bruce
- Charlotte Bruce, wife of Frederick Locker-Lampson
- Charlotte Bruce (1771–1816), wife of Philip Charles Durham
