= Lost in Blunderland =

1903 novel by Edward Harold Begbie

Lost in Blunderland: The Further Adventures of Clara
- First edition cover of Lost in Blunderland
- Author: Caroline Lewis (Edward Harold Begbie, J. Stafford Ransome, and Michael Henry Temple)
- Language: English
- Genre: Fantasy novel, parody
- Publisher: William Heinemann
- Publication date: 1903
- Publication place: United Kingdom
- Media type: Print (hardback)
- Pages: xvi, 150
- Preceded by: Clara in Blunderland

Lost in Blunderland: The Further Adventures of Clara is a novel by Caroline Lewis (pseudonym for Edward Harold Begbie, J. Stafford Ransome, and Michael Henry Temple), written in 1903 and published by William Heinemann of London. It is a political parody of Lewis Carroll's two books, Alice's Adventures in Wonderland (1865) and Through the Looking-Glass (1871) and the sequel to Lewis' Clara in Blunderland. Lost in Blunderland, like its precursor, criticises the British government's approach to the Second Boer War.

It is critical of the early administration of Prime Minister Arthur Balfour, who is represented by a little girl named Clara. A number of other notable British politicians are identified in the book. The Red Queen is Joseph Chamberlain and Crumpty-Bumpty is Henry Campbell-Bannerman. There are additional characters, such as the Lion and the Unicorn, representing Britain and Germany respectively. The authors nonetheless included a tongue-in-cheek disclaimer denying any political intention: "Persons of a prying habit of mind have persisted in tracing political allusions in the innocent if not lucid narrative of Clara’s former adventures. The Author and the Artist beg to be allowed to disclaim anything of the sort."

The book features 40 drawings by journalist J. Stafford Ransome (credited as "S.R.") after the originals by John Tenniel.
