= Bromley, Zimbabwe =

Bromley
- Location within Zimbabwe
- Coordinates: 18°05′S 31°20′E
- Country: Zimbabwe
- Province: Mashonaland East
- Elevation: 1,560 m (5,120 ft)
- Time zone: UTC+2 (CAT)

Bromley is a village in Mashonaland East province in Zimbabwe. It is located on the A3 road between Harare and Marondera, about 48 kilometres (30 mi) south-east of Harare. Originally it was called Broomley after a dower house on the Tullichewan Estate on the banks of Loch Lomond in Scotland. It is now a small trading centre and focal point for an agricultural and cattle ranching district.
