= Clara in Blunderland =

1902 novel by Edward Harold Begbie

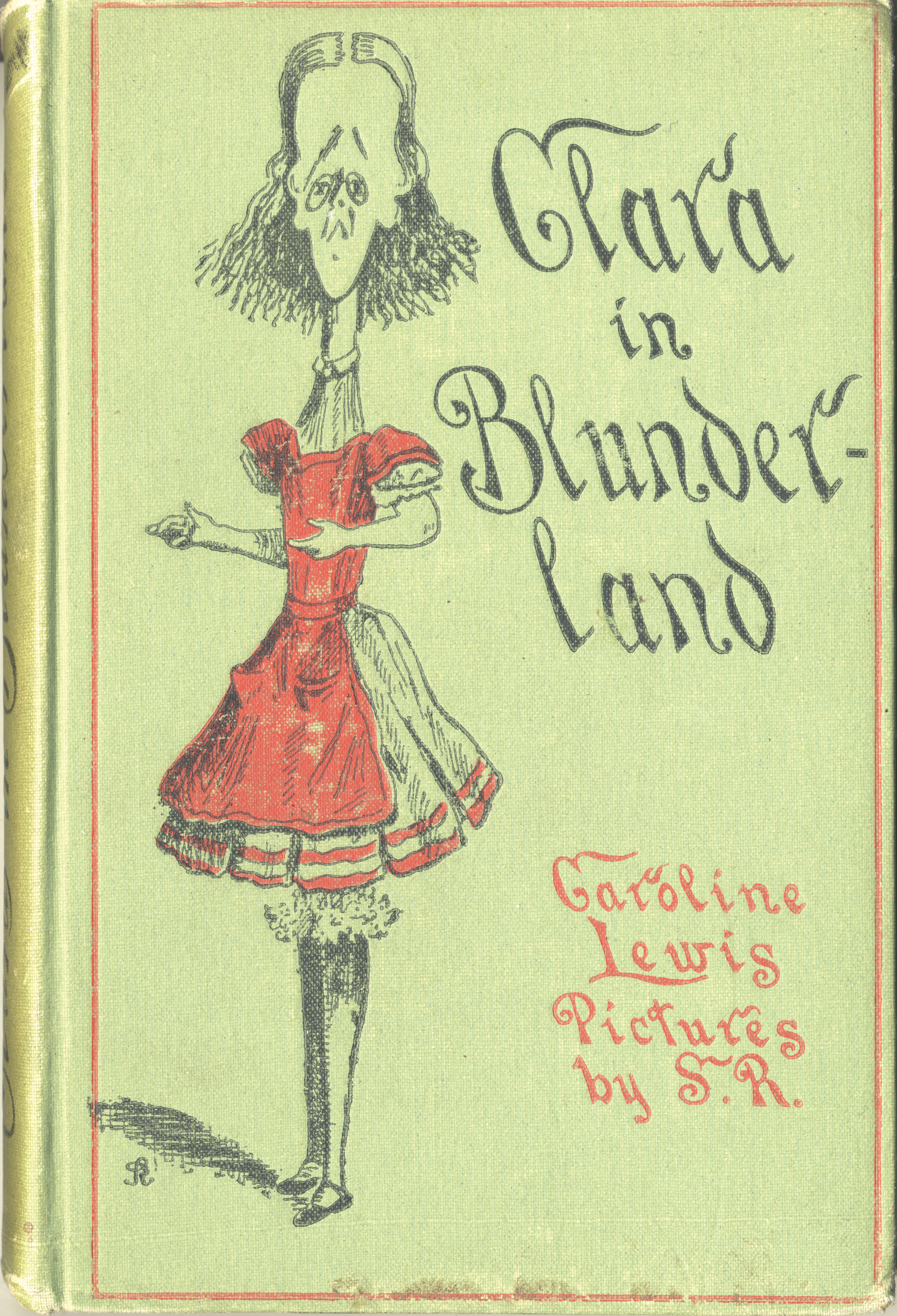
- First edition cover of Clara in Blunderland
- Author: Caroline Lewis (Edward Harold Begbie, J. Stafford Ransome, and Michael Henry Temple)
- Language: English
- Genre: Fantasy novel, parody
- Publisher: William Heinemann
- Publication date: 1902
- Publication place: United Kingdom
- Media type: Print (hardback)
- Pages: xvi, 150
- Followed by: Lost in Blunderland

Clara in Blunderland is a novel by Caroline Lewis (a pseudonym for Edward Harold Begbie, J. Stafford Ransome, and Michael Henry Temple), written in 1902 and published by William Heinemann of London. It is a political parody of Lewis Carroll's two books, Alice's Adventures in Wonderland (1865) and Through the Looking-Glass (1871). The book was followed a year later by a sequel, Lost in Blunderland.

The book is critical of the British Government's engagement in the Second Boer War and its subsequent domestic and foreign policy choices. Prime Minister Arthur Balfour is represented by Clara, the equivalent of Alice, who "can get in a hole when no one else would have found it possible." A number of other prominent politicians are represented by other characters from the "Alice" books: the Red Queen is Joseph Chamberlain, the Duchess is Lord Salisbury, Crumpty-Bumpty is Henry Campbell-Bannerman, the Walrus is William Vernon Harcourt, the Dalmeny Cat is Lord Rosebery, and the Caterpillar is Winston Churchill.

The book features 40 drawings by journalist J. Stafford Ransome (credited as "S.R.") after the originals by John Tenniel.

Clara in Blunderland ran to ten editions. It and its sequel were among a number of satirical works drawing on Alice's Adventures in Wonderland published around the turn of the century; others included Saki's The Westminster Alice (1902) and Charles Geake and Francis Carruthers Gould's John Bull's Adventures in the Fiscal Wonderland (1904), which also featured representations of Balfour and Chamberlain.
