= Tullichewan =

Coordinates: 55.9956°N 4.5963°W

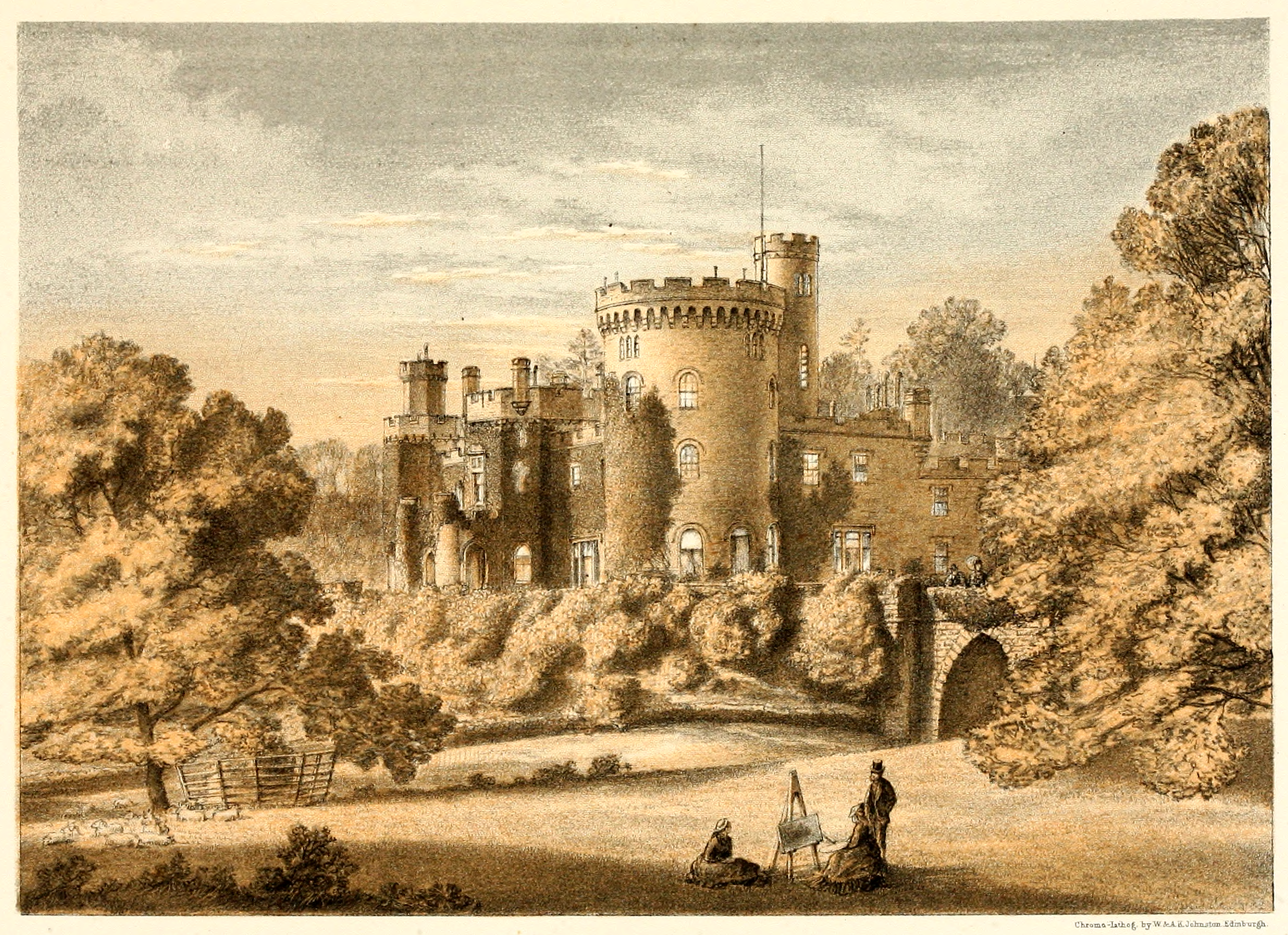
Tullichewan Castle from the Dumbarton Book

View of Tullichewan Castle

Tullichewan is a former estate in the Vale of Leven, near Loch Lomond, Scotland. Tullichewan Castle was built in 1792 and demolished in 1954. It was located on the western edge of Alexandria, close to the present route of the A82.

== History ==
Originally called Tuloch Eoghain, "the hill of Eoghan." In the 17th century it was acquired by the Colquhoun family, and was known as Tully-Colquhoun or Tillyquhoun; and then Tullichewan. The Tullichewan estate was sold by the Colquhoun clan to James Buchanan in 1792.

Tullichewan Castle was designed in 1792 by architect Robert Lugar, who also designed Balloch Castle. It is the first example in Scotland of an asymmetrical Gothic house. The Horrocks family purchased the castle in 1817, living there until 1843. The estate was then sold to William Campbell of J & W Campbell, Glasgow merchants and remained in the Campbell family until the twentieth century.

The last owner was J Scott Anderson who acquired the house around 1930. At the outbreak of World War II, Tullichewan Castle Estate was requisitioned by the Royal Navy, who retained it for the rest of the war. Tullichewan Castle Camp was put to various uses. After the war, it was used as accommodation for workers at the Royal Naval Torpedo Factory in Alexandria. After the war, Mr J Scott Anderson returned to live in the castle, until its upkeep became too much. The castle then lay abandoned until it was finally demolished by explosives in 1954.

Although modern development has consumed most of the former estate, and little remains, a number of remnants are reported to have survived. The A82 dual carriageway and the A811 road were built through the grounds, with housing developments and the Vale of Leven Hospital covering the estate. The former stables and a fragment of the original tower can still be seen from the A82. The north lodge, or gatehouse, has been lost in the area of Tullichewan Caravan Park, where the estate also had a walled orchard. The south lodge can still be found on Main Street, Alexandria, north of the entrance to Christie Park. Of the Camp, no trace remains.

== See also ==
- William Campbell of Tullichewan
- Bromley, Zimbabwe
