= Michael Henry Temple =

English writer and inventor

Michael Henry Temple (sometimes Henry Michael Temple) (1862–1928) was an English journalist and author. He is now known as the inventor of the chess variant Kriegspiel.

== Life ==
He was the son of Charles Temple of Douglas, Isle of Man, Bengal Civil Service, and Hannah Maria Sadler, youngest daughter of Michael Thomas Sadler; He was born at Douglas in March 1862, and educated at Leeds Grammar School from age nine, living then in Headingley.

Temple matriculated at Keble College, Oxford in 1881, graduating B.A. in 1884. He was called to the bar at the Inner Temple in 1886. He went the North-Eastern Circuit.

Temple joined the staff of The Globe around 1888, and became its chief leader writer. In 1903 he was living in King's Bench Walk, London, but not calling himself a barrister. In 1908 he was living in Ongar, Essex.

In 1917 Leopold Maxse began to edit The Globe, covertly, starting a period of expansion of the newspaper's circulation that ended in 1921 when it was taken over by the Pall Mall Gazette. Temple wrote for Maxse's National Review, in 1918 publishing articles there on "The Failure of the Church" and "The Bee as a Bolshevist" (reprinted 1919 as "The Bolshevik Bee", Lotus Magazine).

Temple died at Ferring on 25 October 1928.

== Politics ==
At university, Temple attempted to become President of the Oxford Union, losing out to Anthony Hope. He was appointed one of the two initial secretaries of the political committee of the National Conservative Club, with T. O. Hastings Lee, their duties including support of parliamentary candidates, in 1887. That year, he took part in the Hampstead Parliamentary Debating Society.

Temple spoke on tithes and Welsh disestablishment to the York Church Institute in 1888; that year he took part in a debate at the Kensington Parliament on House of Lords reform. In 1889 he addressed the Islington branch of the Primrose League on political economy. In the 1891 Northampton by-election caused by the death of Charles Bradlaugh, he campaigned for the Unionist candidate Robert Arthur Germaine of the Inner Temple, who lost heavily to the Liberal Philip Manfield.

In 1892, Temple was a Moderate candidate for Finsbury East in the London County Council election. The other candidate on the Moderate slate was James Toleman of Goswell Road; a newspaper report in February stated that Temple "appears to be totally unknown" in the area. He addressed the Acton Conservative Association in March. The successful candidates were the Earl of Rosebery and John Williams Benn for the Progressive Party.

For a period at least from 1898 to 1911, Temple was secretary of the Political Committee of the Constitutional Club. In a club debate with Arthur Steel-Maitland on reform of the House of Lords in 1911, he spoke in favour of an elected Senate.

== Works ==
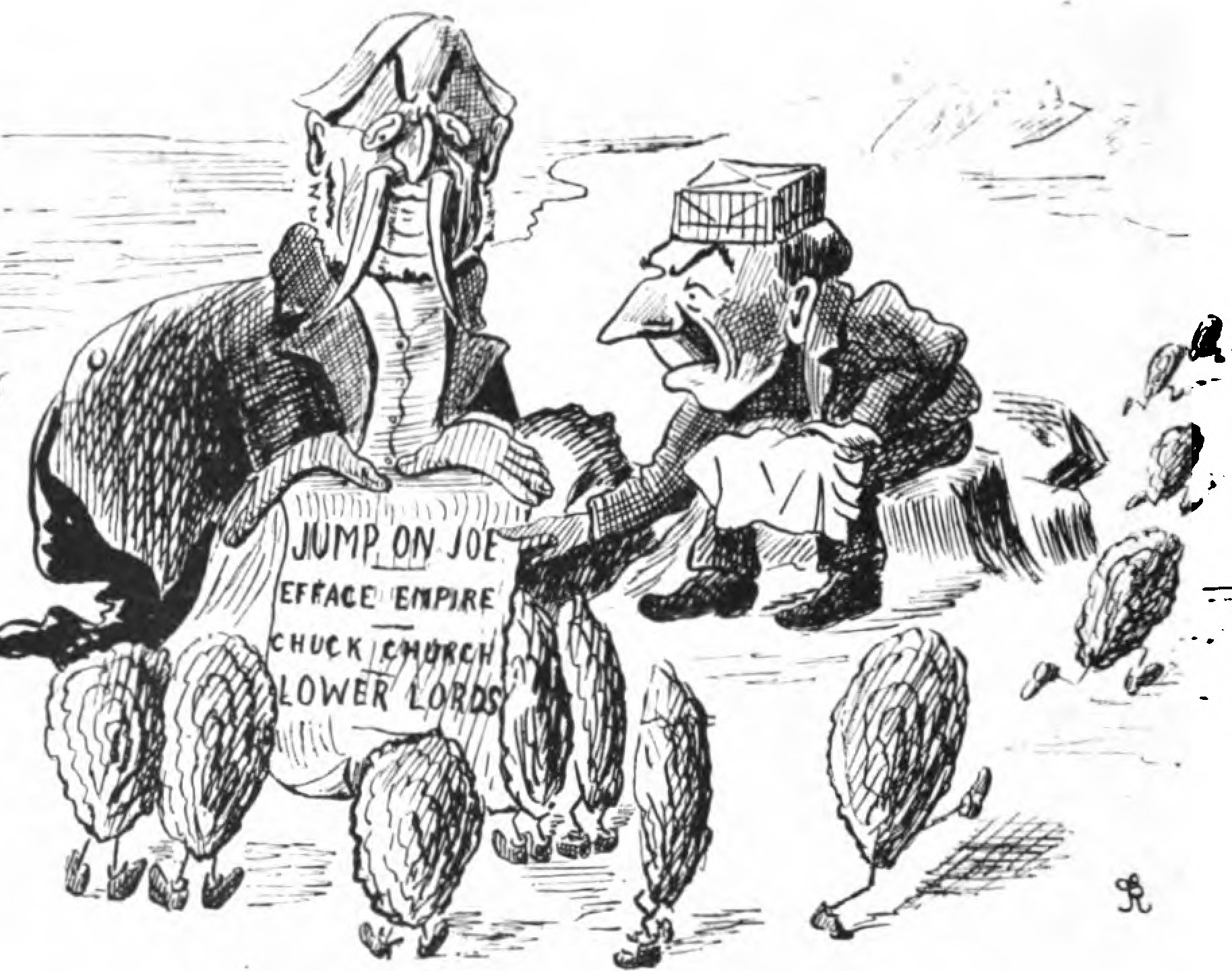
Illustration from Clara in Blunderland, representing Sir William Harcourt as the Walrus, after a Tenniel engraving for The Walrus and the Carpenter by Lewis Carroll

- Clara in Blunderland (1902), with Harold Begbie and Stafford Ransome. Political satire, published under the collective pseudonym Caroline Lewis. There was a sequel, Lost in Blunderland: The Further Adventures of Clara (1903). The satire stemmed in part from the handling of the Second Anglo-Boer War by the Conservative government. Begbie and James Stafford Ransome (1860–1931) were other journalists. "Clara" represents Arthur Balfour, picking up on a nickname from his college days at Cambridge. A cast of characters from the "Alice" books by Lewis Carroll were modelled on Conservative and Liberal politicians of the day, with Joseph Chamberlain as the Red Queen.
- The Coronation Nonsense Book (1902, attributed to the Poet and Painter of Clara in Blunderland)
- Shallowdale: Ourselves, Our Friends and Our Village (1922), novel

With R. W. Barnett, Temple wrote the words to the patriotic song "What is Our Own We'll Hold", set to music by Charles K. Harris and performed by Leo Stormont. Stormont's performances of it with "Rule Britannia", at the Tivoli Theatre, dressed as an admiral, were part of the upsurge of anti-German feeling in the aftermath of the Kruger telegram of January 1896.

== Kriegspiel ==
The invention of the Kriegspiel chess variant is attributed to Temple, prompted by the suggestion in 1898 mooted by members of the Knight Lights Club that they should play a "wargame". The club's interests were chess and acrostics, and they met in the Cock Tavern on Fleet Street, London, a public house frequented by journalists. Interest in actually playing Kriegspiel seems to have awaited the outbreak of the Boer War in 1899. He is cited as Henry Michael Temple (1862–1928) in the Oxford Companion to Chess. The name is taken from the German Kriegsspiel, and the underlying concept is said to be of Swiss origin, in 1811.

== Family ==
Temple married in 1908 Margaret Ellen E. Ferrar, daughter of William Grey Ferrar, MICE, and sister of the Rev. William John Ferrar who married them at Bethnal Green.
