= James Campbell of Stracathro =

Scottish businessman and politician (1790–1876)

James Campbell
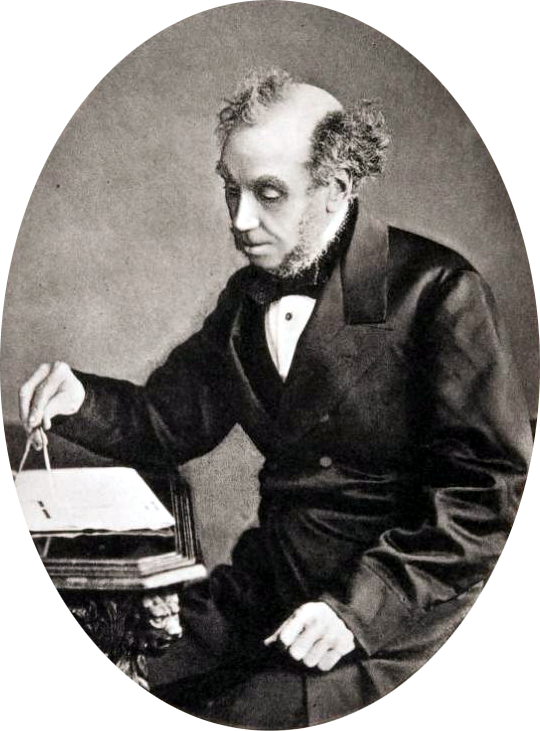
- from Memoirs and portraits of one hundred Glasgow men
- Born: 1790
- Died: 10 September 1876 (aged 85–86)
- Education: Businessman
- Title: James Campbell

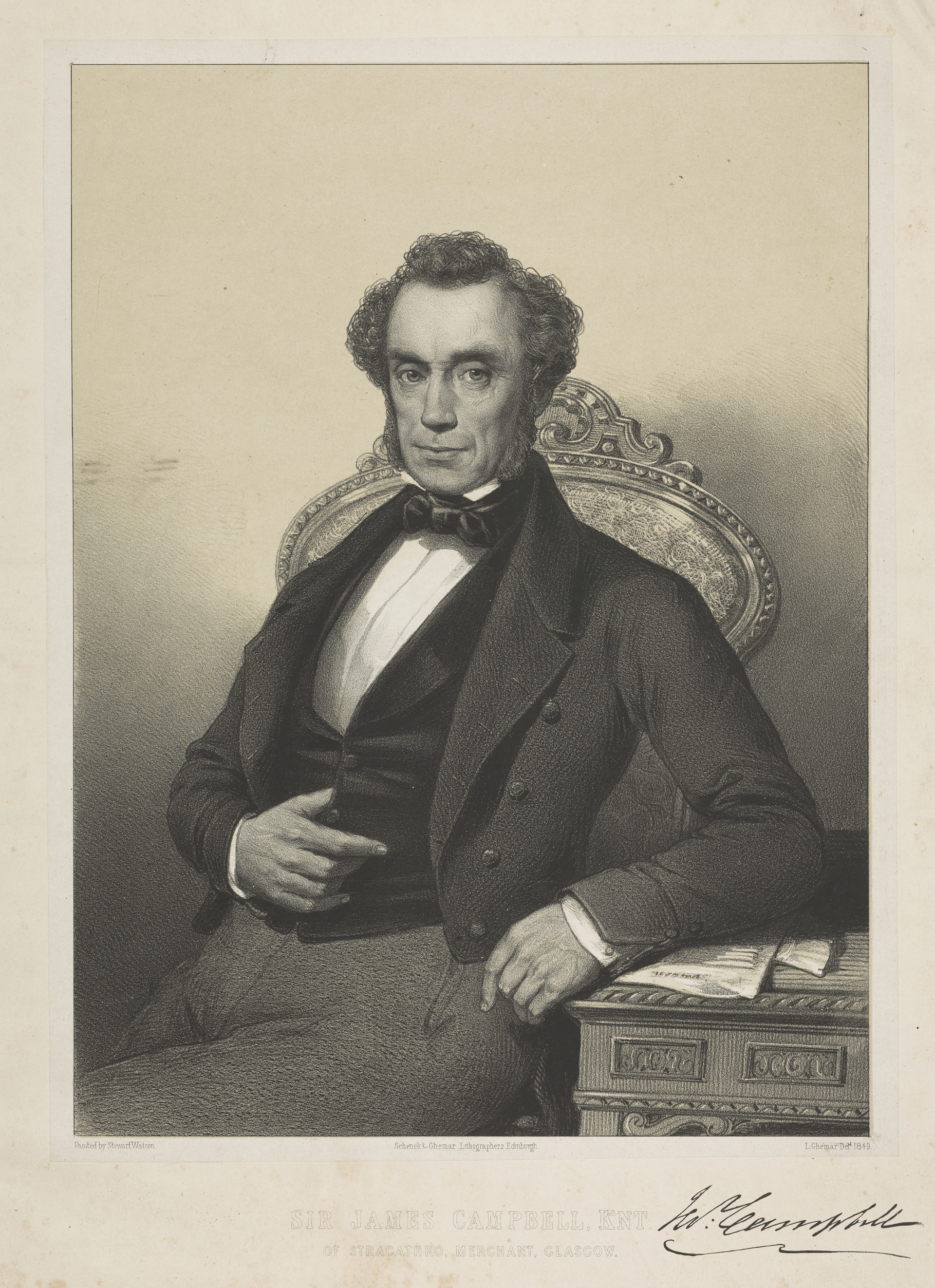
Sir James Campbell of Stracathro

View of Tullichewan Castle which was photographed by James

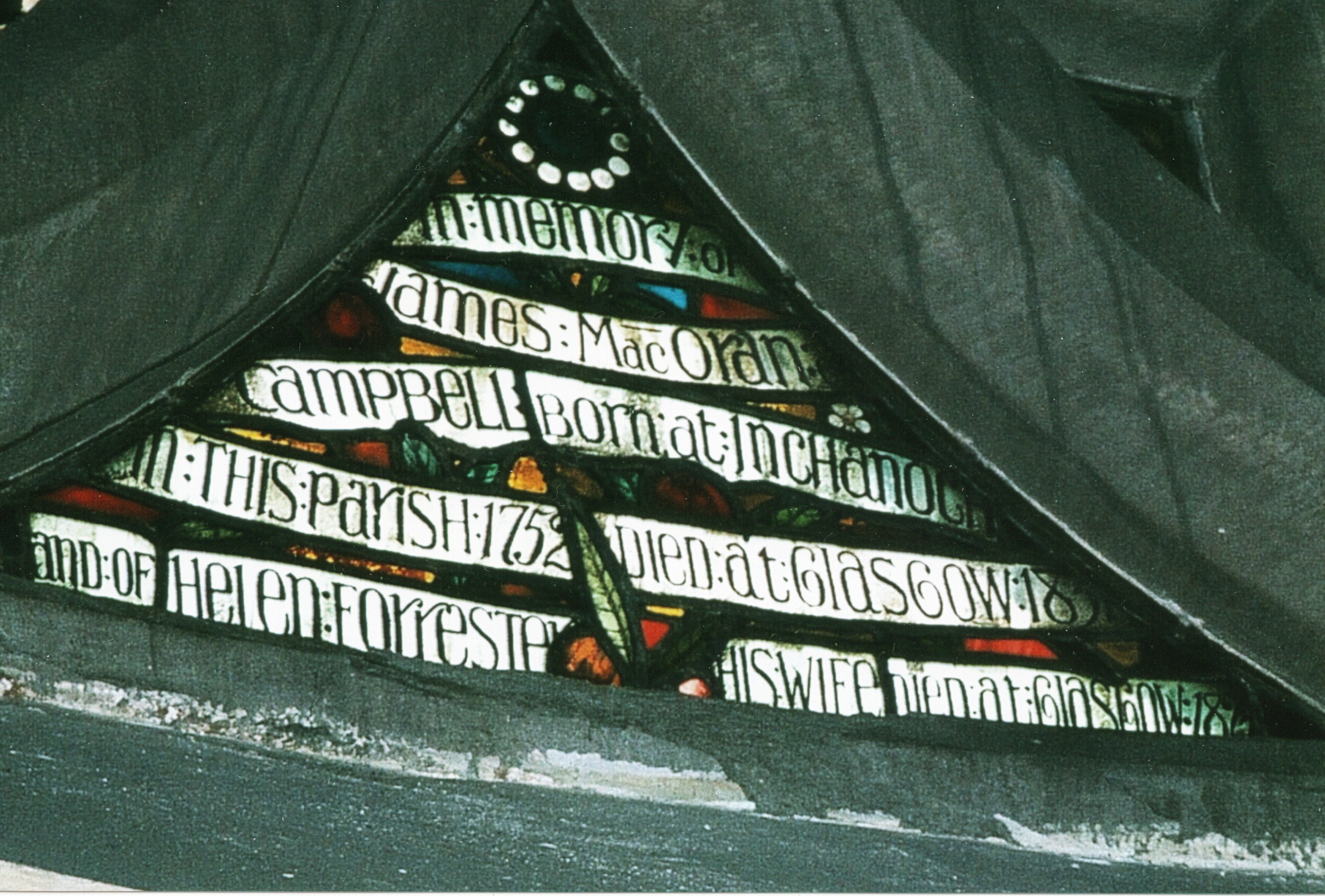
Father James McOran-Campbell Stained Glass Window, Port of Mentieth Kirk, funded by his sons James and William

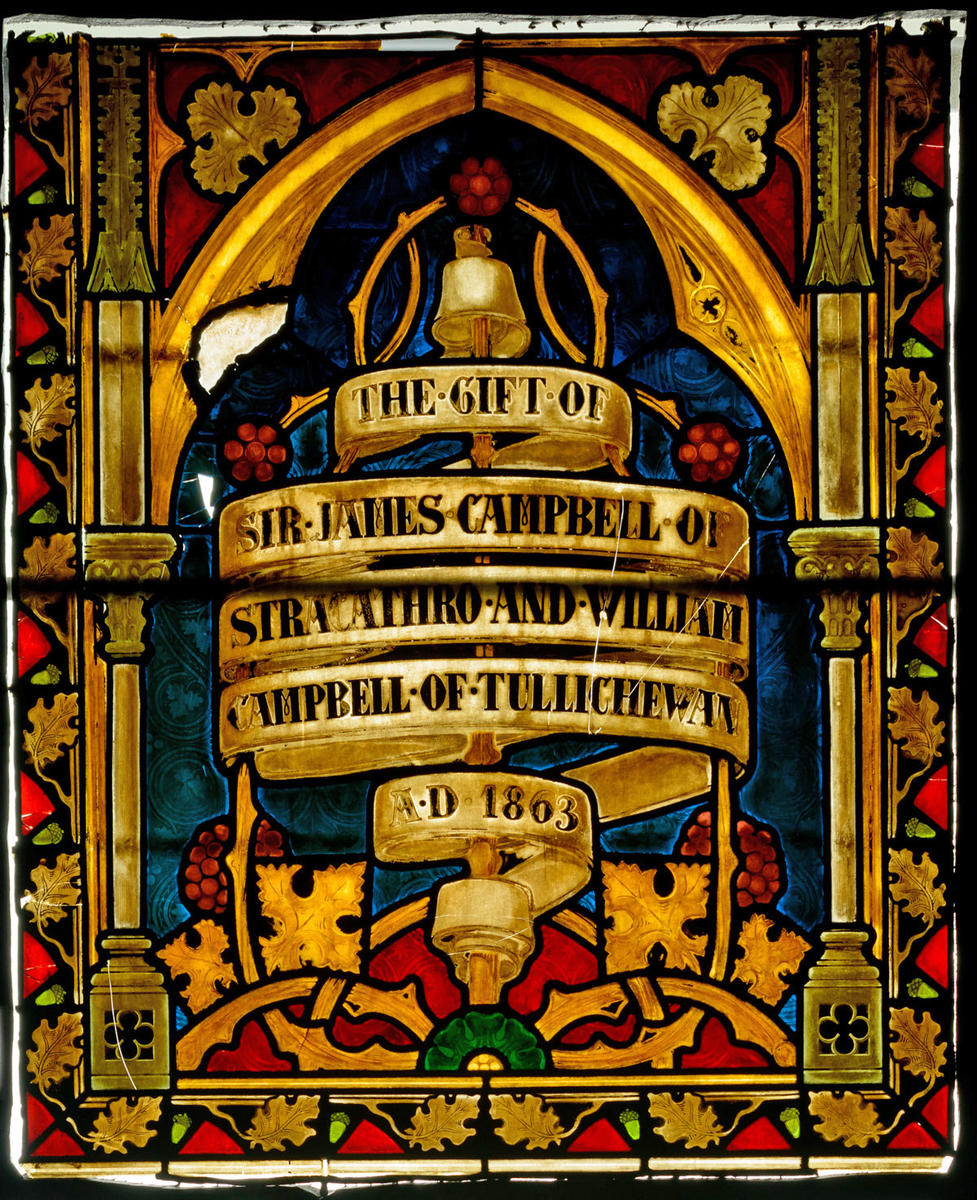
Stained glass window below a picture of Joseph in Glasgow Cathedral gifted by the Campbells

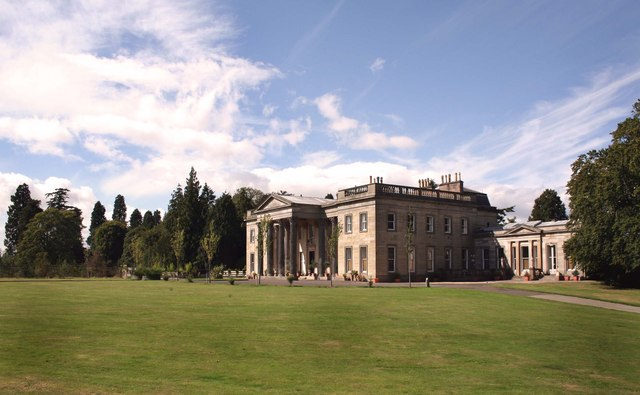
Stracathro House

James Campbell (1790–1876) was a Scottish businessman and politician. With his brother William Campbell, he formed company called "J. & W. Campbell & Co., General Warehousemen." James was the father of Henry Campbell-Bannerman, prime minister of the United Kingdom.

== Ancestry and early life ==
James Campbell was the second son of a family of nine, and was born in 1790, on the farm of Inchanoch, near the Port of Monteith, in Perthshire, where his father, James McOran, was tenant of a farm on the Gartmore estate. The family tradition was the following:- About the year 1660, a young Campbell of Melfort, in Argyllshire, who had got into trouble at home, came to the Menteith district under the assumed name of McCoran or McOran. He was received into service by the Earl of Menteith, who knew his history, and was soon appointed to the charge of the Earl's household. He afterwards married a niece of Haldane of Lanrick, and was settled by the Earl on the farm of Inchanoch. There he and his descendants lived, bearing in Menteith the name of McOran; but when any of the family migrated to settle elsewhere, they resumed the old Clan name of Campbell. In consequence of some arrangements between the proprietors of Gartmore and Rednock, leading to an exchange of lands, including Inchanoch, James McOran in 1805 surrendered his lease and migrated with his wife and family - the family consisting of four sons and four daughters - to Glasgow, where, in accordance with the family rule, they arrived, not as McOrans, but as Campbells.

The eldest son, John, went to America, leaving James the eldest of the sons remaining in Glasgow. The third son, Alexander, died unmarried in 1822. The fourth, William, afterwards of Tullichewan later went into business with James.

After some short time at school, James was apprenticed to McLachlan & McKeand, warehousemen, High Street, the former of whom had known the family at the Port of Menteith, and now proved a warm friend to them in Glasgow.

== Early business in Glasgow ==
In 1810, at twenty years of age, he entered partnership in a clothier business with Matthew Paterson. The firm had been Paterson & Scott, but now became Paterson & Campbell, 163 Trongate. This arrangement came to an end in 1812. He afterwards carried on business alone, as a clothier, at 41 Brunswick Place, under the firm of James Campbell tertius & Co. In 1817 he disposed of that business in order to join his brother William Campbell, under the new firm of J. & W. Campbell & Co.

In these different changes James Campbell was guided by the advice and enjoyed the support and substantial assistance of his old masters, Mr. McLachlan and Mr. McKeand. They advanced the capital which enabled the new firm to begin business, and they were partners with them for the first three years.

The firm opened at 5 Saltmarket. They seem originally to have contemplated chiefly a trade with hawkers, but it soon branched out into a general wholesale and retail drapery or dry goods business. In 1820 the brother Alexander was assumed as a partner, and for two years, until his death in 1822, the style of the firm was J., A., & W. Campbell & Co. In 1823 the business was removed to new premises at 34 Candleriggs Street, where it continued for a generation. The retail department occupied the first floor; the wholesale the premises behind, which were added to from time to time as the business grew; and the manufacturing departments the upper floors. An additional retail department was opened in the Prince of Wales' Buildings, Buchanan Street, in 1841, but owing to the extension of the wholesale business the retail departments both in Candleriggs Street and Buchanan Street were disposed of, and the firm moved to new premises at 29 (later 137) Ingram Street in 1856, where the business, wholesale exclusively, was continued.

== Political life ==
Mr. Campbell also took his part in political life.

He was amongst the most active of those who arranged for the banquet to Sir Robert Peel, in January, 1837, on the occasion of that statesman coming to Glasgow to be installed as Lord Rector of the university. He was one of the deputation (the others being ex-Provost Dalglish, Mr. Thomas Dunlop Douglas, and Mr. Leckie Ewing) who carried the invitation to Sir Robert. The deputation travelled by postchaise, and one of the incidents they had afterwards to relate was that they did not allow the carriage wheels to be washed, so that they might arrive at Drayton Manor with the mud of their journey bearing witness to their haste and eagerness. He stood as a candidate for the Parliamentary representation of Glasgow, in the Conservative interest, in 1837, and again in 1841. He was unsuccessful, but he bore the disappointment with perfect equanimity. He continued to take a warm interest in politics, but this did not interfere with his being on the best of terms with men of all classes of his fellow-citizens.

He received the honour of knighthood in 1842, as Lord Provost, on the occasion of the birth of the Prince of Wales.

== Church at the Disruption ==
Being in municipal office in 1843, he could not but have some prominent share locally in the ecclesiastical agitations of that year, as the Church of Scotland was split in what is known as the Disruption. James, contrary to his brother William, adhered to the Church of Scotland, and took much interest in the appointment of ministers to the seven (out of ten) City charges in Glasgow which were left vacant by secessions - the Town Council being then patrons of the City churches. He also took an active part in the organization and progress of the Lay Association in aid of the Schemes of the Church, and of the Endowment Scheme under Professor James Robertson.

== Residences and last years ==
Sir James' residence in Glasgow was at 129 Bath Street, later the offices of the School Board. The house was built by him in 1829. It was at that time in the westernmost part of the street: any houses farther west, in that part of the town, excepting those about Blythswood Square, were suburban villas.

His practice for many years was to rent a country house for the summer months. His country quarters in 1836 were Kelvinside House, opposite the present Botanic Gardens. The house in Bath Street was shut up for the summer, and the family and whole belongings removed to what was then the country.

Another of James' characteristics was his interest in farming. The tastes of his early years clung to him all his life through. He was able to gratify to the full his love of country occupations on his purchase of the estate of Stracathro, Forfarshire, in 1847. Here, also, his constructive talent found scope for its exercise, in the erection of farm-steadings and other buildings, in which respect he contributed not a little to the general improvement which has taken place in the farm buildings of that part of Forfarshire.

In his later years, however, as the infirmities of age increased, he resided almost wholly at Stracathro, where he died on 10 September 1876, in his eighty-seventh year.

== Family ==
In 1822 he married Janet, daughter of Henry Bannerman, Esq., Manchester, who predeceased him in 1873.

He was survived by two sons:

- James Alexander, elected 1880 as M.P. for the Universities of Glasgow and Aberdeen
- Henry (who assumed the additional name of Bannerman in 1872, in accordance with the will of an uncle), who was M.P. for the Stirling Burghs from 1868, and became Prime Minister of the United Kingdom.

They also had 4 daughters: Jane, Helen, Mary and Louisa.
