= Charlotte Campbell-Bannerman =

Wife of British Prime Minister (1832–1906)

Lady Campbell-Bannerman
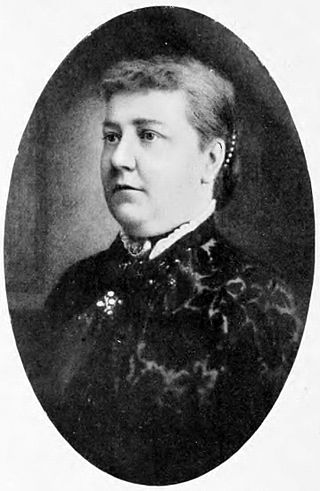
- c. 1881
- Born: Sarah Charlotte Bruce; 10 May 1832
- Died: 30 August 1906 (aged 74); Marienbad, Kingdom of Bohemia, Austria-Hungary (now Mariánské Lázně, Czech Republic)
- Known for: Spouse of the prime minister of the United Kingdom (1905–1906)
- Spouse: Henry Campbell-Bannerman (m. 1860)

Sarah Charlotte, Lady Campbell-Bannerman (née Bruce; 10 May 1832 – 30 August 1906) was the wife of British Prime Minister Henry Campbell-Bannerman.

== Early life and marriage ==
She was the daughter of Major-General Sir Charles Bruce, KCB, Governor of Portsmouth, and his wife Charlotte, daughter of James Forbes, of Hutton Hall, Essex, and Kingairloch, Argyll. She married the future prime minister on 13 September 1860, at All Souls Church, Langham Place, London. The couple had no children.

In early married life, her parties in Grosvenor Square, London were regarded as events of importance, and during the winter at Belmont Castle, Meigle, Perthshire she and her husband received their friends and neighbours for many years. She guided and influenced her husband throughout their marriage to a considerable degree. Intelligent and cultured, she speedily mastered many subjects and was an instinctively shrewd judge of character. Sir Henry discussed with her all the crises which arose in his political life, and she became closely associated with all her husband's plans, jealously guarding his interests and resenting the least supposed slight to his reputation. Her aspirations for his success compensated for his lack of ambition. Years later he told John Morley that Charlotte's contentment was more important to him than his life. However, she was content to remain comparatively unknown, appearing on few public platforms and taking no open part in her husband's electioneering campaigns.

In 1884, Sir Henry accepted the Chief Secretaryship for Ireland only at her urging, despite Rosebery writing to tell him it was "the most disagreeable post in the public service".

== Personal life and death ==
Lady Campbell-Bannerman, described as a rather plain, stout woman, was well-versed in art, and the couple frequently spent their holidays in visiting their old châteaux of France. Belmont, their much-loved Scottish home, was full of ancient French furniture and curios obtained during their frequent visits to the Continent. She spoke French fluently and, like her husband, was well-versed in French literature. She was very fond of Belmont, and in her later years was wheeled about the beautiful grounds in her bath chair. Fruit, flowers, and vegetables were regularly sent south during her residence in London, and a choice bloom of her favourite flower, a white gardenia, was posted to her daily. At Belmont, she and the prime minister walked together in the grounds when state duties permitted him some breathing space, and the evenings were spent quietly in her boudoir. Physically the couple, both reportedly enormous eaters, each weighed nearly 20 stone (130 kg; 280 lb) in later years.

Lady Campbell-Bannerman was racked by illness in the last years of her life. She had to curtail her social duties and her role as adviser to her husband. She was too ill to take her place by his side when he attained the prime ministership, although she was able to join him when he retired to Belmont after his 1906 election victory, taking part in the welcome which had been organised by his aides and constituents. He thought of taking time out of his political activity to be with her, but she dissuaded him from this, and early in 1906 they left their Belgrave Square townhouse to move into 10 Downing Street. As her illness grew increasingly painful and debilitating, her husband nursed her with tender care and anxious devotion through every crisis. He readily acknowledged to the King's Private Secretary, Sir Francis Knollys, that the time and energy he constantly gave to his wife meant that he neglected his prime-ministerial duties. He knew this was not right, but he could do no other.

She hardly ever left 10 Downing Street, except for a visit to Dover in May, which left her with an attack of influenza. On 8 August, shortly after the House of Commons adjourned for the summer recess, the couple left for Marienbad, where Lady Campbell-Bannerman died in her sleep at 5 pm on 30 August 1906, aged 74, her husband by her side. The immediate cause of death was exhaustion, as she had taken no food for three days. Two days later, a funeral was held for her, attended by King Edward VII, and she was buried in Meigle churchyard on 5 September. As a sign of his devotion, the prime minister had inscribed on his wife's memorial tablet in Meigle church the following words of Tasso's: "their hearts were as one".

The death of his beloved wife was a severe blow to the Prime Minister, from which he never fully recovered, emotionally or physically. Shortly after Charlotte's death, he suffered the first of a series of progressively more serious and damaging heart attacks. Each time he appeared to have made a rapid and full recovery, but a particularly sharp and debilitating one came in November 1907. He resigned the following April and died later that month, less than two years after his wife. He is buried next to his wife.

== Legacy ==
Her papers are held at the National Archives at Kew.

== Sources ==
- "Bannerman, Sir Henry Campbell-". Oxford Dictionary of National Biography (online ed.). Oxford University Press. doi:10.1093/ref:odnb/32275. (Subscription, Wikipedia Library access or UK public library membership required.)
- "Death of Lady Campbell-Bannerman. The King's Sympathy". The Times. London. 31 August 1906. p. 4.
- Johnson, Paul, ed. (1989), The Oxford Book of Political Anecdotes, Oxford University Press
- "Sir Henry Campbell-Bannerman", Gov.uk
