= National Conservative Club =

London gentlemen's club

The National Conservative Club was a short-lived political London gentlemen's club founded in 1886. It was aligned to the Conservative party, with members having to pledge support. It was launched as a rival to the mass-membership National Liberal Club of the opposing Liberal party, but proved highly unsuccessful. According to Whitaker's Almanack, it had 2,500 members in 1890, but at a third of the National Liberal Club's membership, this was less than expected, and the NCC closed before the end of the century.

== See also ==
- List of London's gentlemen's clubs
