= Harold Begbie =

English journalist and writer

- Portrait by Walter Stoneman, c. 1916
- Born: Edward Harold Begbie; 1871
- Died: 8 October 1929 (aged 57–58); Ringwood, Hampshire
- Occupation: Journalist

Edward Harold Begbie (1871 – 8 October 1929), was an English journalist and the author of nearly 50 books and poems. Besides studies of the Christian religion, he wrote numerous other books, including political satire, comedy, fiction, science fiction, plays and poetry.

== Early career ==
Begbie was born in 1871, the fifth son of Mars Hamilton Begbie, rector of Fornham St Martin, Suffolk. Though initially a farmer, Begbie moved to London and worked for the Daily Chronicle and later the Globe. In addition to children's literature, he wrote popular works of poetry. He was a close friend of journalist Arthur Mee. When Mee embarked on his Children's Encyclopædia in its initial fortnightly serial form, he gave to Begbie the task of writing a series on "Bible Stories".

At the outbreak of World War I Begbie wrote a number of recruiting poems and visited America on behalf of his paper.

== Views ==
=== Political ===
In 1902 and 1903, Begbie, together with J. Stafford Ransome and Michael Henry Temple wrote, under the pseudonym Caroline Lewis, two parodies based on Lewis Carroll's Alice in Wonderland and Through the Looking-Glass, entitled Clara in Blunderland and Lost in Blunderland. These novels deal with British frustration and anger about the Boer War and with Britain's political leadership at the time.

By 1916, dismayed by the attacks being made on Lord Haldane by Leopold Maxse in the National Review, he began to question the government's domestic policy. In 1917, he publicly defended the rights of pacifists and conscientious objectors to oppose the war.

Before the First World War Begbie was an outspoken Liberal social reformist, but he moved rapidly to the right in the post-war period. In a series of books written under the pseudonym "Gentleman with a Duster", he denounced sexually suggestive literature (such as the early plays of Noël Coward), lamented the precarious economic state of the middle classes and the prospective disintegration of the British Empire, and called for a strong hand against left-wing subversives even if this meant restricting some traditional British liberties.

=== Religious ===
Begbie had a strong religious bent: he was involved in the Oxford Group (which later became Moral Re-Armament) and with the Salvation Army. His concern with social reform appeared strongly in his book The Little that is Good (1917), where he wrote about charitable work among the poor of London. He raised large sums of money for East End charities.

Begbie might be described as a Broad Church Anglican, who was interested in the ways in which modern science seemed to cast doubt on materialism by showing matter was more complicated than previously believed. He was hostile to Anglo-Catholic Ritualism and to Roman Catholicism; several pre-First World War novels portray Ritualists as sinister and dishonest crypto-Catholic conspirators. His 1914 book The Lady Next Door, however, supports Irish home rule and gives an idealised portrayal of Catholicism in Ireland as a genuinely popular religion. His hostile view of urban industrial society in Belfast was criticised by many Ulster Unionists including the writer St. John Ervine.

In the preface to the American edition of his book The Glass of Fashion (1921), Begbie attacked Darwinism. However, he was not anti-evolution. In his book The Proof of God (1914), he endorsed theistic evolution.

Begbie strongly defended the reality of the alleged apparition of the Angels of Mons and attacked Arthur Machen for claiming they derived from his story "The Bowmen". Begbie printed numerous accounts of the "Angels" in his book On the Side of the Angels (1915) but these are generally anonymous, second-hand or otherwise unverifiable. However, war regulations prevented naming of military personnel.

=== Vegetarianism ===
Begbie converted to vegetarianism and was the editor of Arnold Hills' magazine The Vegetarian from 1898 to 1900. In 1902, Begbie returned to meat-eating and authored an anti-vegetarian satire.

== Death ==
Begbie was ill for some time and died at his residence in Ringwood, Hampshire on 8 October 1929. He requested cremation with no funeral service and commented that "no stone or monument of any kind to be erected over my ashes". After his death, it was publicly revealed by his publisher Charles Boon that he was the author of the book The Mirrors of Downing Street who had used the pseudonym "The Gentleman with a Duster". Boon stated that it was "one of the most closely guarded literary secrets in my experience of publishing".

== Works ==
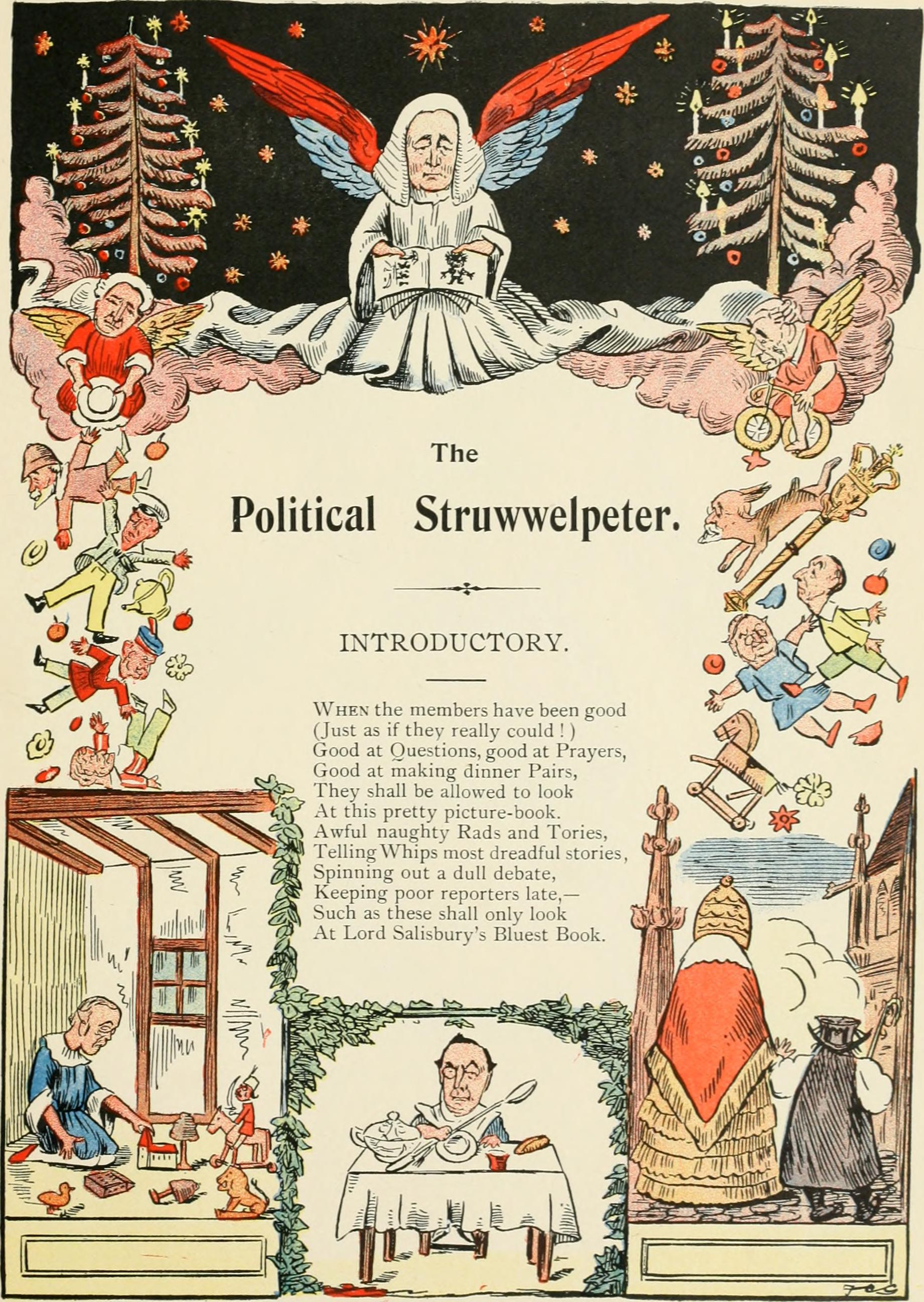
The Political Struwwelpeter (1899)

Besides the "Gentleman with a Duster" books, Begbie wrote Broken Earthware, Other Sheep, In the Hands of the Potter, and Life of General Booth, a book about William Booth. He also wrote a novel, The Great World, which was published in September 1925 by Mills & Boon and acted as ghostwriter for the memoir of the polar explorer Ernest Shackleton.

- The Political Struwwelpeter, 1898
- The Story of Baden-Powell: 'The Wolf That Never Sleeps', 1900
- Bundy in the Greenwood, 1902
- Clara in Blunderland, 1902 (New edition 2010, ISBN 978-1-904808-49-7)
- Lost in Blunderland, 1903 (New edition 2010, ISBN 978-1-904808-50-3)
- On the Side of the Angels, 1915
- The Life of William Booth, the Founder of the Salvation Army, 1920
- The Bed-Book of Happiness, 1914
- The Proof of God, 1914
- The Vindication of Great Britain, 1916
- Twice Born Men: A Clinic in Regeneration (A Footnote in Narrative to Professor William James's 'Varieties of Religious Experience'), 1909
- The Mirrors of Downing Street: Some Political Reflections by a Gentleman with a Duster, 1921
- The Glass Of Fashion: Some Social Reflections by A Gentleman With A Duster, 1921 (G. P. Putnam's Sons)
- Shackleton: A Memoir, 1922 (Mills & Boon)
- Painted Windows: Studies in Religious Personality, 1922
- Seven Ages: A Brief Narrative of the Pilgrimage of the Human Mind as It Has Affected the English Speaking World, by a Gentleman with a Duster, 1923
- The Laslett Affair, 1928
- Everychild: A Christmas Morality published by James Clarke & Co; 13 & 14 Fleet Street, London, E.C. (no date given)
