= William Campbell of Tullichewan =

Scottish draper (1793–1864)

William Campbell
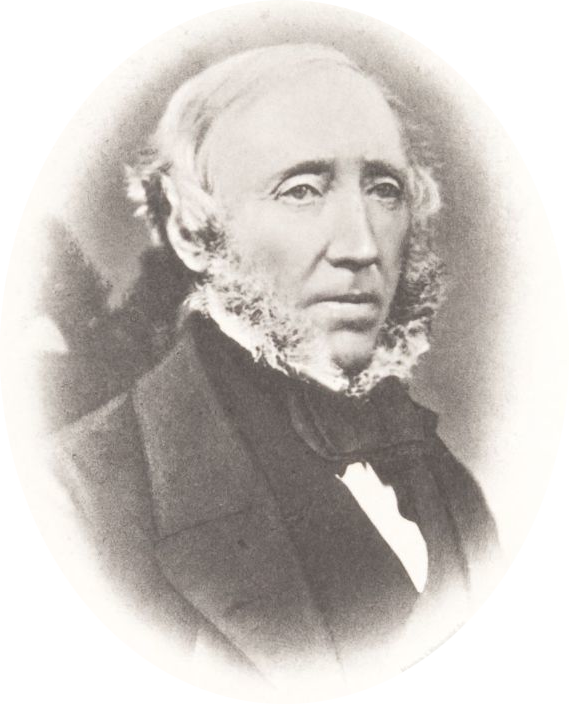
- from Memoirs and portraits of one hundred Glasgow men
- Church: Church of Scotland; Free Church of Scotland

Personal details
- Born: 1793
- Died: 1864 (aged 70–71)

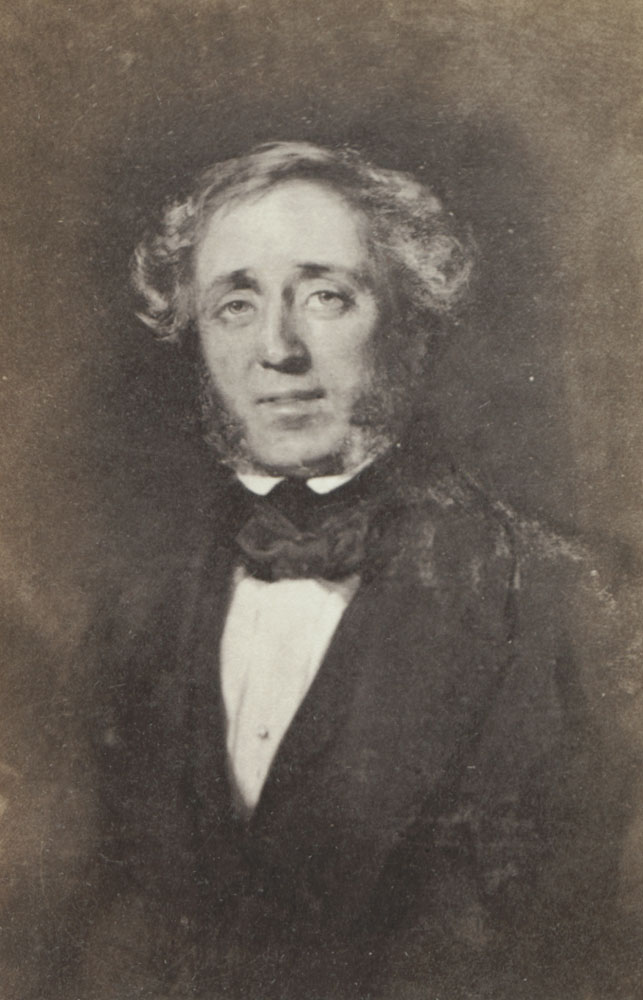
William Campbell of Tullichewan by Thomas Annan after Sir Daniel Macnee

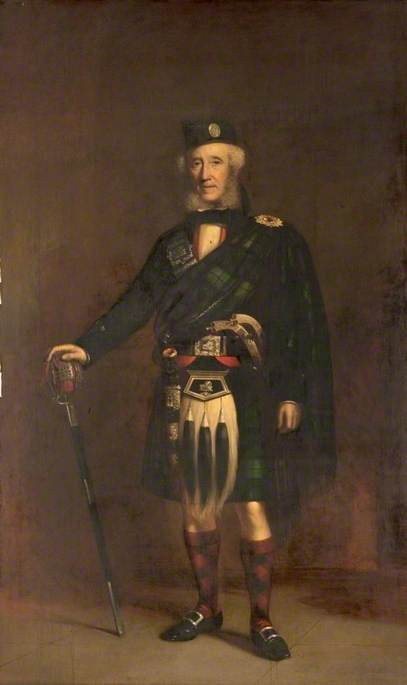
William Campbell of Tullichewan by Underhill

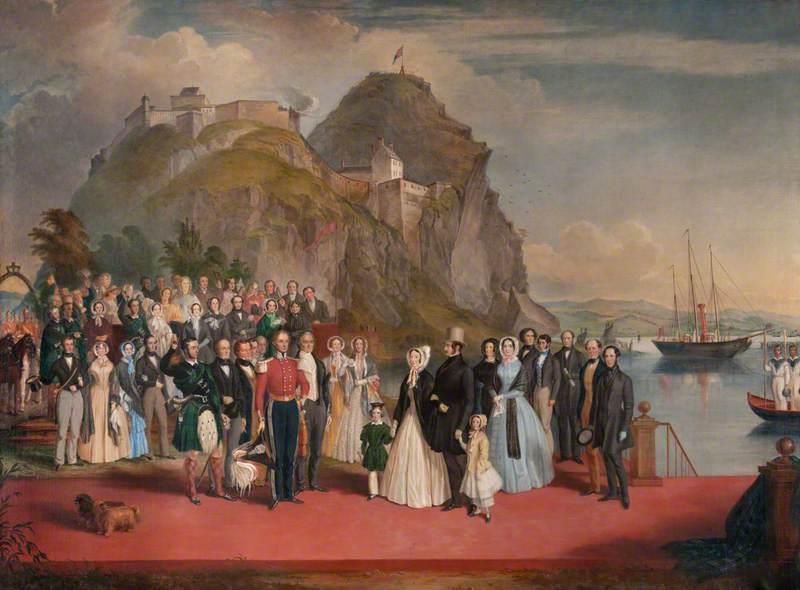
Landing of Queen Victoria at Dumbarton by James Hope Stewart

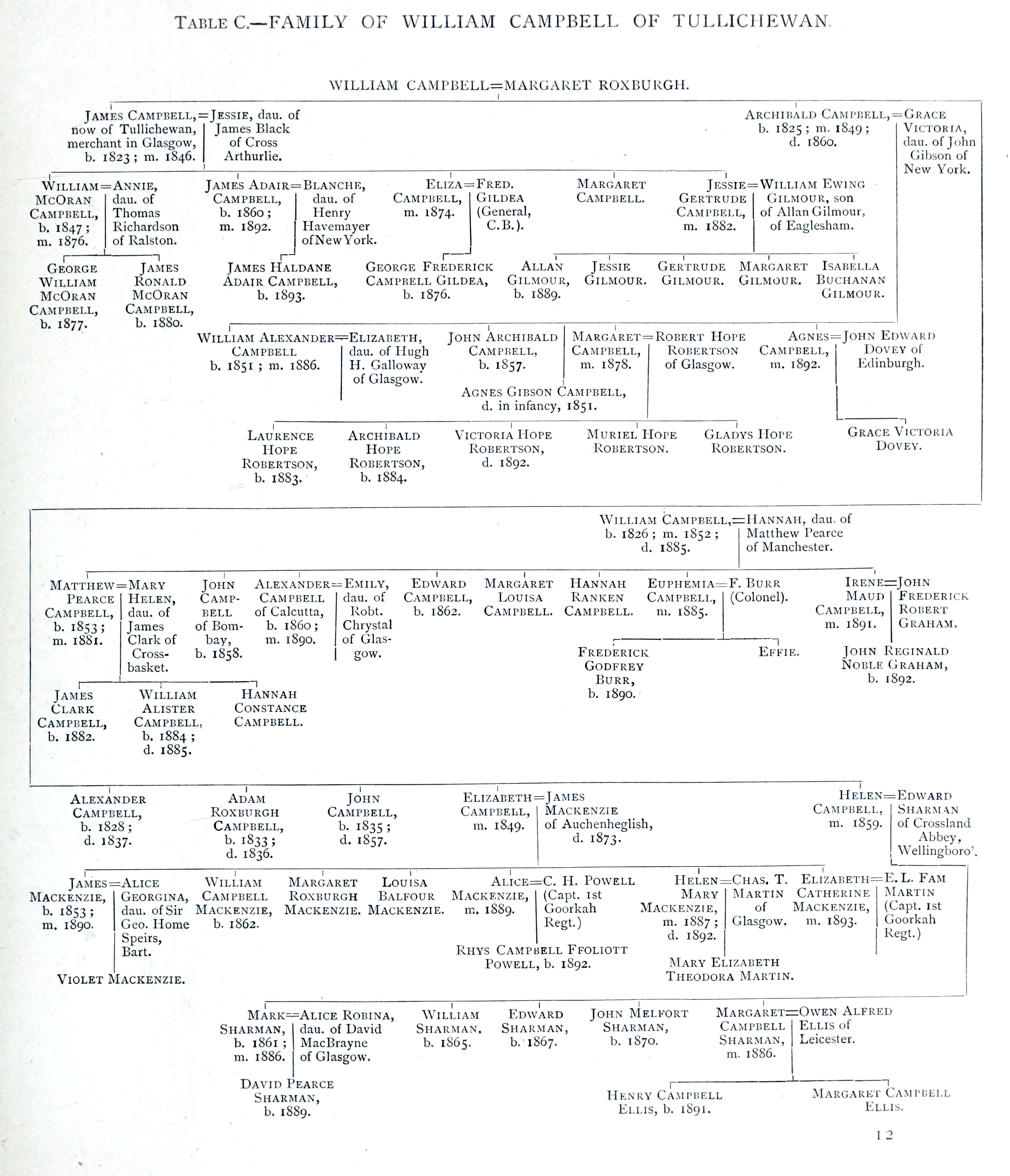
William Campbell of Tullichewan family tree

View of Tullichewan Castle

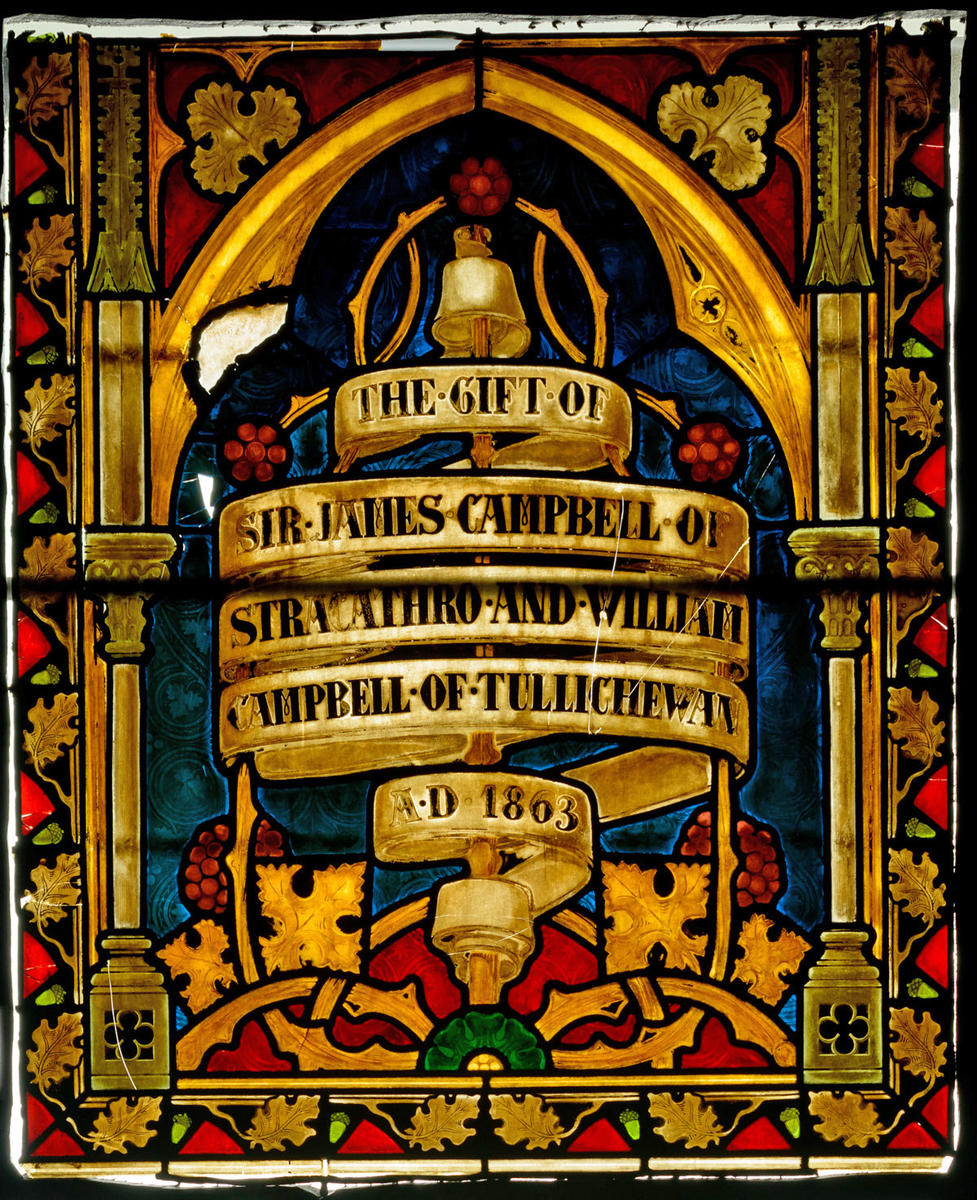
Stained glass window below a picture of Joseph in Glasgow Cathedral gifted by the Campbells

William Campbell (1793––1864) was a Scottish draper, businessman and philanthropist. With his brother, James, he formed company called "J. & W. Campbell & Co., General Warehousemen." The company grew over many years and formed an international business. Having made his fortune William bought Tullichewan Castle, and continued to work while giving generously to philanthropic projects.

== Early life and education ==
William Campbell was the fifth child of a family of nine, and was born in 1793, on the farm of Inchanoch, near the Port of Monteith, in Perthshire, where his father, James McOran, was tenant of a farm on the Gartmore estate. The family was known in the district by the name of McOran. They claimed descent from the Campbells of Melfort, and resumed their old name of Campbell on settling in Glasgow. William's mother Helen, was daughter of John Forrester of Frew, near Kippen, a farm tenanted by her family from the Earls of Moray for more than three hundred years. All the schooling, strictly so called, which he ever got, he received at the parish school. William Campbell was a grandson of James Campbell, Esq. of Ashentree, Perthshire, a cadet of the Melfort branch of the Argyll Campbells.

== Glasgow and work ==
In 1805, when he was about eleven or twelve years of age, his father moved with his family to Glasgow, with the view of finding in that centre of industry suitable employments for his children. In order to give him a thorough practical knowledge of goods, he was taught weaving; and in due time, after having thus far qualified himself, he entered the employment of Mr John Craig, who at that time carried on a Scotch cloth business in the High Street, near the Cross. Here he remained for some years, in the course of which he secured for himself the good-will and patronage of several influential friends. Offers of assistance were made him and he (having now attained the age of twenty-two) resolved to start in business on his own account. His first place of business was situated in the Saltmarket, and consisted of a flat, one stair up, of an old tenement in an unfashionable locality. The building has since been demolished, in order to make way for London Street. Here he was very successful. The warehouse was crowded from morning till night. The tide of prosperity flowing on and increasing, until the business had outgrown the ability of any single individual personally to superintend it, his brother, James Campbell of Stracathro, and sometime Lord Provost of the city, brought his talents and business habits to his help. A partnership was formed between the two brothers, and the firm was, conducted under the name of "J. & W. Campbell & Co., General Warehousemen." Under their joint management the same extraordinary success as before continued to attend them, until every flat and attic of the old tenement being turned to use, they were compelled to contemplate the necessity of leaving the too contracted premises, and seeking more commodious accommodation elsewhere. In this needful step their pace was quickened in consequence of the condemnation by the public authorities of several old houses, among which was "Campbell's warehouse in the Saltmarket." They got notice to quit it in fifteen months. This of course subjected them to great inconvenience and anxiety. But, they in due time secured a property in Candleriggs, on which they undertook to erect a suitable warehouse. And so concerned were they to lose no time, that the builder, after the first floor was built, gave them a floor a week, and the firm speedily moved into their new and spacious premises. But in process of time even these became too narrow for them, and they were obliged ultimately to take refuge in the palatial warehouse now occupied by them in Ingram Street, which became a the centre of an extensive commerce with all parts of the world.

== Residences ==
Mr Campbell's successive family residences, like the successive warehouses in which his business was carried on, indicated the progressive improvement of his temporal circumstances, until ultimately he became the proprietor of Tillichewan Castle, with its surrounding grounds. Thomas Chalmers was a frequent visitor to Tullichewan and Prince Albert passed through in 1849.

== Family ==
In June 1822, Mr Campbell married Margaret, second daughter of Archibald Roxburgh, merchant and had issue-

- James was born on 31 March 1823.
- Archibald
- William
- Alexander
- Adam
- John
- Elizabeth
- Helen

== Church and philanthropic work ==
Unlike his brother, James Campbell, William was not specially interested in public life. He was at one time elected as Town Councillor; but as the duties had no fascination for him, he soon retired. As a citizen of Glasgow he has been remembered as a philanthropist by several charitable institutions which he supported.

He assisted to found and continued to support the Night Asylum for the Houseless, and he took especial interest in the Royal Infirmary, the Indigent Gentlewomen's Fund, and the City Improvement Scheme. The Royal Botanic Garden was beyond the power of being enjoyed by the working classes during the Fair week, the very time when the pent-up crowds of Glasgow were able to take advantage of its walks and open spaces, as it was in want of funds. He contributed £500 on condition that it might be open to the public during the great annual holiday.

At the Disruption, William, unlike his brother James, left the Church of Scotland and joined with the Free Church. William, who was an elder in the Free Church, was an intimate friend of Thomas Chalmers. Millburn Free Church and its adjoining place of sepulture, at the north end of Renton, owe their origin to the Disruption of 1843, which rent asunder the Church of Scotland. In May 1845, William convened a meeting in the Star Hotel in George Square with Free Church Ministers to discuss establishing “an Academic Institution in the City”. As a result of this meeting, The Glasgow Academy was formed. In 1845 William Campbell, laird of Tullichewan, erected at his own expense the elegant small Gothic chapel of Millburn—which was adorned with a fine ornate steeple—and also secured ample burial ground nearby. The church was opened on 14 December 1845. In May, 1846, the church was sanctioned as a separate charge.
