= Prime Minister of the United Kingdom =

Head of government

Prime Minister of the United Kingdom of Great Britain and Northern Ireland
- Royal arms of His Majesty's Government

- Flag of the United Kingdom

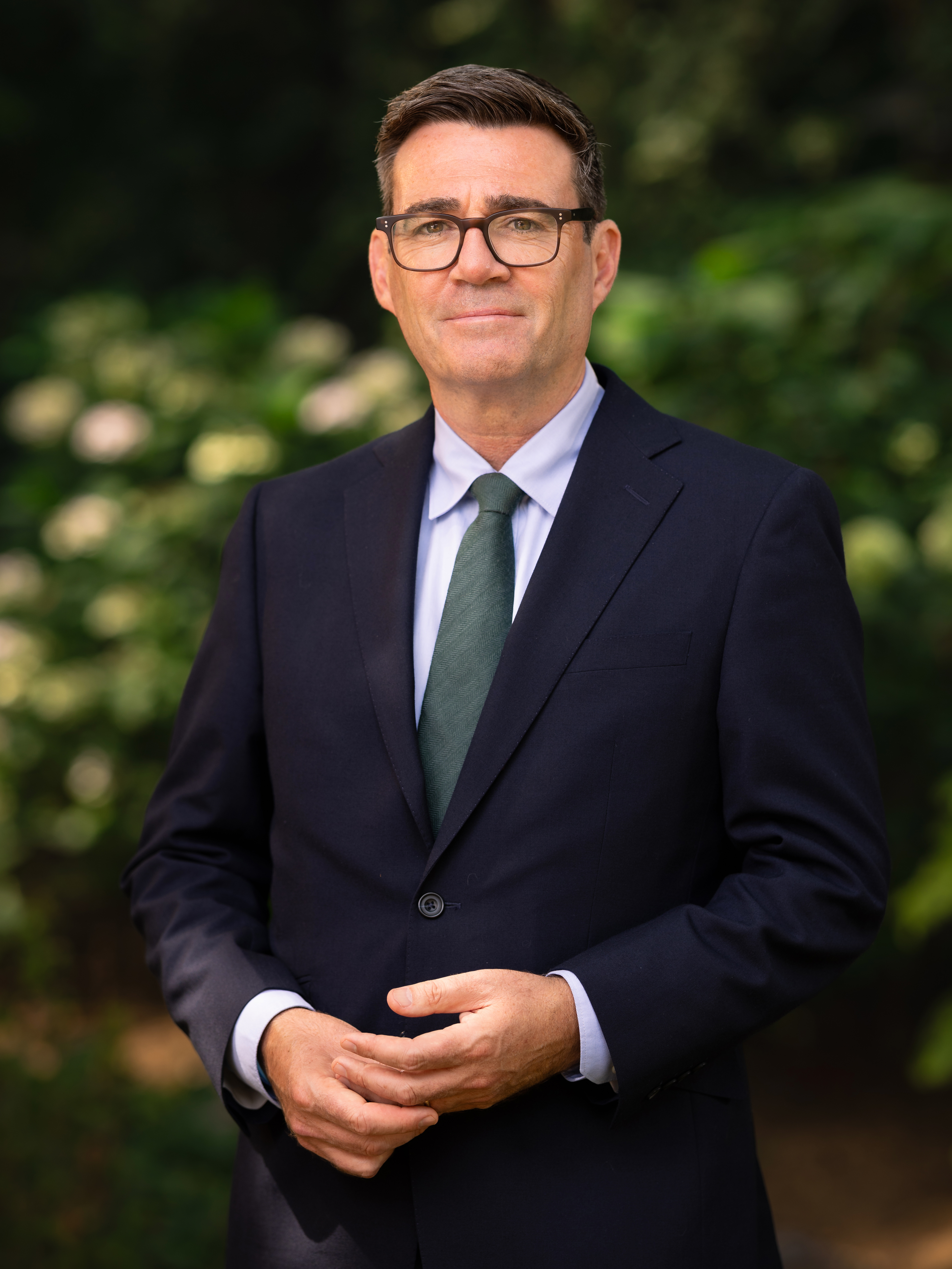
- Incumbent; Andy Burnham since 20 July 2026
- Government of the United Kingdom; Office for the Prime Minister and Cabinet; Cabinet Office
- Style: Prime Minister (informal); The Right Honourable (formal); His Excellency (diplomatic)
- Type: Head of government
- Status: Chief Minister of the Crown; Great Office of State
- Member of: Cabinet; Privy Council; British–Irish Council; National Security Council; Council of the Nations and Regions; PM and Heads of Devolved Governments Council
- Reports to: Monarch; Parliament
- Residence: 10 Downing Street (official); Chequers (country house)
- Appointer: The Monarch; (with their choice limited to the person who can command the confidence of the House of Commons)
- Term length: At His Majesty's pleasure
- First holder: Robert Walpole
- Deputy: No fixed position; often held by: Deputy Prime Minister; First Secretary of State
- Salary: £166,786 per annum (2024) (including £91,346 MP salary)
- Website: gov.uk/government/organisations/prime-ministers-office-10-downing-street

The prime minister of the United Kingdom is the head of government of the United Kingdom. The prime minister advises the sovereign on the exercise of much of the royal prerogative, chairs the Cabinet, and selects its ministers. Modern prime ministers hold office by virtue of their ability to command the confidence of the House of Commons, so they are invariably members of Parliament.

The office of prime minister is not established by any statute or constitutional document, but exists only by long-established convention, whereby the monarch appoints as prime minister the person most likely to command the confidence of the House of Commons. In practice, this is the leader of the political party that holds the largest number of seats in the Commons. The prime minister is ex officio also First Lord of the Treasury (an office often associated with the premiership between 1721 and 1895, after 1902 always united to it, and, after 1905, an official title of the position), Minister for the Civil Service, the minister responsible for national security, and Minister for the Union. The prime minister's official residence and office is 10 Downing Street in London.

The power of the prime minister depends on the support of their respective party and on the support of the country at large. The appointment of cabinet ministers and granting of honours are done through the prime minister's power of appointment. The prime minister, alongside the cabinet, proposes new legislation and decides on key policies, which are then passed by an act of parliament.

The power of the office of prime minister has grown significantly since the first prime minister, Robert Walpole in 1721. The prime minister was originally viewed as the primus inter pares ("first among equals"). Prime ministerial power evolved gradually alongside the office itself, and the prime minister has played an increasingly prominent role in British politics since the early 20th century. During the premierships of Margaret Thatcher and Tony Blair, prime ministerial power expanded substantially, and their leaderships in the office were described as "presidential" due to their personal wielding of power and tight control over their cabinet. The prime minister is one of the world's most powerful political leaders in modern times. As the leader of the world's fifth largest economy, the prime minister holds significant domestic and international leadership, being the leader of a prominent member state of NATO, the G7 and G20.

As of 2026, 59 people (56 men and 3 women) have served as prime minister, with the first, Walpole, taking office on 3 April 1721. The longest-serving prime minister was also Walpole, who served over 20 years, and the shortest-serving was Liz Truss, who served seven weeks. The current prime minister is Andy Burnham who has held the office since 20 July 2026.

== History ==
=== Origins: 1689–1742 ===
The position of prime minister was not created but evolved slowly and organically over three hundred years through numerous Acts of Parliament, political developments and accidents of history. The office is therefore rarely found in any statute and, according to the Political and Constitutional Reform Committee in 2014, "It is impossible to point to a single point in history when the post was created or even a decision to create it."

The 17th century saw a transformative period in British history. The Union of the Scottish and English crowns followed by the Wars of the Three Kingdoms, including the English Civil War, saw the final conflict between the Monarchy and the parliaments (of England and Scotland) over governance, culminating in the end of absolute monarchy with the execution of Charles I in 1649. In 1660, the Monarchy was restored with the accession of Charles II, signalling a return to royal rule, albeit with growing limitations. The Glorious Revolution of 1688–1689 led to the deposition of the Catholic James II and the establishment of William III and Mary II as constitutional monarchs. After a series of bills passed by the parliaments, such as the Bill of Rights and Claim of Right in 1689, the powers of the monarch were reduced, being replaced by the powers of parliament. The Bill of Rights established the supremacy of Parliament over the Crown and set up certain civil rights. During this period, Parliaments were dominated by two political factions: the Whigs and the Tories. The Whigs supported parliamentary sovereignty and constitutional monarchy while the Tories favoured the divine right of kings and the deposed James II. These two groups were considered by some to be "embryonic political parties."

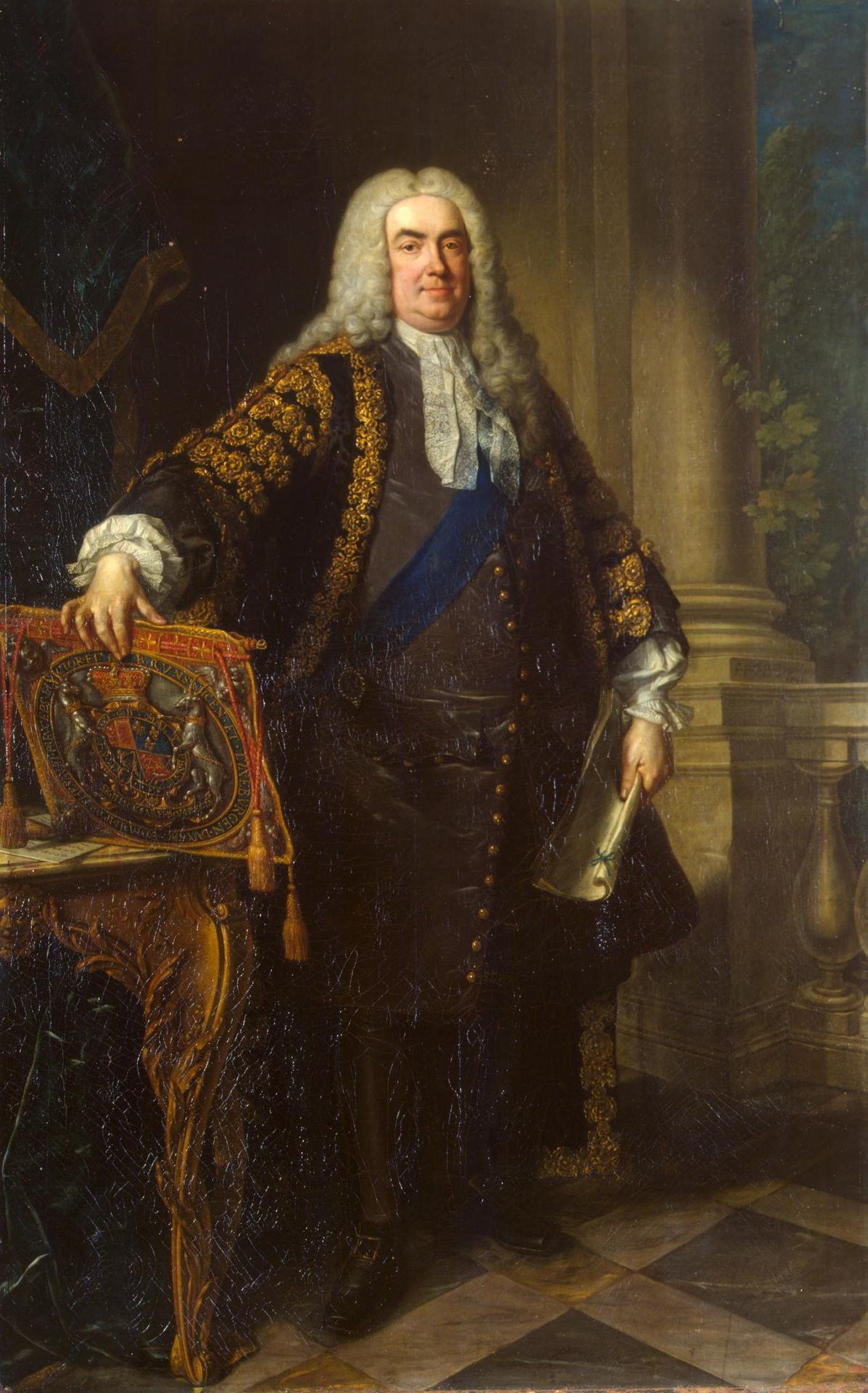
Robert Walpole was the first to hold the position of Prime Minister.

The resulting English Constitution established in 1689 gave the English Parliament the power over the "purse" or the Treasury. The monarch, who could now commit to and follow agreed policy, allowed Parliament to pursue and fund its own policies without fear of diversion of funds. By this point, the Monarch was forced by incentive to cede power to Parliament under the credible threat of removal of any who ignored the Constitution.

The Acts of Union in 1707 formed the Kingdom of Great Britain, with the Parliament of Great Britain. The head of Treasury, as Lord Treasurer, was given the power following Standing Order Number 66 to draft money bills (budgets) instead of MPs outside of government. The informal term 'prime minister' was first recorded around that time, which, since 1721, had mostly also been the office holder for the First Lord of the Treasury. The First Lord of the Treasury is one of the Lords Commissioners of the Treasury. This role is usually held by the prime minister. The role of prime minister grew more distinct as the head of government and often more recognisable within the public than other members of the cabinet, which demonstrates the increasing power of the prime minister in modern times than that originally created.

Following the death of Queen Anne in 1714, Parliament invited George Louis, Prince Elector of Hanover to become king. During his reign, he was unpopular partly due to his limited English proficiency and lack of interest in governing, a role he largely left to his ministers. In 1720, the South Sea bubble, a financial crisis stemming from speculative investments, led to economic turmoil. The collapse implicated many government officials. Schisms within the Whigs Party led to the fall of Stanhope–Sunderland ministry. Subsequently, Robert Walpole, who was serving as Paymaster of the Forces, was appointed First Lord of the Treasury in 1721. Robert Walpole was the first prime minister of the United Kingdom, though his predecessors as First Lord of the Treasury also held a similar position. Walpole is considered the first "de facto prime minister" due to his influence over policy and control of government affairs. He was not, in the modern sense, "prime minister". This was because the position was not formally recognised by any legal fixture and also because the title was originally used as a term of abuse.

Walpole served as prime minister from 1721 to 1742. The time during his premiership was dubbed by historians as the "Robinocracy". His financial abilities in handling the repercussions in the aftermath of the South Sea Bubble earned him the support of commercial and landed interests, pursued a largely peaceful foreign policy, lowered taxes and reduced national debt while his skilful management of Commons affairs solidified his dominance in Parliament by operating as a "Screen-Master General", pulling strings and currying favour whenever necessary. Walpole's policy was to maintain the status quo, and despite not passing any major reforms, Walpole provided the country with much-needed stability after a century of turmoil. His time in office was crucial in shifting political power to the House of Commons and laying the foundations for the modern Cabinet system. Despite being able to successfully hold power for 20 years, Walpole faced fierce opposition over alleged bribery and corruption in Parliament and following a disastrous war with Spain, he resigned in 1742 and was succeeded by the Earl of Wilmington.

=== Development: 1742–1945 ===
Following the resignation of Walpole, a swift string of ministries followed and between 1742 and 1760 there were five separate governments. Spencer Compton, Earl of Wilmington was made prime minister. However, Wilmington served for a brief time and was head of government by name only. The government continued to be dominated by internal struggles over Britain's participation in the War of the Austrian Succession and royal intervention in policy making. In 1743, Henry Pelham became prime minister and sought to expel ministers, particularly Lord Carteret, who sought to undermine the authority of the new ministry.

== Powers and authority ==
=== Executive powers ===
The prime minister is the head of the United Kingdom government. As such, the modern prime minister leads the Cabinet (the Executive). In addition, the prime minister leads a major political party and generally commands a majority in the House of Commons (the lower chamber of Parliament). The incumbent wields both significant legislative and executive powers. Under the British system, there is a unity of powers rather than separation. John Morley described the office of prime minister as the "keystone of the Cabinet arch" that maintained while the prime minister can hold significant power over the executive, it is often exercised collectively through the Cabinet (government).

Ministerial responsibility is also an aspect of a prime minister's executive authority. The prime minister leads the cabinet which makes the holder of that office bear responsibility for the collective conduct of the government. Professor Rodney Brazier points out that since the prime minister wields significant sway over policy, that power must be subjected to the conclusion and input of Cabinet ministers. This prevents the office of prime minister from becoming more dominant and also ensures that executive power is authorised with broader support from and within the government. The prime minister must constantly maintain the confidence of the House of Commons because, as Bagehot notes, the power of the prime minister derives from their ability to command a majority in the House to pass legislation and continue the functions of government. If a prime minister loses the confidence of the House, which occurs in a vote of no confidence, they are often expected to resign from office or request the monarch dissolve parliament to call a general election.

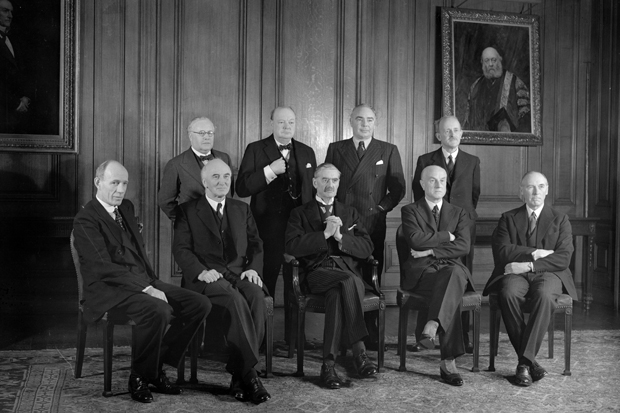
Prime Minister Neville Chamberlain alongside his cabinet on the eve of World War II in September 1939

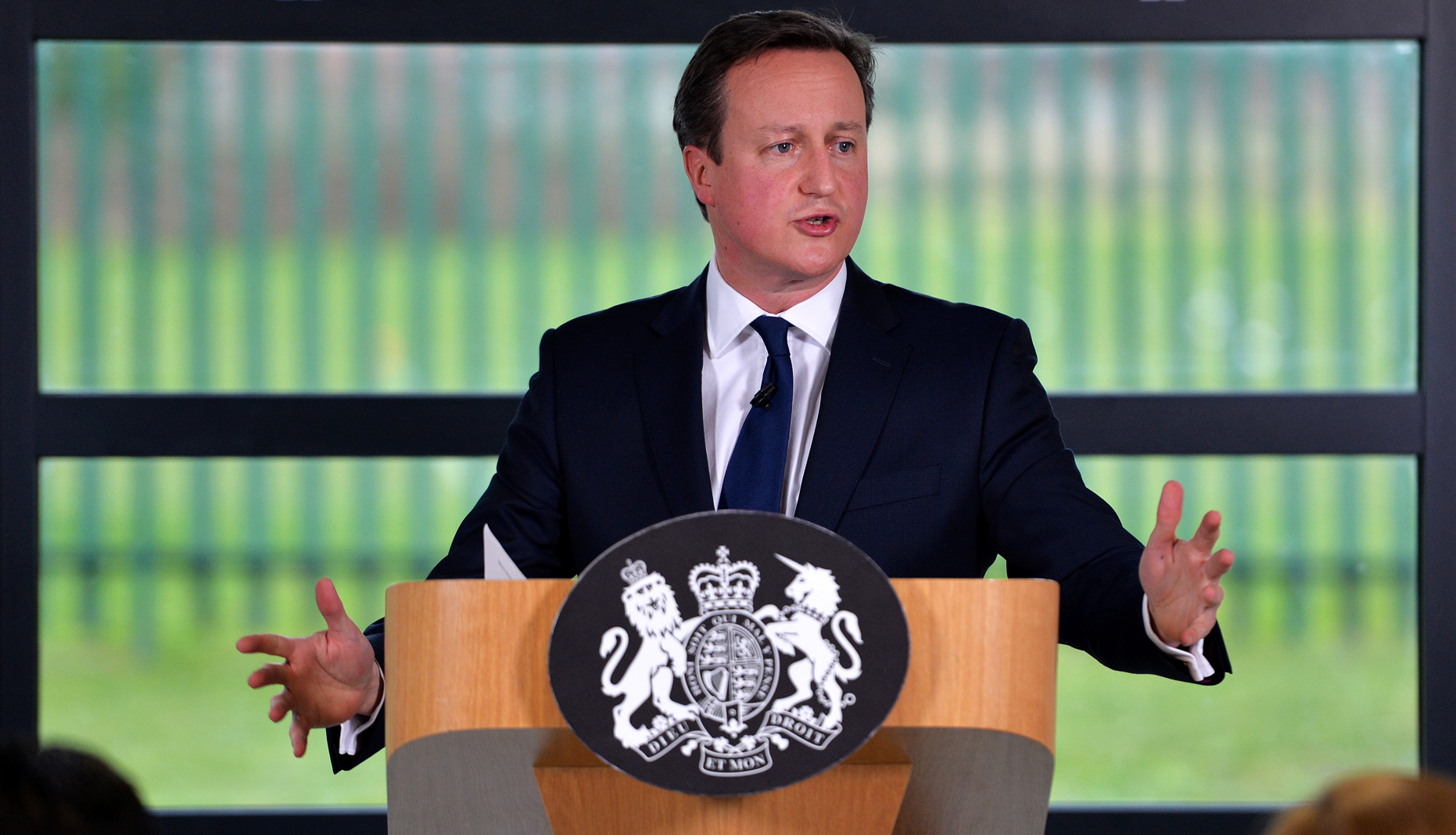
Prime Minister David Cameron announcing the approval of more free schools across the country as a part of his education policy on 9 March 2015

The prime minister acts as the principal advisor to the monarch, who is the head of state, a capacity that has evolved gradually during the history of the office. Bagehot says that despite the monarch holding certain theoretical executive powers, in practice, these powers are often executed upon the advice and recommendation of the prime minister and the cabinet. This is considered a major principle of the "unity of powers" that exists within a constitutional monarchy in which the monarch "reigns but does not rule". According to Brazier, the prime minister advises the monarch on matters such as the dissolution of parliament and appointments to the House of Lords, but these decisions are often made with the consent of parliament.

The prime minister leads the executive in directing government policy and maintaining coordination between government departments which is dependent upon the cooperation and consent of ministers. Foreign policy and national security are areas in which the prime minister has traditionally enjoyed more authority under what are known as prerogative powers. Vernon Bogdanor argues that the abilities to declare war, negotiate treaties and deploy the armed forces have historically been part of the monarch's royal authority but have slowly evolved into a function of the office of prime minister. Despite this, the exercise of the prime minister's prerogative powers in these matters is under the oversight of parliament. It is often by convention that a prime minister must seek the approval of parliament before committing the nation to military action. In addition to this, the prime minister also exerts informal influence over public policy. Brazier notes this is due to the prime minister often being the leader of the largest party in government, therefore having a direct impact in initiating policy both in government and during election campaigns.

=== Legislative powers ===
In the House of Commons, the prime minister guides the law-making process with the goal of enacting the legislative agenda of their political party. In an executive capacity, the prime minister appoints (and may dismiss) all other Cabinet members and ministers, and co-ordinates the policies and activities of all government departments, and the staff of the Civil Service. The prime minister also acts as the public "face" and "voice" of His Majesty's Government, both at home and abroad. Solely upon the advice of the prime minister, the sovereign exercises many statutory and prerogative powers, including high judicial, political, official and Church of England ecclesiastical appointments; the conferral of peerages and some knighthoods, decorations and other important honours.

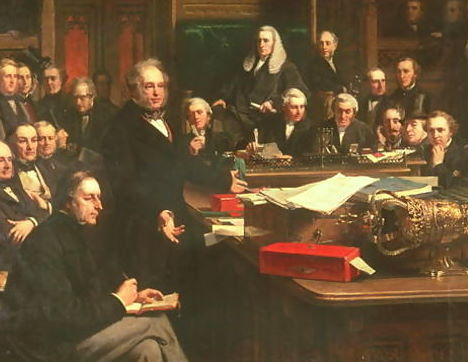
Prime Minister Lord Palmerston during a debate in Parliament over the Cobden–Chevalier Treaty in February 1860

Bagehot identifies the prime minister as the head of the "efficient" part of government that functions within the government to steer legislation through both Houses of Parliament. Although the prime minister does not possess the power to introduce legislation directly, their control of the cabinet and their role as leader of the largest political party in the House of Commons enables them substantial influence over any legislative agenda. Bagehot points out that this power is based on the prime minister's ability to operate the "machinery of government" that allows them to guide legislation that align with their party's political and ideological priorities. Brazier argues that the legislative power of the prime minister has greatly expanded following the post-war period and that as a result, the prime minister now directly authorises supervision over government bills and has a consequential role in the introduction of legislation.

The prime minister is able to wield considerable power in the passing of legislation through their ability to manage party discipline and cohesion in voting patterns. Bogdanor states that this largely depends upon the prime minister being the leader of the largest party in the Commons, which can pass legislation without any or little resistance if they can command the confidence of the House. This aspect of prime ministerial power is informal and often carried out by the office of Whips, who makes sure that MPs remain loyal and vote on the government line. The political scientist Anthony King said that the prime minister's influence over legislation is further solidified through their ability to shape policy before it reaches Parliament. King further argued that the shaping of legislation, on many occasions, involves the collaborative efforts of cabinet ministers and civil servants, but the prime minister's approval is needed to initiate the legislative agenda. King's analysis of contemporary politics showed that some prime ministers often bypass or overrule the cabinet on traditional discussion and to push through their preferred agendas with notable cases such as Margaret Thatcher and Tony Blair.

=== Parliamentary powers ===
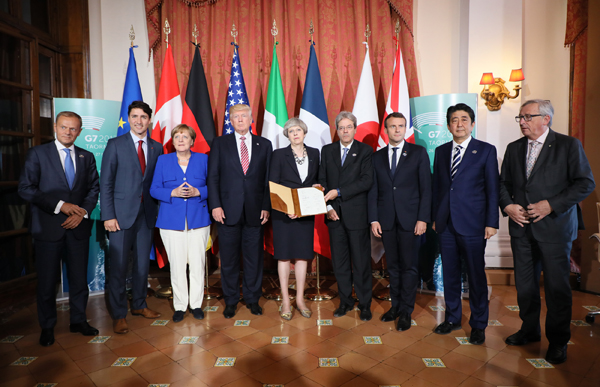
Prime minister Theresa May (in the middle) alongside G7 leaders signing statement against Terrorism at the 2017 Taormina summit

The prime minister's influence in the Houses of Parliament is derived from longstanding conventions and statutes that have gradually evolved through the centuries. The office of prime minister itself is not explicitly mentioned in parliamentary law but is developed by constitutional conventions and therefore it is defined by precedent and tradition. Bogdanor notes that the prime minister's power in parliament is exhibited by their control of the executive (the Cabinet) and their ability to influence the legislative agenda. The ability of the prime minister to influence legislation, according to academic Philip Norton, is often through party discipline and having a reliable majority of MPs who vote in support of the government's priorities.

Another essential part of the parliamentary powers possessed by the prime minister is determining the composition of the Cabinet. According to Professor Robert Hazell, the prime minister not only chooses cabinet members but also dictates the collective decision-making process of members as well. The prime minister most often would chair cabinet meetings and may determine their frequency, thereby controlling the agenda for policy and steering decisions in their preferred direction. Additionally, the prime minister can exercise considerable control over parliamentary time. Authors Alexander Horne and Gavin Drewry state that the prime minister uses this power through the Leader of the House of Commons, by which they are able to allocate time for government bills and often ensuring access to this time over private members' bills.

The prime minister's parliamentary powers also extend to foreign relations. Contemporary historian Anthony Seldon says that the prime minister acts as the main representative of the government in the international sphere, including in parliament, where treaties are ratified and international commitments are debated.

=== Prerogative powers ===
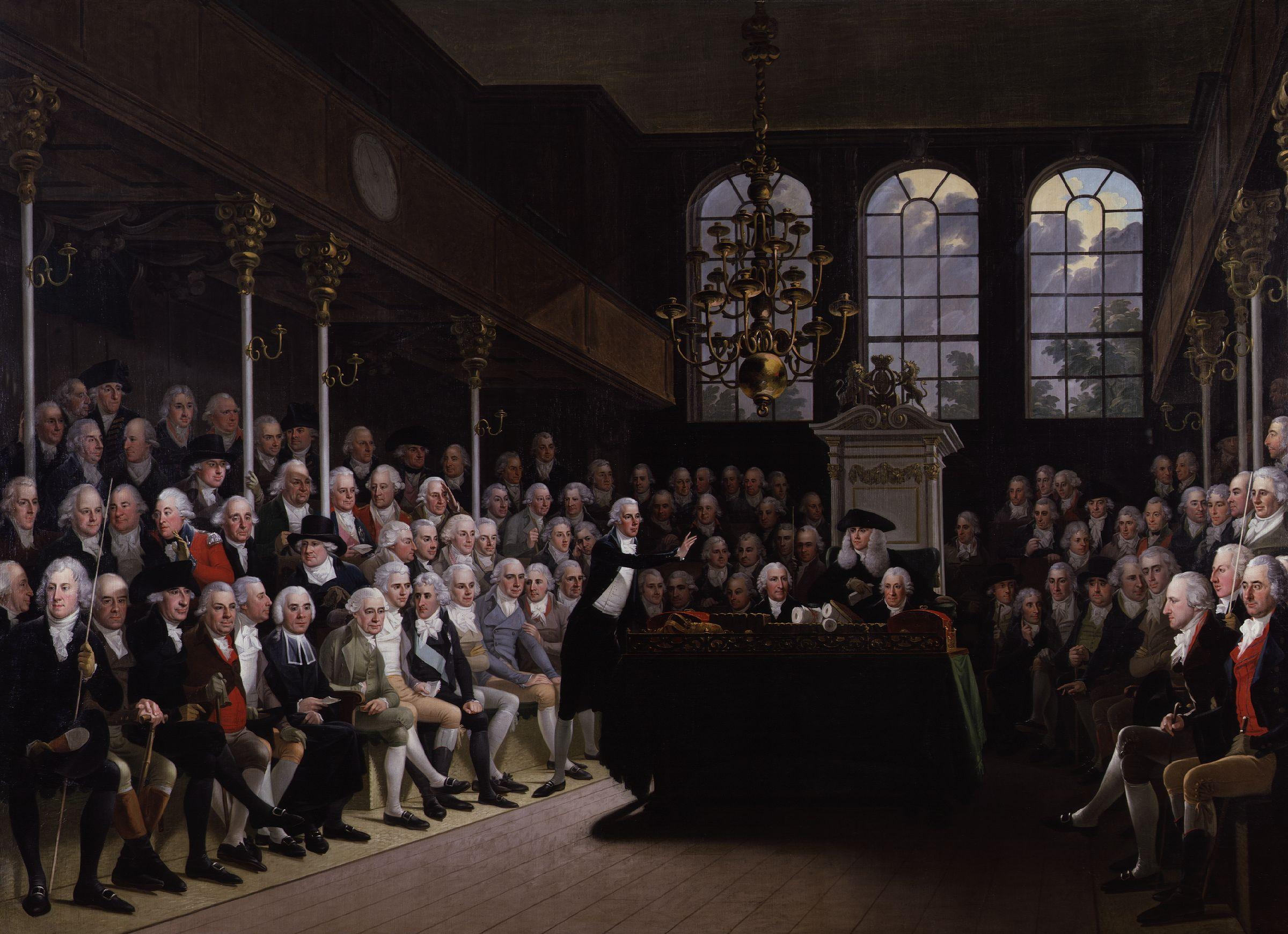
Prime minister William Pitt the Younger addressing the House of Commons on the outbreak of war with France in 1793

The most significant powers given to the prime minister are "prerogative powers". These are a set of constitutional privileges deriving from monarchial authority that have gradually evolved into tools of executive power managed by the prime minister and the government. Bagehot famously called the British system as one where "the executive power is now yielded by the prime minister" rather than the monarch, a shift from personal to political power. Prerogative powers allow the prime minister to act without the immediate or direct consent of parliament, especially in circumstances such as declaring war, deploying troops and granting honours.

Brazier argues that prerogative powers allow the prime minister to act within the "authority of the crown" in situations where neither convention nor statutory law applies. As noted by both Bagehot and Brazier, areas in which the prime minister authorises their given prerogative powers are matters of foreign affairs. In recent occasions, the 2003 invasion of Iraq saw Prime Minister Tony Blair deploying British troops to Saudi Arabia without the immediate consent or approval of parliament. Brazier says the rise of parliamentary and public scrutiny has led to calls for reform and checks on the use of prerogative powers. The only prime minister who did not seek parliamentary or legal consent for military action was Anthony Eden during the Suez Crisis in 1956.

Professors Mark Elliot and Robert Thomas argue that prerogative powers present a constitutional anomaly in the 21st century. Both contend that such powers lack direct democratic legitimacy due to not being regulated by parliamentary statutes and raise concerns over accountability. Elliot and Thomas have pointed out that judicial intervention in cases such as Miller I and Miller II, where the Supreme Court exercised scrutiny over the use of prerogative powers by the government to prorogue parliament during the United Kingdom's withdrawal from the European Union, was successful in keeping check over the authority of both the prime minister and the government. The evolving usage of prerogative powers also has signalled tension between tradition and accountability. Authors Paul Craig and Adam Tomkins state that the absence of a written constitution gives a prime minister greater leeway in employing their given prerogative powers without limits that in turn would create uncertainty although the use of such powers by the prime minister is often constrained by political convention than by law.

== Constitutional background ==
The British system of government is based on an uncodified constitution, meaning that it is not set out in any single document. King makes the point that much of the British constitution is in fact written and that no constitution is written down in its entirety. The distinctive feature of the British constitution, he says, is that it is not codified. The British constitution consists of many documents, and most importantly for the evolution of the office of the prime minister, it is based on customs known as constitutional conventions that became accepted practice. In 1928, Prime Minister H. H. Asquith described this characteristic of the British constitution in his memoirs:

In this country we live ... under an unwritten Constitution. It is true that we have on the Statute-book great instruments like Magna Carta, the Petition of Right, and the Bill of Rights which define and secure many of our rights and privileges; but the great bulk of our constitutional liberties and ... our constitutional practices do not derive their validity and sanction from any Bill which has received the formal assent of the King, Lords and Commons. They rest on usage, custom, convention, often of slow growth in their early stages, not always uniform, but which in the course of time received universal observance and respect.

The relationships between the prime minister and the sovereign, Parliament and Cabinet are defined largely by these unwritten conventions of the constitution. Many of the prime minister's executive and legislative powers are actually royal prerogatives which are still formally vested in the sovereign, who remains the head of state. In 1902, for example, Arthur Balfour said, "The prime minister has no salary as prime minister. He has no statutory duties as prime minister, his name occurs in no Acts of Parliament, and though holding the most important place in the constitutional hierarchy, he has no place which is recognized by the laws of his country. This is a strange paradox". Despite its growing dominance in the constitutional hierarchy, the premiership was given little formal recognition until the 20th century; the legal fiction was maintained that the sovereign still governed directly. The position was first mentioned in statute only in 1917, in the schedule of the Chequers Estate Act. Increasingly during the 20th century, the office and role of prime minister featured in statute law and official documents; however, the prime minister's powers and relationships with other institutions still largely continue to derive from ancient royal prerogatives and historic and modern constitutional conventions. Prime ministers continue to hold the position of First Lord of the Treasury and, since November 1968, that of Minister for the Civil Service, the latter giving them authority over the civil service.

Under this arrangement, Britain might appear to have two executives: the prime minister and the sovereign. The concept of "the Crown" resolves this paradox. The Crown symbolises the state's authority to govern: to make laws and execute them, impose taxes and collect them, declare war and make peace. Before the "Glorious Revolution" of 1688, the sovereign exclusively wielded the powers of the Crown; afterwards, Parliament gradually forced monarchs to assume a neutral political position. Parliament has effectively dispersed the powers of the Crown, entrusting its authority to responsible ministers (the prime minister and Cabinet), accountable for their policies and actions to Parliament, in particular the elected House of Commons.

Although many of the sovereign's prerogative powers are still legally intact, (Note: The Sovereign's prerogative powers are sometimes called reserve powers. They include the sole authority to dismiss a prime minister and government of the day in extremely rare and exceptional circumstances, and other powers such as withholding Royal Assent, and summoning and proroguing Parliament. These reserve powers can be exercised without the consent of Parliament. While formally discretionary, the exercise of these powers is heavily limited by convention.) constitutional conventions have removed the monarch from day-to-day governance, with ministers exercising the royal prerogatives, leaving the monarch in practice with three constitutional rights: to be kept informed, to advise and to warn.

== Modern premiership ==
=== Appointment ===
In modern times, much of the process involving prime ministerial appointments is informally governed by constitutional conventions and with the rules and processes described by authoritative sources such as The Cabinet Manual. (Note: Paragraphs 2.7 to 2.20 and 3.1 to 3.2.)

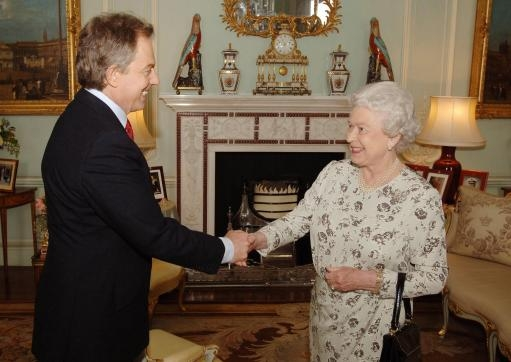
Queen Elizabeth II receiving prime minister Tony Blair after he won a third term in office on 6 May 2005

The prime minister is appointed by the monarch, through the exercise of the royal prerogative. In the past, the monarch has used personal choice to dismiss or appoint a prime minister (the last time being in 1834), but it is now the convention that the monarch should not be drawn into party politics. Bogdanor states that throughout the 18th and 19th centuries, the monarch often appointed the prime minister based on their personal preference, regardless of whether they have great or little public support.

If a prime minister (incumbent or otherwise) leads their party to victory in a general election and gains an overall majority in the House of Commons, they will be invited by the monarch to form a new government. Following the invitation, the prime minister will be driven to Buckingham Palace to meet the monarch. The meeting between the monarch and the incoming prime minister is a moment for the latter to pledge their loyalty to the monarch and be invited to form a new government. The prime minister is expected to bow before the monarch in a ceremony known as "kissing hands". Following this, the prime minister is officially appointed the head of His Majesty's government.

The prime minister "...holds that position by virtue of his or her ability to command the confidence of the House of Commons, which in turn commands the confidence of the electorate, as expressed through a general election." By convention, the prime minister is also an MP and is normally the leader of the political party that commands a majority in the House of Commons. (Note: During the history of the modern office, five men have served as Prime Minister in both the House of Commons and House of Lords; four moved from serving in the Commons to accept a peerage, while the fifth disclaimed his peerage after his appointment and contested a by-election to become an MP.)

=== Prime Minister's Office ===
The Prime Minister's Office helps the prime minister to 'establish and deliver the government's overall strategy and policy priorities, and to communicate the government's policies to Parliament, the public and international audiences'. The Prime Minister's Office is formally part of the Cabinet Office, but the boundary between its work and that of the wider Cabinet Office can be unclear; the wider Cabinet Office might carry out very similar work. Peter Hennessy has claimed that this overall arrangement means there is in fact effectively a Prime Minister's Department, though it is not called this.

The Prime Minister's Office was officially created in 1916 by David Lloyd George during World War I, which marked the first formal recognition of the office of prime minister and established it as an independent institution from other entities within government, with staff to support the coordination of government policy. This development came as a response to the demands of wartime governance, as Lloyd George's leadership needed a more centred and efficient executive function.

=== Prime Minister's Questions ===
Prime Minister's Questions is a constitutional convention, currently held as a single session every Wednesday at noon when the House of Commons is sitting, in which the prime minister answers questions from members of Parliament (MPs). The leader of the opposition usually asks the prime minister six questions, and the leader of the third-largest parliamentary party can ask two questions. It is an occasion when the prime minister appears regularly on live television and radio.

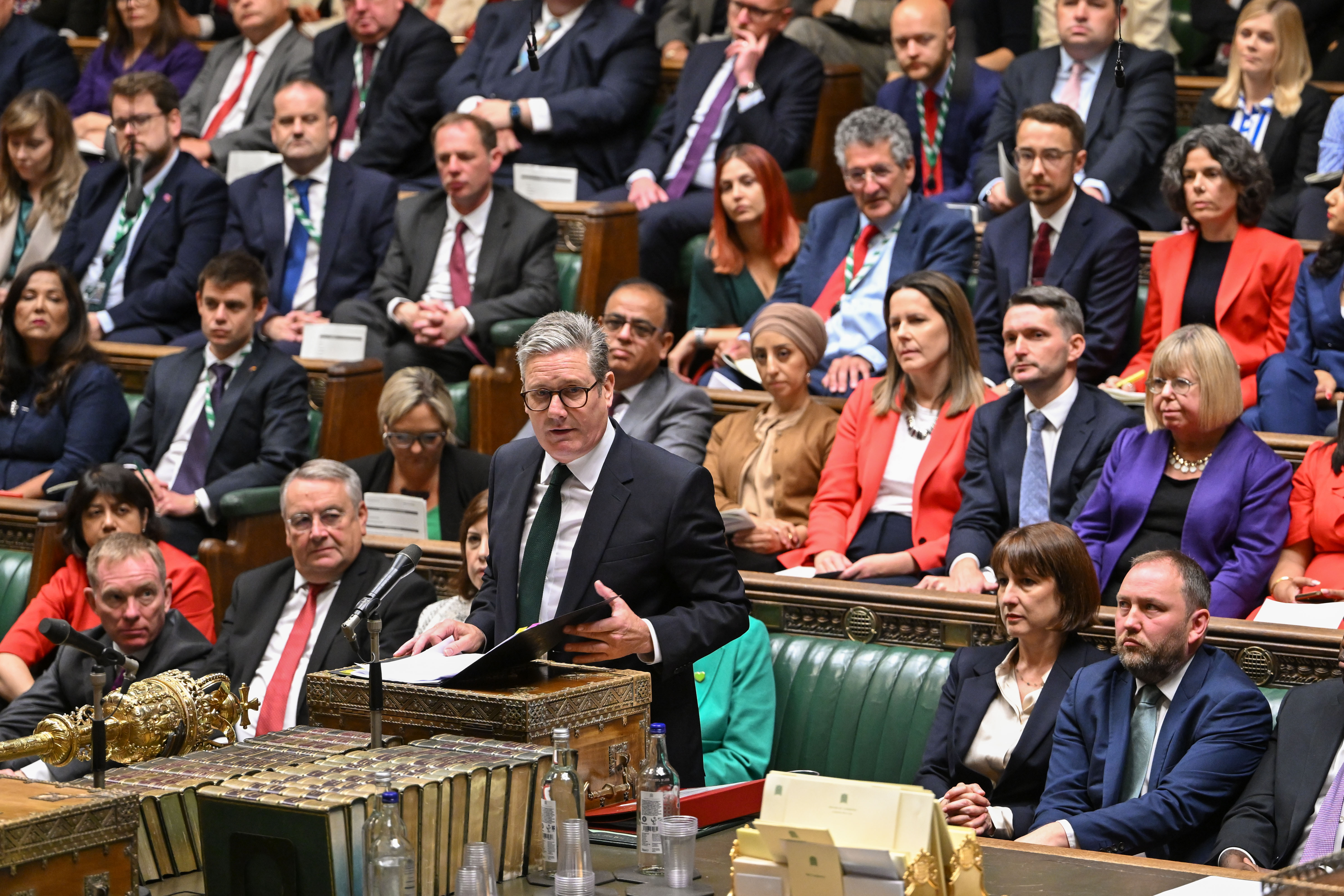
Prime minister Keir Starmer, speaking in the House of Commons on 4 September 2024

Before the 1880s, oral questions were mainly directed towards cabinet ministers and therefore such questions were regarded as the same even when addressed to the prime minister. The session in its modern form was first introduced on Tuesday 24 October in 1961 when the then prime minister Harold Macmillan answered questions for between 15 minutes from 3.15 pm to 3.30 pm as an experiment. Since 1997 PMQs were held every Wednesdays at 3 pm until 3.30 pm. In 1989, the first PMQs were broadcast and in 1990 were broadcast live to the public as a step towards transparency and accountability.

The timing of PMQs has often changed depending on the varied schedules of prime ministers. In 1881, questions addressed to the prime minister were placed at the end of question time so that the then 72-year-old Prime Minister William Gladstone could arrive late. In 1904, questions were answered only when they reached No 51 and in 1940 they were expanded to No 45. The procedure was in practice until 1953 when PMQs were restricted to Tuesdays and Thursdays only to assist Winston Churchill who was 78-years old.

The prime minister also appears before the Liaison Committee to answer questions about public policy.

=== Security and transport ===
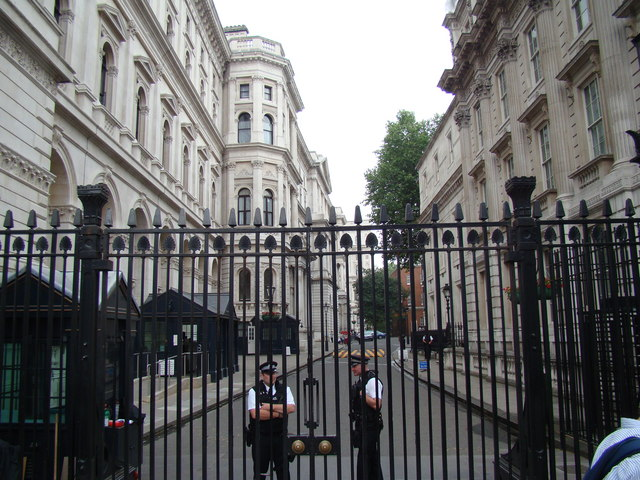
Two armed police officers stand guard in 2009 at the entrance to Downing Street, where the official residence of the prime minister is located.

The personal protection of the prime minister and former prime ministers is the responsibility of Protection Command within the Metropolitan Police Service. When the prime minister resides in 10 Downing Street, they are constantly surrounded by armed police units with "airport-style" security checkpoints, large metal gates, street patrols and heavy vetting for staff and non-ministerial individuals. Such installations were introduced due to fears of IRA bomb threats and attacks which were persistent during The Troubles. When travelling, the prime minister will be accompanied by a select group of police officers joined by a wider team of security personnel. On the road, the prime ministerial entourage will be followed by police outriders on motorbikes to clear a path in the traffic and to stop them from being a sitting target. The fleet of prime ministerial cars provides the prime minister with a number of security features as well as transport. The vehicles are driven by officers from this unit. These vehicles are often custom made and always British manufactured with in-built gun ports, an independent oxygen supply and the ability to release tear gas to subdue crowds. Air transport for the prime minister is provided by a variety of military and civilian operators.

=== International role ===
One of the roles of the prime minister is to represent the UK at home and abroad, for example at the annual G7 Summit. The prime minister makes many international trips. According to Gus O'Donnell, the number of overseas visits for the prime minister has gone up.

=== Deputy ===
Prime ministers have had various deputies, sometimes as an official deputy prime minister, first secretary of state or de facto deputy. Some prime ministers have not chosen a deputy at all, preferring ad hoc arrangements.

Historically, the position of deputy prime minister has been created out of political necessity rather than being established by statutory law or convention with the title not being defined in the constitution. The position was first created (unofficially) for Clement Attlee in prime minister Winston Churchill's ministry during World War II, to manage administrative duties, domestic affairs and welfare, while Churchill focused on military strategy. In recent times, after the 2010 general election resulted in a hung parliament, the leaders of the Conservative and the Liberal Democrats, David Cameron and Nick Clegg, formed a coalition government in which Clegg served as deputy prime minister. In that capacity, Clegg chaired cabinet meetings, key committees and led negotiations on major reforms. As such, the office saw an unusual level of formalisation and recognition during Clegg's tenure.

==== Succession ====
Nobody has the right of automatic succession to the prime ministership. It is generally considered that in the event of the death of the prime minister, it would be appropriate to appoint an interim prime minister, though there is some debate as to how to decide who this should be.

According to Rodney Brazier, there are no procedures within government to cope with the sudden death of the prime minister. There is also no such title as acting prime minister of the United Kingdom. Despite refusing "...to discuss a hypothetical situation" with BBC News in 2011, the Cabinet Office said the following in 2006:

There is no single protocol setting out all of the possible implications. However, the general constitutional position is as set out below. There can be no automatic assumption about who The Queen would ask to act as caretaker Prime Minister in the event of the death of the Prime Minister. The decision is for her under the Royal Prerogative. However, there are some key guiding principles. The Queen would probably be looking for a very senior member of the Government (not necessarily a Commons Minister since this would be a short-term appointment). If there was a recognised deputy to the Prime Minister, used to acting on his behalf in his absences, this could be an important factor. Also important would be the question of who was likely to be in contention to take over long-term as Prime Minister. If the most senior member of the Government was him or herself a contender for the role of Prime Minister, it might be that The Queen would invite a slightly less senior non-contender. In these circumstances, her private secretary would probably take soundings, via the Cabinet Secretary, of members of the Cabinet, to ensure that The Queen invited someone who would be acceptable to the Cabinet to act as their chair during the caretaker period. Once the Party had elected a new leader, that person would, of course, be invited to take over as Prime Minister.

Additionally, when the prime minister is travelling, it is standard practice for a senior duty minister to be appointed who can attend to urgent business and meetings if required, though the prime minister remains in charge and updated throughout.

On 6 April 2020, when Boris Johnson was admitted into the Intensive Care Unit of St Thomas' Hospital, when suffering from COVID-19, he asked Dominic Raab "to deputise for him where necessary".

=== Resignation ===
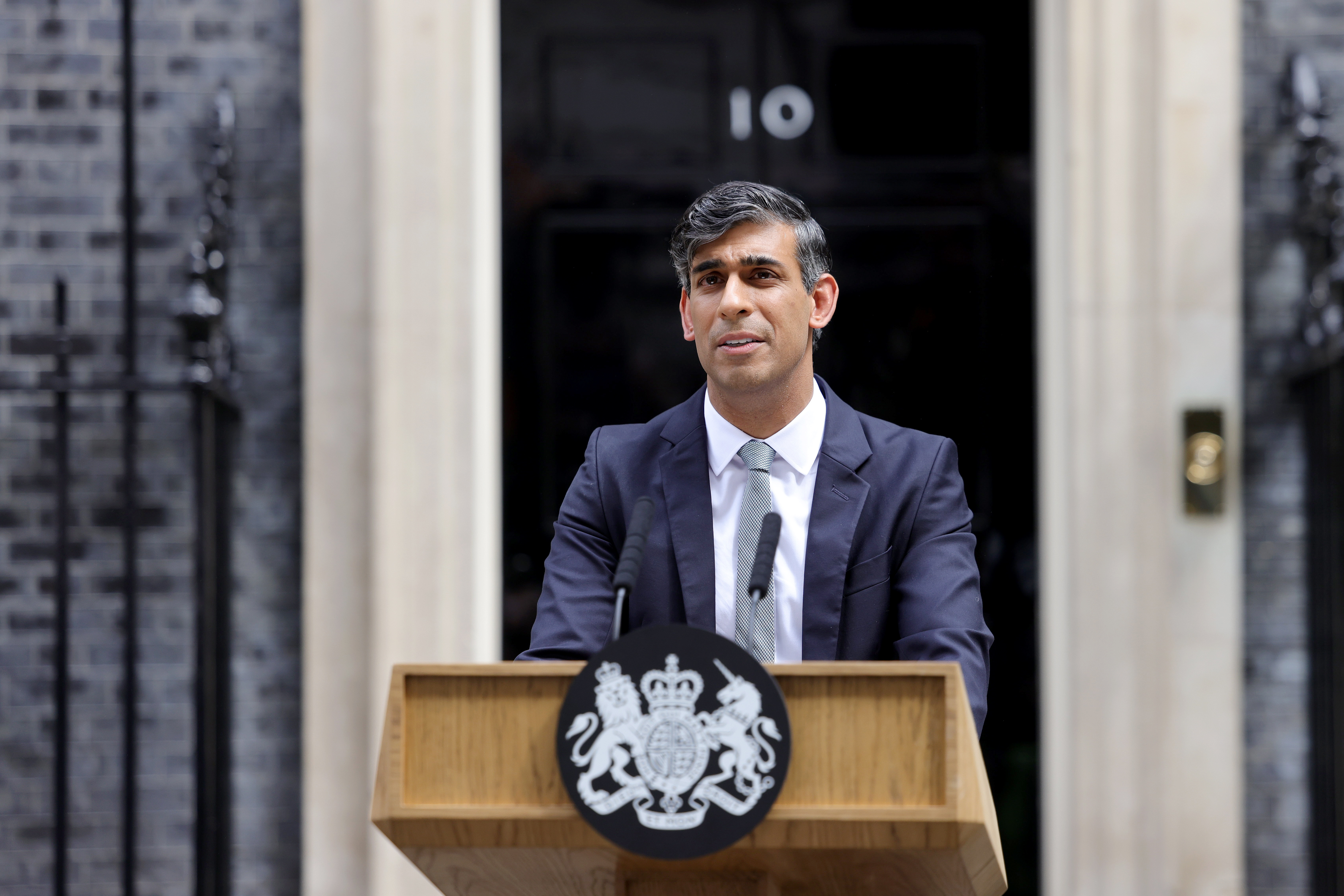
Prime minister Rishi Sunak announces his resignation outside 10 Downing Street, 5 July 2024.

A prime minister ends their tenure by offering their resignation to the British monarch. This can happen after their party has suffered a general election defeat, so that they no longer command the confidence of the House of Commons. It can also happen mid-term, if they are forced to resign for political reasons, or for other reasons such as ill-health. If the prime minister resigns mid-term, and their party has a majority in the Commons, the party selects a new leader according to its rules, and this new leader is invited by the monarch to become the new prime minister. The outgoing prime minister is likely to remain in office until the party has chosen a new leader. After resigning, the outgoing prime minister remains a member of Parliament. An outgoing prime minister can ask the monarch to bestow honours on any number of people of their choosing, known as the Prime Minister's Resignation Honours. No incumbent prime minister has ever lost their own seat at a general election. Only one prime minister has been assassinated: Spencer Perceval, in 1812.

== Privileges ==
On taking office a new prime minister usually makes a public statement to announce to the country that they have been appointed by the reigning monarch (called "kissing hands"). This is usually done by saying words to the effect of:

His Majesty the King [Her Majesty the Queen] has asked me to form a government and I have accepted.

=== Precedence and form of address ===
Ministerial listings are printed in the official records of parliament known as "Hansard", and 1885 was the first known instance of official use of the title of prime minister. The minutes of the first meeting of the Committee of Imperial Defence in 1902 saw the first internal reference to the title as well. The 1904 edition of the Imperial Calendar referred to the then prime minister, Arthur Balfour, as 'Prime Minister and First Lord of the Treasury'; in the previous edition he was merely 'First Lord of the Treasury and Lord Privy Seal'.

Throughout the United Kingdom, the prime minister outranks all other dignitaries except members of the royal family, the lord chancellor, and senior ecclesiastical figures. (Note: These include: in England and Wales, the Anglican archbishops of Canterbury and York; in Scotland, the lord high commissioner and the moderator of the General Assembly of the Church of Scotland; in Northern Ireland, the Anglican and Roman Catholic archbishops of Armagh and Dublin and the moderator of the General Assembly of the Presbyterian Church.) The prime minister was officially granted a place in the order of precedence in December 1905, and the first statutory reference to the prime minister was present in the Chequers Estate Act 1917, which specified Chequers as a prime-ministerial residence. Public recognition of the existence of a 'Prime Minister's Office' in the Civil Service Yearbook came as recently as the 1977 edition.

The prime minister is customarily a member of the Privy Council and thus entitled to the appellation "The Right Honourable". Membership of the Council is retained for life. It is a constitutional convention that only a privy counsellor can be appointed prime minister. Most potential candidates have already attained this status. The only case when a non-privy counsellor was the natural appointment was Ramsay MacDonald in 1924. The issue was resolved by appointing him to the Council immediately prior to his appointment as prime minister.

According to the now-defunct Department for Constitutional Affairs, the prime minister is made a privy counsellor as a result of taking office and should be addressed by the official title prefixed by "The Right Honourable" and not by a personal name. Although this form of address is employed on formal occasions, it is rarely used by the media. As "prime minister" is a position, not a title, the incumbent should be referred to as "the prime minister", although the title "Prime Minister" (e.g. "Prime Minister Andy Burnham") has become commonplace within current political reporting. Within the UK, the expression "Prime Minister Burnham" is never used, although it, too, is sometimes used by foreign dignitaries and news sources.

=== Compensation ===
In 2010, the prime minister received £14,500 in addition to a salary of £65,737 as a member of parliament. Until 2006, the lord chancellor was the highest-paid member of the government, ahead of the prime minister. This reflected the lord chancellor's position at the head of the judicial pay scale. The Constitutional Reform Act 2005 eliminated the lord chancellor's judicial functions and also reduced the office's salary to below that of the prime minister. During the premiership of Gordon Brown, the prime minister received a salary of £193,885 on 1 April 2009 which was higher than the salary of £166,786 as of 2024. The reasons for such reductions are Brown's cuts to voluntary pay at around £150,000 during pre-election in the May 2010 election, and when David Cameron became prime minister the cuts were extended to 5%, amounting at around £142,500. Subsequent prime ministers have kept the restraint on ministerial pay and have not taken any further pay outside of what they are entitled. According to journalist Simon Kelner, the salary of the prime minister must be increased and that further expansion of a salary or hospitality received by a prime minister is disavowed under the Corrupt and Illegal Practices Prevention Act 1883 which only criminalised voter bribery and introduced standards for election expenses, and "created a more level playing field for parliamentary candidates". Kelner said that it is an inadequate way of holding a prime minister into account. This was in response to the 2024 Labour Party freebies controversy, in which the prime minister at the time, Keir Starmer, reportedly failed to disclose the amount of gifts and "freebies" received by him, members of his family and cabinet.

=== Official residences ===
Prime ministerial residences

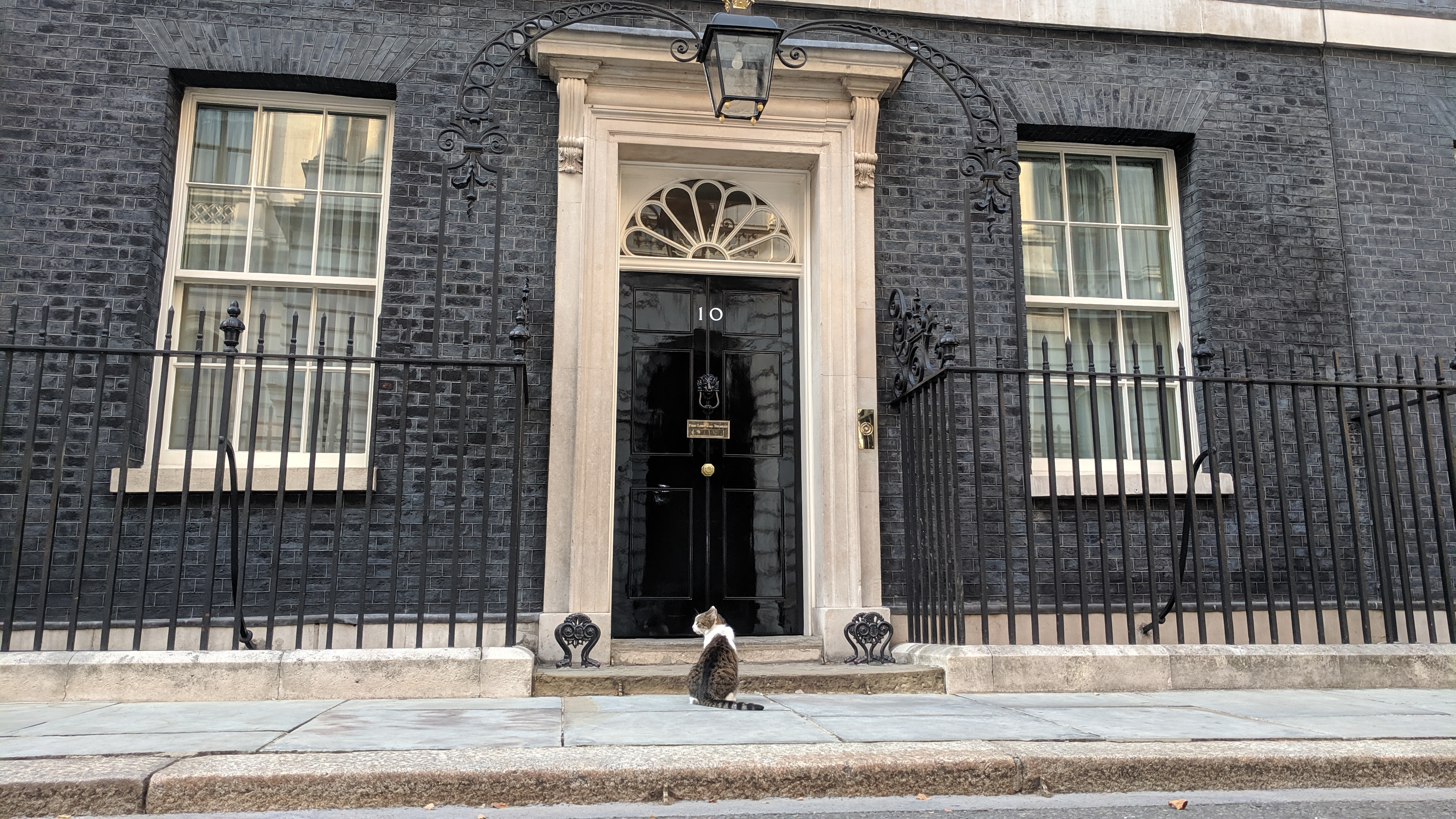
10 Downing Street, the official place of residence of the prime minister

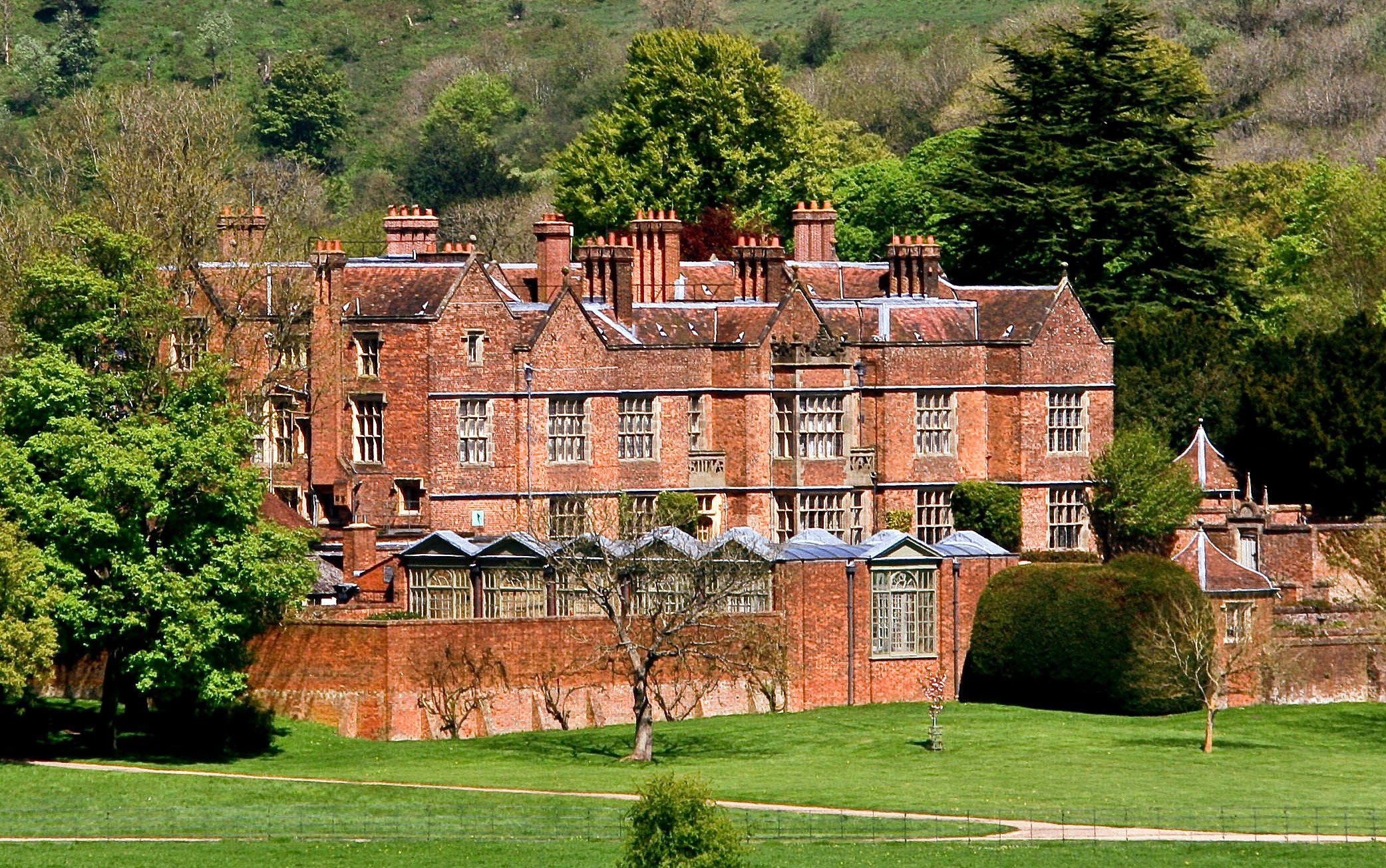
Chequers, used by the prime minister as a country retreat

10 Downing Street, in London, has been the official place of residence of the prime minister since 1732; they are entitled to use its staff and facilities, including extensive offices. The building was originally given by King George I to Robert Walpole, the nation's first prime minister, as a personal gift. However, Walpole insisted that he would accept it in his capacity as first lord of the Treasury and requested that his subsequent successors be entitled to reside in and use the property as they wish. The complex incorporates the flats of No.11 and No.12 Downing Street, which have been reconstructed through to connect them to No.10. Altogether, the three buildings contain over 100 rooms.

Chequers, a country house in Buckinghamshire, gifted to the government in 1917, may be used as a country retreat for the prime minister. The estate was previously owned by the Conservative minister and First Lord of the Admiralty, Arthur Lee, before being donated to the British government under the Chequers Estate Act 1917. It was to give the incumbent prime minister the time to "spend two days a week in the high and pure air of the Chiltern hills and woods" and on the condition that incumbent should not own any residential country estate of their own.

During the 18th and 19th centuries, many prime ministers were members of the British nobility and therefore held the office while serving in the House of Lords. Through lineage and inheritance, these prime ministers acquired large estates, though they still owned properties in London for political affairs and many used country houses as a retreat. Until the mid-20th century, parliamentary sessions did not begin until the New Year after ending in August, which would give the prime minister long periods in respite.

== Post-premiership ==
=== Retirement honours ===
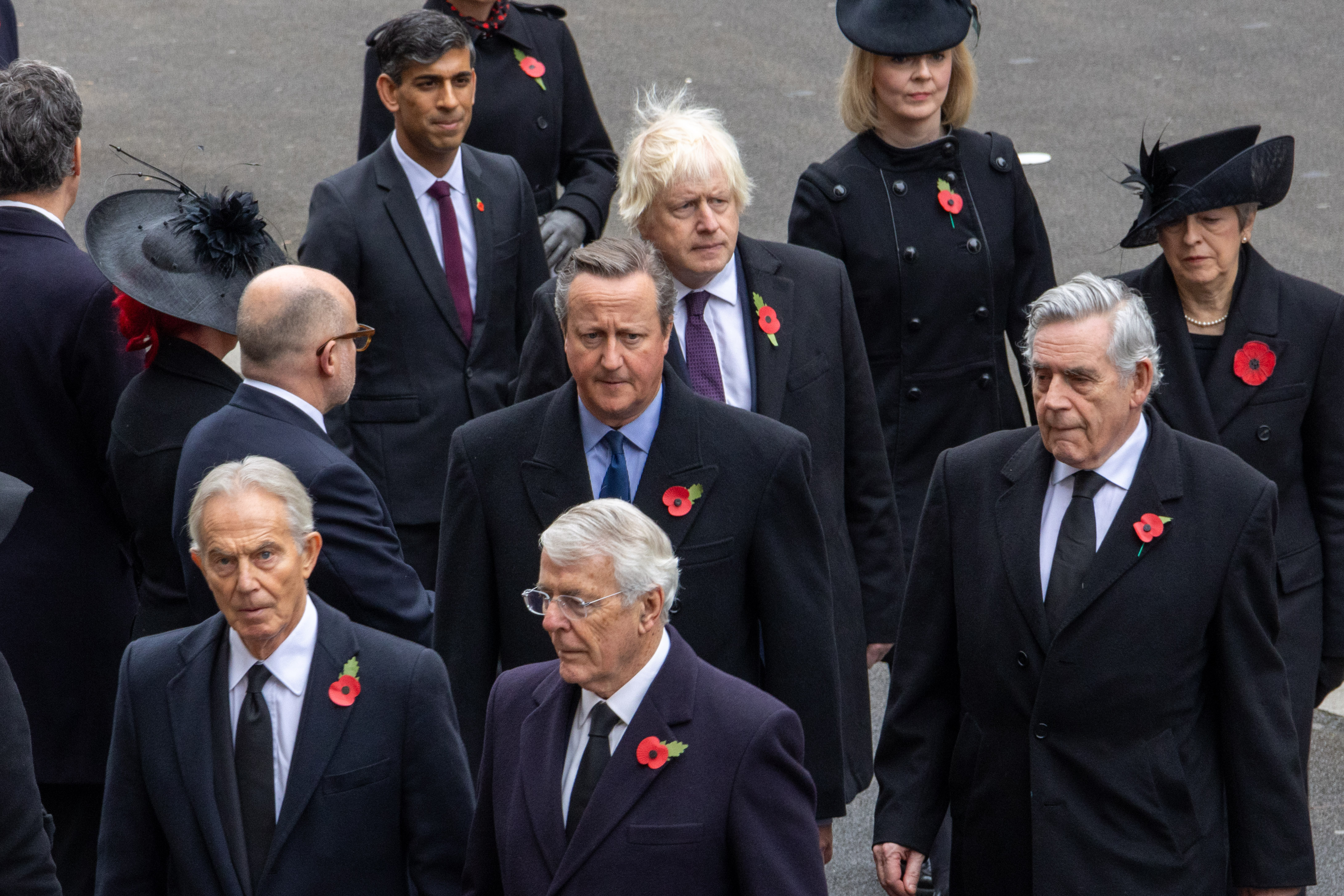
Eight former prime ministers seen together in 2024 – first row Blair and Major, second row Cameron and Brown, third Johnson and May, fourth Sunak and Truss

Upon retirement, it is customary for the sovereign to grant a prime minister some honour or dignity. The honour bestowed is commonly, but not invariably, membership of the UK's most senior order of chivalry, the Order of the Garter. The practice of creating a retired prime minister a Knight Companion of the Garter (KG) has been fairly prevalent since the mid-nineteenth century. Upon the retirement of a prime minister who is Scottish, it is likely that the primarily Scottish honour of Knight of the Thistle (KT) will be used instead of the Order of the Garter, which is generally regarded as an English honour. (Note: This circumstance is somewhat confused, however, as since the Great Reform Act 1832, only seven Scots have served as prime minister. Of these, two – Bonar Law and Ramsay MacDonald – died while still sitting in the Commons, not yet having retired; MacDonald was offered the KT in 1935, but declined it as acceptance would have conflicted with his principles as a Labour Party member. The Earl of Aberdeen was appointed to both the Order of the Garter and the Order of the Thistle, while Alec Douglas-Home became a KT while Foreign Secretary. Yet another, Arthur Balfour, was appointed to the Order of the Garter, but represented an English constituency and may not have considered himself entirely Scottish; of the remaining two, the Earl of Rosebery became a KG, and Gordon Brown remained in the House of Commons as a backbencher until 2015.)

Historically it has also been common to grant prime ministers a peerage upon retirement from the Commons, elevating the individual to the Lords. Formerly, the peerage bestowed was usually an earldom. (Note: Churchill was offered a dukedom but declined.) The last such creation was for Harold Macmillan, who resigned in 1963. Unusually, he became Earl of Stockton only in 1984, over twenty years after leaving office.

Macmillan's successors Alec Douglas-Home, Harold Wilson, James Callaghan, Margaret Thatcher, David Cameron, and Theresa May all accepted life peerages (although Douglas-Home had previously disclaimed his hereditary title as Earl of Home and Cameron received a peerage after reentering government as Foreign Secretary, not for services as a former prime minister). Edward Heath did not accept a peerage of any kind; neither have any of the prime ministers who have retired since 1990 other than Cameron (having done so to re-join the Cabinet, rather than as an honour per se) and May. Edward Heath (in 1992), John Major (in 2005) and Tony Blair (in 2022) were appointed as Knights Companion of the Garter. Major (in 1998) and Gordon Brown (in 2024) were appointed members of the Order of the Companions of Honour, although Blair had previously disclosed that he did not want honours bestowed on himself or future prime ministers.

The most recent former prime minister to die was Margaret Thatcher (1979–1990) on 8 April 2013. Her death meant that for the first time since 1955 (the year in which the Earldom of Attlee was created, subsequent to the death of Earl Baldwin in 1947) the membership of the House of Lords included no former prime minister, a situation which remained the case until David Cameron was appointed to the House in November 2023.

=== Activities ===
There are currently no established roles or job positions for former prime ministers following their resignations or after leaving office unexpectedly. It depends on their personal choice and reasons surrounding the need to take on such positions. During the 18th and 19th centuries, many former prime ministers, who were wealthy members of the nobility, would often simply retire to their country estates. The first prime minister, Robert Walpole, accumulated large personal wealth while serving in office and from previous investments made in the 1710s. Prime ministers Lord Bute and Lord Rosebery were among the wealthiest men in the country during their retirements and are often touted as some of the wealthiest to serve as in office. However some prime ministers, such as William Pitt the Elder and his son William Pitt the Younger, amassed large public debts that were later paid off by parliament. In 1937, an official pension for former prime ministers was given at the sum of £2000 per annum.

In their retirements, a majority of former prime ministers have written memoirs and autobiographies. Some prime ministers have also written non-political books as well, including Winston Churchill's histories of World War II and of the English language, Edward Heath's books on his wider interests in sailing, music and travel, Major's history of cricket and Arthur Balfour's philosophical writings. Some prime ministers such as William Gladstone mainly wrote tracts and tomes on theology and religion and Benjamin Disraeli wrote many best-selling novels in addition to memoirs and history.

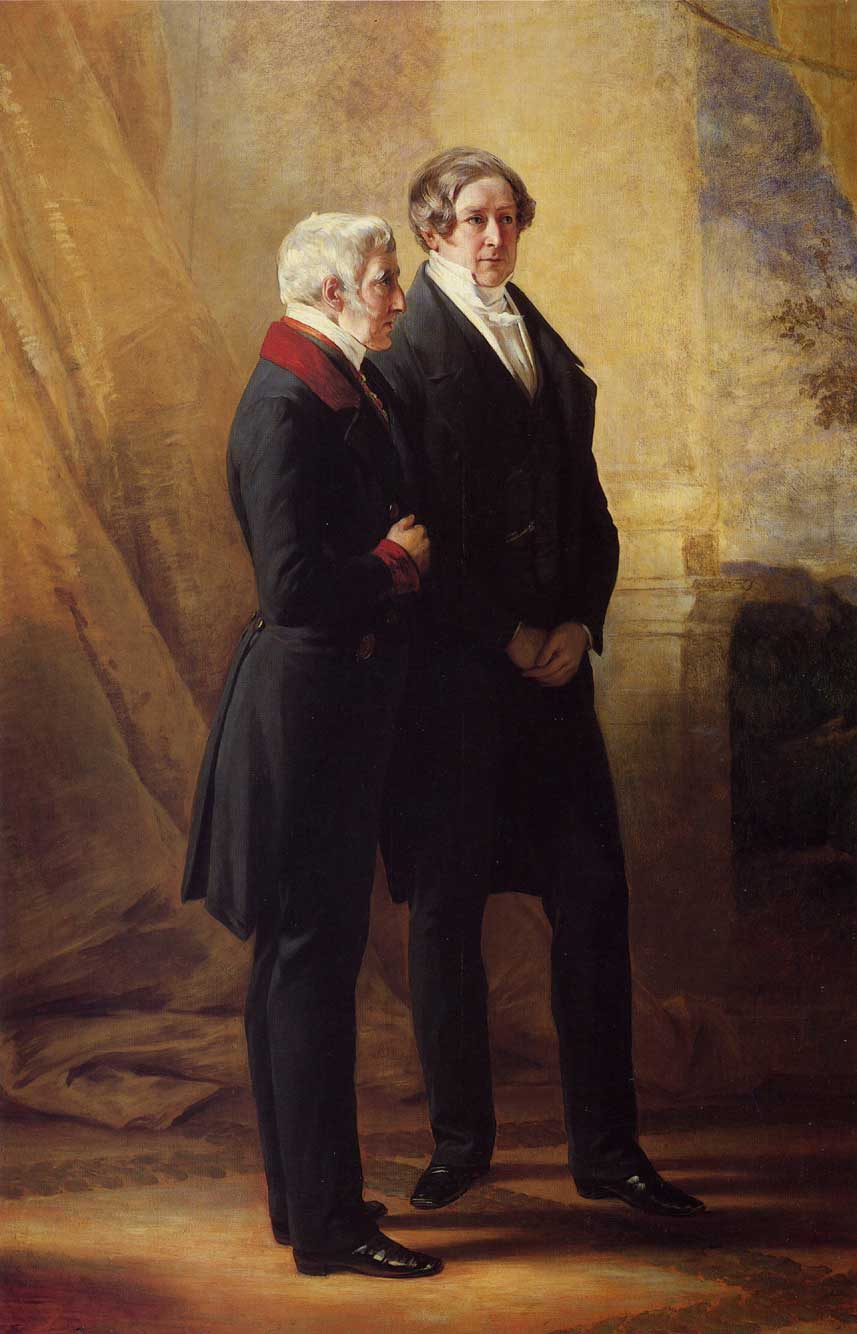
The Duke of Wellington (on the left) served in the government of his successor, Robert Peel (on the right), twice.

In the 21st century, many former prime ministers have set up their own foundations and charities to be used as a platform to continue involvement in political and public issues after they leave office. In 1991, Margaret Thatcher became the first prime minister to set up her own foundation to try to secure her legacy and propagate her ideology known as Thatcherism, but it closed down in 2005. Tony Blair has set up a sports foundation, an inter-faith foundation and the Tony Blair Institute for Global Change in 2016. In his post-premiership, Blair is also the first prime minister to take on a major international role, as an official envoy of the Quartet on the Middle East. Gordon Brown was actively involved in politics long after he left office, most notably during the 2014 Scottish independence referendum, in which he campaigned for the no vote that advocated Scotland to remain in the union.

However, some former prime ministers have returned to serve in the governments of their successors, and a few have had 'retreads' that saw them serve short tenures due to their successors unexpectedly resigning or dying. Notable cases include the Duke of Wellington who, after serving two brief terms in office, was able to command significant influence as a senior member of the Tory party and returned to serve in two governments of his successor, Robert Peel, as Foreign Secretary and Minister without portfolio. He later retired to serve as Commander-in-Chief of the Army from 1842 until his death in 1852. Arthur Balfour served as prime minister for three years of his term after he was defeated in the 1906 general election and later went on to serve as the Foreign Secretary for eleven years in the Imperial War Cabinet during and after World War I under three prime ministers. After Neville Chamberlain resigned as prime minister in May 1940, he returned to serve under Winston Churchill in his subsequent war cabinet. Alec Douglas-Home, who resigned after losing the 1964 general election, later came to serve in the cabinet of Edward Heath in 1970. David Cameron returned 7 years after resigning as Prime Minister to serve as Foreign Secretary under Rishi Sunak.

=== Public Duty Costs Allowance (PDCA) ===
All former prime ministers are entitled to claim for salary or office expenses incurred in fulfilling public duties in that role. The allowance may not be used to pay for private or parliamentary duties. It is administered by the Cabinet Office Finance Team.

The maximum amount which may be claimed per year is £115,000, plus 10% towards any staff pension costs. This limit is reviewed annually, and at the start of each Parliament, by the current prime minister. The maximum level may be adjusted downward if the former prime minister receives any public funds for fulfilling other public appointments. Downing Street confirmed in November 2023 that former prime minister David Cameron would not claim from the PDCA while he acted as Foreign Secretary.

== See also ==
=== Lists of prime ministers by different criteria ===
- Historical rankings of prime ministers of the United Kingdom
- List of current heads of government in the United Kingdom and dependencies
- List of fictional prime ministers of the United Kingdom
- List of peerages held by prime ministers of the United Kingdom
- List of prime ministers of the United Kingdom
- List of prime ministers of the United Kingdom by age
- List of prime ministers of the United Kingdom by education
- List of prime ministers of the United Kingdom by length of tenure
- List of United Kingdom Parliament constituencies represented by sitting prime ministers
- Timeline of prime ministers of Great Britain and the United Kingdom

All lists: Category:Lists of prime ministers of the United Kingdom

=== Other related pages ===
- Air transport of the British royal family and government
- Armorial of prime ministers of the United Kingdom
- Category:Books written by prime ministers of the United Kingdom
- Cultural depictions of prime ministers of the United Kingdom
- Deputy Prime Minister of the United Kingdom – Senior member of the British government
- List of burial places of prime ministers of the United Kingdom
- List of nicknames of prime ministers of the United Kingdom
- List of things named after prime ministers of the United Kingdom
- Records of prime ministers of the United Kingdom
- Spouse of the prime minister of the United Kingdom

More related pages: Category:Prime ministers of the United Kingdom
