= Timeline of chief ministers and prime ministers of England, Great Britain and the United Kingdom =

This is a graphical timeline of chief ministers and prime ministers of England, Great Britain and the United Kingdom from when the first chief minister of England, Dunstan took up the position, and then from when the position of prime minister of Great Britain was formalised through to the present day.

From 1801 until 1922, British prime ministers also held the office for the whole of Ireland.

== See also ==
- List of English chief ministers
- Timeline of prime ministers of Great Britain and the United Kingdom
