= List of prime ministers of the United Kingdom by age =

This is a list of prime ministers of the United Kingdom by age. This table can be sorted to display prime ministers of the United Kingdom by name, order of office, date of birth, age at appointment, length of retirement, or lifespan. Age at appointment is determined by the day a prime minister assumed office for the first time. Length of retirement is determined from the day a prime minister leaves office for the final time until their death.

Where the prime minister in question is still living, their longevity is measured up to 8 November 2026.

== List of prime ministers ==
Living as of November 2026
Prime Minister	Date of birth	Premiership
John Major	29 March 1943 (age 83)	1990–1997
Gordon Brown	20 February 1951 (age 75)	2007–2010
Tony Blair	6 May 1953 (age 73)	1997–2007
Theresa May	1 October 1956 (age 70)	2016–2019
Keir Starmer	2 September 1962 (age 64)	2024–2026
Boris Johnson	19 June 1964 (age 62)	2019–2022
David Cameron	9 October 1966 (age 60)	2010–2016
Andy Burnham	7 January 1970 (age 56)	2026–present
Liz Truss	26 July 1975 (age 51)	2022
Rishi Sunak	12 May 1980 (age 46)	2022–2024

Key to table

Living
Currently in office
Prime Ministers who served two or more non-consecutive terms

No.	Name	Born	Date of first appointment (Note: Great Britain did not adopt the Gregorian calendar until 1752, "losing" 11 days)	Age	Final end of service	Age	Post–premiership/ Time period between two non-consecutive tenures (in italics)	Death	Lifespan
1	Robert Walpole	26 August 1676	3 April 1721	44 years, 220 days	11 February 1742	65 years, 169 days	3 years, 35 days	18 March 1745	68 years, 204 days
2	Spencer Compton, 1st Earl of Wilmington	1 January 1673	16 February 1742	68–69 years	2 July 1743	69–70 years	0 days	2 July 1743 (Note: Died in office)	69–70 years
3	Henry Pelham	25 September 1694	27 August 1743	48 years, 336 days	6 March 1754	59 years, 162 days	0 days	6 March 1754	59 years, 162 days
4	Thomas Pelham-Holles, 1st Duke of Newcastle	21 July 1693	16 March 1754	60 years, 238 days	26 May 1762	68 years, 309 days	6 years, 175 days	17 November 1768	75 years, 119 days
5	William Cavendish, 4th Duke of Devonshire	8 May 1720	16 November 1756	36 years, 192 days	29 June 1757	37 years, 52 days	7 years, 95 days	2 October 1764	44 years, 147 days
6	John Stuart, 3rd Earl of Bute	25 May 1713	26 May 1762	49 years, 1 day	8 April 1763	49 years, 318 days	28 years, 337 days	10 March 1792	78 years, 290 days
7	George Grenville	14 October 1712	16 April 1763	50 years, 184 days	10 July 1765	52 years, 269 days	5 years, 126 days	13 November 1770	58 years, 30 days
8	Charles Watson-Wentworth, 2nd Marquess of Rockingham	13 May 1730	13 July 1765	35 years, 61 days	1 July 1782	52 years, 49 days	0 days	1 July 1782	52 years, 49 days
9	William Pitt the Elder	15 November 1708	30 July 1766	57 years, 257 days	14 October 1768	59 years, 334 days	9 years, 209 days	11 May 1778	69 years, 177 days
10	Augustus FitzRoy, 3rd Duke of Grafton	28 September 1735	14 October 1768	33 years, 16 days	28 January 1770	34 years, 122 days	41 years, 45 days	14 March 1811	75 years, 167 days
11	Frederick North, Lord North	13 April 1732	28 January 1770	37 years, 290 days	27 March 1782	49 years, 348 days	10 years, 131 days	5 August 1792	60 years, 114 days
12	William Petty, 2nd Earl of Shelburne	2 May 1737	4 July 1782	45 years, 63 days	26 March 1783	45 years, 328 days	22 years, 42 days	7 May 1805	68 years, 5 days
13	William Cavendish-Bentinck, 3rd Duke of Portland	14 April 1738	2 April 1783	44 years, 353 days	4 October 1809	71 years, 173 days	26 days	30 October 1809	71 years, 199 days
14	William Pitt the Younger	28 May 1759	19 December 1783	24 years, 205 days	23 January 1806	46 years, 240 days	0 days	23 January 1806	46 years, 240 days
15	Henry Addington	30 May 1757	17 March 1801	43 years, 291 days	10 May 1804	46 years, 346 days	39 years, 281 days	15 February 1844	86 years, 261 days
16	William Grenville	25 October 1759	11 February 1806	46 years, 109 days	25 March 1807	47 years, 151 days	26 years, 293 days	12 January 1834	74 years, 79 days
17	Spencer Perceval	1 November 1762	4 October 1809	46 years, 337 days	11 May 1812	49 years, 192 days	0 days	11 May 1812	49 years, 192 days
18	Robert Jenkinson, 2nd Earl of Liverpool	7 June 1770	8 June 1812	42 years, 1 day	9 April 1827	56 years, 306 days	1 year, 239 days	4 December 1828	58 years, 180 days
19	George Canning	11 April 1770	12 April 1827	57 years, 1 day	8 August 1827	57 years, 119 days	0 days	8 August 1827	57 years, 119 days
20	F. J. Robinson, 1st Viscount Goderich	1 November 1782	31 August 1827	44 years, 303 days	8 January 1828	45 years, 68 days	31 years, 20 days	28 January 1859	76 years, 88 days
21	Arthur Wellesley, 1st Duke of Wellington	1 May 1769	22 January 1828	58 years, 266 days	9 December 1834	65 years, 222 days	17 years, 280 days	14 September 1852	83 years, 136 days
22	Charles Grey, 2nd Earl Grey	13 March 1764	22 November 1830	66 years, 254 days	9 July 1834	70 years, 118 days	11 years, 8 days	17 July 1845	81 years, 126 days
23	William Lamb, 2nd Viscount Melbourne	15 March 1779	16 July 1834	55 years, 123 days	30 August 1841	62 years, 168 days	7 years, 86 days	24 November 1848	69 years, 254 days
24	Robert Peel	5 February 1788	10 December 1834	46 years, 308 days	29 June 1846	58 years, 144 days	4 years, 3 days	2 July 1850	62 years, 147 days
25	Lord John Russell	18 August 1792	30 June 1846	53 years, 316 days	26 June 1866	73 years, 312 days	11 years, 336 days	28 May 1878	85 years, 283 days
26	Edward Smith-Stanley, 14th Earl of Derby	29 March 1799	23 February 1852	52 years, 331 days	25 February 1868	68 years, 333 days	1 year, 240 days	23 October 1869	70 years, 208 days
27	George Hamilton-Gordon, 4th Earl of Aberdeen	28 January 1784	19 December 1852	68 years, 326 days	30 January 1855	71 years, 2 days	5 years, 319 days	14 December 1860	76 years, 321 days
28	Henry John Temple, 3rd Viscount Palmerston	20 October 1784	6 February 1855	70 years, 109 days	18 October 1865	80 years, 363 days	0 days	18 October 1865	80 years, 363 days
29	Benjamin Disraeli (Term 1)	21 December 1804	27 February 1868	63 years, 68 days	1 December 1868	63 years, 346 days	5 years, 83 days	19 April 1881	76 years, 119 days
30	William Ewart Gladstone (Term 1)	29 December 1809	3 December 1868	58 years, 340 days	17 February 1874	64 years, 51 days	6 years, 67 days	19 May 1898	88 years, 141 days
(29)	Benjamin Disraeli (Term 2)	21 December 1804	20 February 1874	69 years, 71 days	21 April 1880	75 years, 122 days	363 days	19 April 1881	76 years, 119 days
(30)	William Ewart Gladstone (Term 2)	29 December 1809	23 April 1880	70 years, 116 days	9 June 1885	75 years, 163 days	238 days	19 May 1898	88 years, 141 days
31	Robert Gascoyne-Cecil, 3rd Marquess of Salisbury (Term 1)	3 February 1830	23 June 1885	55 years, 140 days	28 January 1886	55 years, 359 days	179 days	22 August 1903	73 years, 200 days
(30)	William Ewart Gladstone (Term 3)	29 December 1809	1 February 1886	76 years, 35 days	21 July 1886	76 years, 205 days	6 years, 21 days	19 May 1898	88 years, 141 days
(31)	Robert Gascoyne-Cecil, 3rd Marquess of Salisbury (Term 2)	3 February 1830	25 July 1886	56 years, 172 days	11 August 1892	62 years, 189 days	2 years, 313 days	22 August 1903	73 years, 200 days
(30)	William Ewart Gladstone (Term 4)	29 December 1809	11 August 1892	82 years, 226 days	2 March 1894	84 years, 63 days	4 years, 78 days	19 May 1898	88 years, 141 days
32	Archibald Primrose, 5th Earl of Rosebery	7 May 1847	5 March 1894	46 years, 302 days	22 June 1895	48 years, 46 days	33 years, 333 days	21 May 1929	82 years, 14 days
(31)	Robert Gascoyne-Cecil, 3rd Marquess of Salisbury (Term 3)	3 February 1830	25 June 1895	65 years, 142 days	11 July 1902	72 years, 158 days	1 year, 42 days	22 August 1903	73 years, 200 days
33	Arthur Balfour	25 July 1848	12 July 1902	53 years, 352 days	4 December 1905	57 years, 132 days	24 years, 105 days	19 March 1930	81 years, 237 days
34	Henry Campbell-Bannerman	7 September 1836	5 December 1905	69 years, 89 days	3 April 1908	71 years, 211 days	19 days	22 April 1908	71 years, 228 days
35	H. H. Asquith	12 September 1852	5 April 1908	55 years, 206 days	5 December 1916	64 years, 84 days	11 years, 72 days	15 February 1928	75 years, 156 days
36	David Lloyd George	17 January 1863	6 December 1916	53 years, 324 days	22 October 1922	59 years, 278 days	22 years, 155 days	26 March 1945	82 years, 68 days
37	Bonar Law	16 September 1858	23 October 1922	64 years, 37 days	20 May 1923	64 years, 246 days	163 days	30 October 1923	65 years, 44 days
38	Stanley Baldwin (Term 1)	3 August 1867	22 May 1923	55 years, 292 days	22 January 1924	56 years, 173 days	288 days	14 December 1947	80 years, 133 days
39	Ramsay MacDonald (Term 1)	12 October 1866	22 January 1924	57 years, 102 days	4 November 1924	58 years, 23 days	4 years, 213 days	9 November 1937	71 years, 28 days
(38)	Stanley Baldwin (Term 2)	3 August 1867	4 November 1924	57 years, 93 days	5 June 1929	61 years, 306 days	6 years, 2 days	14 December 1947	80 years, 133 days
(39)	Ramsay MacDonald (Term 2)	12 October 1866	5 June 1929	62 years, 236 days	7 June 1935	68 years, 238 days	2 years, 155 days	9 November 1937	71 years, 28 days
(38)	Stanley Baldwin (Term 3)	3 August 1867	7 June 1935	67 years, 308 days	28 May 1937	69 years, 298 days	10 years, 200 days	14 December 1947	80 years, 133 days
40	Neville Chamberlain	18 March 1869	28 May 1937	68 years, 71 days	10 May 1940	71 years, 53 days	183 days	9 November 1940	71 years, 236 days
41	Winston Churchill (Term 1)	30 November 1874	10 May 1940	65 years, 162 days	26 July 1945	70 years, 238 days	6 years, 93 days	24 January 1965	90 years, 55 days
42	Clement Attlee	3 January 1883	26 July 1945	62 years, 204 days	26 October 1951	68 years, 296 days	15 years, 347 days	8 October 1967	84 years, 278 days
(41)	Winston Churchill (Term 2)	30 November 1874	26 October 1951	76 years, 330 days	6 April 1955	80 years, 126 days	9 years, 294 days	24 January 1965	90 years, 55 days
43	Anthony Eden	12 June 1897	6 April 1955	57 years, 298 days	9 January 1957	59 years, 211 days	20 years, 5 days	14 January 1977	79 years, 216 days
44	Harold Macmillan	10 February 1894	10 January 1957	62 years, 335 days	18 October 1963	69 years, 250 days	23 years, 72 days	29 December 1986	92 years, 322 days
45	Alec Douglas-Home	2 July 1903	19 October 1963	60 years, 109 days	16 October 1964	61 years, 106 days	30 years, 358 days	9 October 1995	92 years, 99 days
46	Harold Wilson (Term 1)	11 March 1916	16 October 1964	48 years, 219 days	19 June 1970	54 years, 100 days	3 years, 259 days	24 May 1995	79 years, 74 days
47	Edward Heath	9 July 1916	19 June 1970	53 years, 345 days	4 March 1974	57 years, 238 days	31 years, 135 days	17 July 2005	89 years, 8 days
(46)	Harold Wilson (Term 2)	11 March 1916	4 March 1974	57 years, 358 days	5 April 1976	60 years, 25 days	19 years, 49 days	24 May 1995	79 years, 74 days
48	James Callaghan	27 March 1912	5 April 1976	64 years, 9 days	4 May 1979	67 years, 38 days	25 years, 326 days	26 March 2005	92 years, 364 days
49	Margaret Thatcher	13 October 1925	4 May 1979	53 years, 203 days	28 November 1990	65 years, 46 days	22 years, 131 days	8 April 2013	87 years, 177 days
50	John Major	29 March 1943	28 November 1990	47 years, 244 days	2 May 1997	54 years, 34 days	29 years, 190 days		83 years, 224 days (30,540 days)
51	Tony Blair	6 May 1953	2 May 1997	43 years, 361 days	27 June 2007	54 years, 52 days	19 years, 134 days		73 years, 186 days (26,849 days)
52	Gordon Brown	20 February 1951	27 June 2007	56 years, 127 days	11 May 2010	59 years, 80 days	16 years, 181 days		75 years, 261 days (27,655 days)
53	David Cameron	9 October 1966	11 May 2010	43 years, 214 days	13 July 2016	49 years, 278 days	10 years, 118 days		60 years, 30 days (21,945 days)
54	Theresa May	1 October 1956	13 July 2016	59 years, 286 days	24 July 2019	62 years, 296 days	7 years, 107 days		70 years, 38 days (25,605 days)
55	Boris Johnson	19 June 1964	24 July 2019	55 years, 35 days	6 September 2022	58 years, 79 days	4 years, 63 days		62 years, 142 days (22,787 days)
56	Liz Truss	26 July 1975	6 September 2022	47 years, 42 days	25 October 2022	47 years, 91 days	4 years, 14 days		51 years, 105 days (18,733 days)
57	Rishi Sunak	12 May 1980	25 October 2022	42 years, 166 days	5 July 2024	44 years, 54 days	2 years, 126 days		46 years, 180 days (16,981 days)
58	Keir Starmer	2 September 1962	5 July 2024	61 years, 307 days	20 July 2026	63 years, 321 days	111 days		64 years, 67 days (23,443 days)
59	Andy Burnham	7 January 1970	20 July 2026	56 years, 194 days	Incumbent				56 years, 305 days (20,759 days)
No.	Name	Born	Date (first appointment)	Age	End of service	Age	Post–premiership/Time period between two non-consecutive tenures (in italics)	Date of death	Lifespan

== Graphical representation ==
This is a graphical lifespan timeline of the prime ministers of the United Kingdom and they are listed in order of office.

The following chart shows prime ministers by their age (living prime ministers in green), with the years of their premiership in blue.

== See also ==
- Timeline of prime ministers of Great Britain and the United Kingdom
- List of presidents of the United States by age
