= Cultural depictions of prime ministers of the United Kingdom =

Cultural depictions of prime ministers of the United Kingdom have become commonplace since the term's first use in 1905. However, they have been applied to prime ministers who were in office before the first use of the term. They are listed here chronologically from the date of first appointment as prime minister.

== William Pitt the Younger ==
- Robert Donat in The Young Mr. Pitt (1942)
- Paul Rogers in Beau Brummell (1954)
- David Collings in Prince Regent (1979)
- Number 10 depicts him as prime minister, played by Jeremy Brett
- Simon Osborne in Blackadder the Third where he is depicted anachronistically as a teenager. A younger brother is also mentioned, who Blackadder refers sarcastically to as "William Pitt the Even Younger", "Pitt the Toddler", "Pitt the Embryo", and "Pitt the Gleam in the Milkman's Eye".
- Benedict Cumberbatch in the 2006 biographical drama Amazing Grace (2006).

== Lord Liverpool ==
- Lord Liverpool was the British prime minister in office when Nathan Mayer Rothschild was active as a banker in London, and was played by Gilbert Emery in the film The House of Rothschild (1934).
- He was also played by Andre van Gyseghem in the TV series Prince Regent (1979).

== George Canning ==
- Canning is depicted in James Gillray's British Tars Towing the Danish Fleet into Harbour (1807)
- John Mills in Lady Caroline Lamb (1972)
- Murray Head in Prince Regent (1979)

== Duke of Wellington ==
- As prime minister he is portrayed by Jeremy Young in the 1993 TV series Scarlet and Black.

== Lord Melbourne ==
Melbourne has been portrayed in the following film and television productions:

- H. B. Warner in Victoria the Great (1937)
- Frederick Leister in The Prime Minister (1941)
- Jon Finch in Lady Caroline Lamb (1972)
- Richard Mathews in Churchill's People (1975)
- Joseph O'Conor in Edward the Seventh (1975)
- Nigel Hawthorne in Victoria & Albert (TV serial) (2001)
- Paul Bettany in The Young Victoria (2009)
- Rufus Sewell in Victoria (2016–2019)

== Robert Peel ==
- Michael Barrington in Edward the Seventh (1975)
- Tom Ward in the TV series The Frankenstein Chronicles (he is depicted while he was still the Home Secretary).
- Michael Maloney in The Young Victoria (2009)
- Nigel Lindsay in Victoria (2016–2017)

== Lord Palmerston ==
Palmerston has been portrayed in the following film and television productions:

- Wallace Bosco in Balaclava (1928)
- Felix Aylmer in:
  - Victoria the Great (1937)
  - Sixty Glorious Years (1938)
  - The Lady with a Lamp (1951)
- Gilbert Emery in A Dispatch from Reuter's (1940)
- André Morell in Edward the Seventh (1975)
- James Fox in 1864 (2014)
- Laurence Fox in Victoria (2016–2019)

== Lord Derby ==
- Frank Cellier in Sixty Glorious Years (1938)
- Owen Nares in The Prime Minister (1941)
- David Wood in Disraeli (1978)

== William Gladstone ==
Gladstone has been portrayed in the following film and television productions:

- Montagu Love in Parnell (1937)
- Arthur Young in:
  - Victoria the Great (1937)
  - The Lady with a Lamp (1951)
- Malcolm Keen in Sixty Glorious Years (1938)
- Stephen Murray in The Prime Minister (1941)
- Gordon Richards in The Imperfect Lady (1947)
- Ralph Richardson in Khartoum (1966)
- Graham Chapman in Monty Python's Flying Circus (1969)
- Willoughby Gray in Young Winston (1972)
- David Steuart in Jennie: Lady Randolph Churchill (1974)
- Michael Hordern in Edward the Seventh (1975)
- John Carlisle in Disraeli (1978)
- John Phillips in Lillie (1978)
- Roland Culver in The Life and Times of David Lloyd George (1981)
- Denis Quilley in Number 10 (1983)

== Lord Salisbury ==
Salisbury has been portrayed in the following film and television productions:

- Harvey Braban in Sixty Glorious Years (1938)
- Leslie Perrins in The Prime Minister (1941)
- Laurence Naismith in Young Winston (1972)
- Llewellyn Rees in Jennie: Lady Randolph Churchill (1974)
- Hugh Dickson in Churchill's People (1975)
- Richard Vernon in Edward the Seventh (1975)
- John Gregg in Disraeli (1978)
- John Gielgud in Murder by Decree (1979)
- John Forbes-Robertson in Number 10 (1983)
- David Swift in Jack the Ripper (1988)
- David Ryall in Around the World in 80 Days (2004)
- Michael Gambon in Victoria & Abdul (2017)

== A. J. Balfour ==
Balfour was the subject of two parody novels based on Alice in Wonderland, Clara in Blunderland (1902) and Lost in Blunderland (1903), which appeared under the pseudonym Caroline Lewis; one of the co-authors was Harold Begbie.

He was portrayed on television in:

- Jennie: Lady Randolph Churchill (1974) by Adrian Ropes.
- episodes 10–12 of Edward the Seventh (1975) by Lyndon Brook.

== Henry Campbell-Bannerman ==
Campbell-Bannerman was portrayed by Geoffrey Bayldon in episodes 12 and 13 of TV series Edward the Seventh (1975).

== H. H. Asquith ==
Asquith was portrayed in the following TV series:

- Basil Dignam in Edward the Seventh (episode 13) (1975)
- David Markham in The Life and Times of David Lloyd George (1981)
- David Langton depicts him as prime minister in Number 10 (1983)
- Frank Finlay in The Lost Prince (2003).

== David Lloyd George ==
- "Lloyd George Knew My Father" is a well-known ditty, with the lyrics "Lloyd George knew my father/Father knew Lloyd George" repeated incessantly to the tune of "Onward, Christian Soldiers". The origin and meaning of the song are disputed. One theory is that it references the peerages-for-cash scandal.
- A feature film, The Life Story of David Lloyd George, was made in 1918 by Ideal Films, suppressed, rediscovered in 1994, and first shown in 1996. Norman Page played the role of Lloyd George.
- In the film British Agent (1934), Lloyd George is portrayed by George C. Pearce.
- In the film Royal Cavalcade (1935), Lloyd George is portrayed by Esme Percy.
- In the film Wilson (1944), Lloyd George is portrayed by Clifford Brooke.
- In 1946 the BBC Home Service broadcast Man of the People, a radio portrait of Lloyd George, written and directed by P. H. Burton and with Clifford Evans as Lloyd George.
- Soviet film Moscow — Genoa (1964) features Lloyd George as a character, portrayed by Vladimir Belokurov.
- Richard Attenborough's film Young Winston (1972) features Lloyd George as a character, portrayed by Anthony Hopkins.
- The Edwardians (1972–1973 miniseries) also features Anthony Hopkins as Lloyd George.
- In the television series Edward the Seventh (1975), Lloyd George is portrayed by Geoffrey Beevers.
- A television series The Life and Times of David Lloyd George was made in 1981. Philip Madoc played Lloyd George.
- In the television series Number 10 (1983), Lloyd George is portrayed by John Stride.
- In the Australian Nine Network TV mini-series Anzacs (1985), Lloyd-George is portrayed by Rhys McConnochie.
- In the television film A Dangerous Man: Lawrence After Arabia (1990), Lloyd George is portrayed by Bernard Lloyd.
- In the Irish historical television film The Treaty (1991), Lloyd George is portrayed by Ian Bannen.
- In the television series The Young Indiana Jones Chronicles (1992–93), Lloyd George is portrayed by Michael Kitchen.
- In the television series Mosley (1998), Lloyd George is portrayed by Windsor Davies.
- In the television film The Lost Prince (2003), Lloyd George is portrayed by Ron Cook.
- In the film Suffragette (2015), Lloyd George is portrayed by Adrian Schiller.
- In Sue Limb’s BBC Radio 4 comedy sitcom Gloomsbury (Series 4, 2017), Lloyd George is parodied as the libidinous Llewd George, played by John Sessions.
- In the film Mr. Jones (2019), Lloyd George is portrayed by Kenneth Cranham.

== Andrew Bonar Law ==
- Bonar Law is briefly mentioned several times in Ken Follett's historical novel Fall of Giants (Book One of the Century Trilogy).
- Bonar Law plays a supporting, if off-screen, role in Upstairs, Downstairs. He is even said to have recommended family patriarch, Richard Bellamy, to be offered a peerage.
- His name is referenced by Julian and Sandy in Round the Horne, in a sketch called "Bona Law".
- Rebecca West's novel Sunflower features a portrait of Bonar Law as the statesman Hurrell.
- Arnold Bennett's novel Lord Raingo features Bonar Law as the chancellor of the exchequer Hasper Clews.
- Lord Dunsany gently satirised the quiet way in which government decisions are made which affect many (but with little input from the many) in his short story The Pearly Beach. It begins "We couldn't remember, any of us at the Club, who it was that first invented the twopenny stamp on cheques. There were eight or nine of us there, and not one of us could put a name to him. Of course, a lot of us knew, but we'd all forgotten it. And that started us talking of the tricks memory plays..." The name they were groping for was that of Bonar Law.
- In the 1981 TV series The Life and Times of David Lloyd George Bonar Law appears in two episodes and is played by Fulton Mackay.

== Stanley Baldwin ==
Baldwin has been portrayed in the following film and television productions:

- The Forsyte Saga (1967), played by Ralph Michael
- The Woman I Love (1972), played by Robert Douglas
- The Gathering Storm (1974), played by Thorley Walters
- Days of Hope (1975), played by Brian Hayes
- Edward & Mrs Simpson (1978), played by David Waller
- The Life and Times of David Lloyd George (1981), played by Paul Curran
- Winston Churchill: The Wilderness Years (1981), played by Peter Barkworth
- Reilly, Ace of Spies (1983), played by Donald Morley
- The Woman He Loved (1988), played by David Waller
- You Rang, M'Lord? (1991), played by Patrick Blackwell
- The Gathering Storm (2002), played by Derek Jacobi
- Wallis & Edward (2005), played by Richard Johnson
- The King's Speech (2010), played by Anthony Andrews
- W.E. (2011), played by Geoffrey Palmer

The character of ‘’Stanley’’ (referred to in his only book appearance as ‘’No. 2’’) from the British children’s book series ‘The Railway Series’’, a Baldwin Class 10-12-D locomotive, was named after Baldwin.

== Ramsay MacDonald ==
- The main villain of the 1907 novel Lord of the World by Robert Hugh Benson was partly based on MacDonald.
- In Howard Spring's 1940 novel Fame is the Spur, later made into a 1947 film and a 1982 TV adaptation, the lead character Hamer Shawcross loosely resembles MacDonald; it is the story of a working-class Labour activist who grows into an establishment politician.
- He is also mentioned and featured in Noël Coward's 1944 film This Happy Breed.
- In the 1981 television series Winston Churchill: The Wilderness Years, MacDonald appears as a significant character in the early episodes and is played by Robert James.
- In the 1982 film Gandhi, he is portrayed by Terrence Hardiman.
- In Graham Greene's 1934 novel It's a Battlefield, MacDonald's name repeatedly appears in newspapers and on billboards in reference to a visit to Lossiemouth.
- In the twenty-fourth episode of Monty Python's Flying Circus, original footage of MacDonald entering No. 10 Downing Street is followed by a black-and-white film of him (played by Michael Palin) doing a striptease, revealing garter belt, suspender and stockings.
- In the 1983 television series Number 10, he was portrayed by Ian Richardson.
- In Thomas Pynchon's Gravity's Rainbow, Old Brigadier Ernest Pudding during his initial interwar retirement "started in on a mammoth work entitled Things That Can Happen in European Politics. Begin, of course, with England. 'First,' he wrote, 'Bereshith, as it were: Ramsay MacDonald can die.' By the time he went through resulting party alignments and possible permutations of cabinet posts, Ramsay MacDonald had died."
- In the 1998 television series Mosley, he was portrayed by Ralph Riach.
- In the YouTube analog horror series War of the Worlds 1934, MacDonald gives a speech in the eleventh episode addressing the ongoing Martian invasion. He is voiced by the series' creator.

== Neville Chamberlain ==
Chamberlain has been portrayed in the following films and television productions:

- E. G. Miller in Citizen Kane (1941)
- Robin Bailey in The Gathering Storm (1974)
- Edward Jewesbury in Churchill and the Generals (1979)
- Eric Porter in Winston Churchill: The Wilderness Years (1981)
- Michael Aldridge in Countdown to War (1989)
- Richard Clarke in The Kennedys of Massachusetts (1990)
- Patrick Cargill in Heil Honey I'm Home! (1990)
- Roger Brierley in Mosley (1998)
- Christopher Good in Dunkirk (2004)
- Oliver Muirhead in An American Carol (2008)
- Jack Shepherd in Into the Storm (2009)
- Roger Parrott in The King's Speech (2010)
- Rupert Frazer in Downton Abbey (2015)
- Ronald Pickup in Darkest Hour (2017)
- Jeremy Irons in Munich – The Edge of War (2021)

== Clement Attlee ==
=== Literature ===
Clement Attlee composed this limerick about himself to demonstrate how he was often underestimated:

Few thought he was even a starter.
There were many who thought themselves smarter.
But he finished PM,
CH and OM,
An earl and a Knight of the Garter.

An alternative version also exists, which may reflect Attlee's use of English more closely:

There were few who thought him a starter,
Many who thought themselves smarter.
But he ended PM,
CH and OM,
an Earl and a Knight of the Garter.

=== Drama ===
- Played by Patrick Troughton in Edward & Mrs. Simpson.
- Played by Patrick Stewart in the 1974 BBC-TV production The Gathering Storm.
- A character in the play Tom and Clem, by Stephen Churchett. In the original production in 1997, Alec McCowen played Attlee, and Michael Gambon played Tom Driberg.
- Played by Alan David in the final episode of the BBC sitcom Goodnight Sweetheart.
- The main character in the BBC Radio 4 Saturday Play episode That Man Attlee. Broadcast on 15 September 2007, it was written by Robin Glendinning, with Bill Wallis playing Attlee.
- Played by his grandson Richard Attlee, in the TV series Dunkirk in 2004, and in Jerome Vincent's "Stuffing Their Mouths with Gold", the story of how the National Health Service came to be. Broadcast on Radio 4 on 4 July 2008, the day before the 60th anniversary of the founding of the NHS.
- Played by Bill Paterson in Into the Storm (2009).
- Played by Michael Sheldon in Three Days in May by Ben Brown on a national tour and at Trafalgar Studios (2011–12).
- Played by Simon Chandler in the Netflix series The Crown (2016).

=== Film ===
- Attlee is portrayed by David Schofield in Darkest Hour (2017).

== Anthony Eden ==
=== Literature ===
- Eden appears as a character in James P. Hogan's science-fiction novel The Proteus Operation.
- In Harry Turtledove's novel, The Big Switch, Eden appears as a member of a group of disgruntled MPs who are gathered together by Ronald Cartland after Britain allies with Germany in mid-1940.
- In Harry Turtledove's Worldwar series of alternate history science-fiction novels, Eden first appears as the representative of the United Kingdom at the peace talks with the alien Race in Cairo. As it does not have nuclear weapons at that point in the story, the United Kingdom is not fully recognised by the Race, but is also too powerful for them to fully discount. Eden attempts to secure full recognition of the United Kingdom by the Race, but fails. Atvar, the Race's commander, notes that Eden is highly competent but attempting to negotiate from a position of weakness. In the succeeding series, Colonization, Eden is prime minister in 1962, leading a government which cultivates close relations with the German Reich. When Germany and the Race go to war, Eden refuses to lend British military assistance to the Reich, though formally supports German efforts against the Race.

=== Music ===
- Eden is mentioned in a song by The Kinks, "She's Bought a Hat Like Princess Marina", from the album Arthur (1969).

=== Plays ===
- Eden appears as a character in the play Never So Good (2008)—portrayed as a hysterical, pill-addicted wreck, spying on members of his own Cabinet by ordering government chauffeurs to report on their comings and goings. He is shown being overwhelmed by the chaos of the Suez Crisis and eventually forced out of office by his Conservative Party colleagues, at the urging of the American government.
- Eden appears in Peter Morgan's stage play The Audience (2013); in the premiere, he was played by Michael Elwyn. In the 2015 West End revival version, featuring Kristin Scott Thomas as the Queen, Eden is portrayed by Scottish actor David Robb. His scene in the play is a prediction of Eden's audience with the Queen the day before the invasion of Anglo-French forces in Egypt. The conversation that takes place features Eden attempting to feed selected information to the Queen rather than the whole facts about the Suez crisis and the Queen's reaction to the proposed invasion. In the play's 2015 rewrite, the Queen makes reference to Tony Blair, seen in a flashback, and his proposal to send troops to Iraq, likening it to the conversation she'd had with Eden 50 years previously about Suez.

=== Television ===
- As Secretary of State for War in 1940, Eden authorised the setting-up of the Local Defence Volunteers (soon renamed the Home Guard). In the film of the TV sitcom Dad's Army, the (fictional) Walmington-on-Sea platoon is formed in response to Eden's radio broadcast. Platoon second-in-command Sergeant Wilson is flattered when his resemblance to Eden is remarked upon.
- Eden is portrayed by Jeremy Northam in the Netflix television series The Crown.
- Eden is portrayed by Anthony Calf in the BBC television series Upstairs Downstairs (2010 edition).
- The first season of the UK TV series The Hour revolves around the Suez Crisis and the effect of journalism and censorship on the public's perception of Eden and his government, as a metaphor for modern Western military involvement in the Middle East.
- In the Ian Curteis television play Suez 1956 (1979), Michael Gough portrayed Eden.
- In the 1978 television series Edward & Mrs Simpson he was portrayed by Hugh Fraser

=== Film ===
- Eden is portrayed by Samuel West in Darkest Hour (2017).

== Harold Macmillan ==
- Beyond the Fringe (1960–1966)
  - During his premiership in the early 1960s Macmillan was savagely satirised for his alleged decrepitude by the comedian Peter Cook in the stage revue Beyond the Fringe. 'Even when insulted to his face attending the show,' a biographer notes, 'Macmillan felt it was better to be mocked than ignored.' One of the sketches was revived by Cook for television. Cook would later claim that his impression of Macmillan 'was in fact extremely affectionate. I was a great Macmillan fan. He did have this somewhat ludicrous manner, but merely because it was the first time for some years that a living prime minister had been impersonated on the stage, a great deal of weight was attached to it.'
- Suez 1956 (1979)
  - Richard Vernon stars as Macmillan, with Michael Gough as Eden, in a three-hour-and-ten-minute BBC television play by Ian Curteis.
- Winston Churchill: The Wilderness Years (1981)
  - Macmillan appears as a supporting character, played by Ian Collier, in the miniseries produced by Southern Television for ITV.
- A Letter of Resignation (1997–98)
  - Set in 1963 during the Profumo scandal, Hugh Whitemore's play A Letter of Resignation, first staged at the Comedy Theatre in October 1997, dramatises the occasion when Macmillan, staying with friends in Scotland, received a political bombshell, the letter of resignation from Profumo, his war minister. Edward Fox portrayed Macmillan with uncanny accuracy, but the play also explores the involvement of MI5 and the troubled relationship between Macmillan and his wife (played by Clare Higgins) who had made no secret of her adultery with the wayward Tory MP, Robert Boothby. The play was directed by Christopher Morahan.
- Eden's Empire (2006)
  - Macmillan was played by Kevin Quarmby in Gemma Fairlie's production of James Graham's play Eden's Empire at the Finborough Theatre, London, in 2006.
- Never So Good (2008)
  - Never So Good is a four-act play by Howard Brenton, a portrait of Macmillan against a backdrop of fading Empire, two world wars, the Suez crisis, adultery and Tory politics at the Ritz. Brenton paints the portrait of a brilliant, witty but complex man, tragically out of kilter with his times, an Old Etonian who eventually loses his way in a world of shifting values. The play premiered at the National Theatre in March 2008, directed by Howard Davies with Jeremy Irons as Macmillan.
- The Crown (2016)
  - Macmillan is portrayed by Anton Lesser in the Netflix series The Crown.
- Pennyworth (2019)
  - Macmillan is portrayed by Richard Clothier in the Epix series Pennyworth.
- Nolly (2023)
  - Macmillan is portrayed by Nicholas Gecks in the ITVX miniseries Nolly, dramatising the life of Noele Gordon.

== Alec Douglas-Home ==
- The Night They Tried to Kidnap the Prime Minister (2009), played by Tim McInnerny – a BBC Radio 4 drama based on a real-life kidnapping attempt in 1964.
- The Crown (2016), played by David Annen.

== Harold Wilson ==
=== Television ===
- The Lavender List (2006), played by Kenneth Cranham – a BBC Four fictionalised account by Francis Wheen of the Wilson Government of 1974–1976, with Gina McKee as Marcia Williams and Celia Imrie as Wilson's wife. The play concentrated on Wilson and Williams' relationship and her conflict with the Downing Street Press Secretary Joe Haines.
- The Plot Against Harold Wilson (2006), played by James Bolam – aired on BBC Two on 16 March 2006. The drama detailed previously unseen evidence that rogue elements of MI5 and the British military plotted to take down the Labour Government, believing Wilson to be a Soviet spy.
- Longford (2006), played by Robert Pugh – Channel 4 drama on the life of Lord Longford. In one scene, Wilson was seen dismissing Longford from his cabinet in 1968, in part because of the adverse publicity the latter was receiving for his public campaign supporting Myra Hindley, then incarcerated for her involvement in the Moors Murders.
- In series 3 of The Crown, Harold Wilson is portrayed by Jason Watkins.
- In Stonehouse, a dramatisation of the career of John Stonehouse, Wilson is portrayed by Kevin McNally.

=== Film ===
- The Boat That Rocked (2009), played by Stephen Moore (character not actually addressed or credited by name, only as 'Prime Minister')
- Made in Dagenham (2010), played by John Sessions

=== Other ===
- A Viking in the Asterix story Asterix and the Great Crossing (1975) is named Haraldwilssen in the English translation, because the translators felt his physical features resembled Wilson.
- The Audience (stage play, 2013, played in the premiere production by Richard McCabe)
- In The Alteration by Kingsley Amis, set in a parallel universe dominated by the papacy, Pope John XXIV is depicted as a Machiavellian Yorkshireman (a thinly veiled portrayal of Wilson) who controls the population of Europe through Malthusian means including the use of bacteriological warfare and war with the Ottoman Empire.
- He is briefly referenced in the Beatles song "Taxman", together with his political opponent Edward Heath.

== Edward Heath ==
- Sunday (2002), played by Corin Redgrave
- The Long Walk to Finchley (2008), played by Samuel West
- Margaret (2009), played by Nigel Le Vaillant
- The Iron Lady (2011), played by John Sessions
- The Crown (2016), played by Michael Maloney

== James Callaghan ==
- The Audience (stage play, 2013, played in the premiere production by David Peart)

== Theresa May ==
- Gillian Bevan played Theresa May in the second series of the Channel 4 comedy The Windsors.
- Jacqueline King played Theresa May in the 2017 docudrama Theresa v Boris: How May Became PM which chronicled the 2016 Conservative leadership election

== Boris Johnson ==
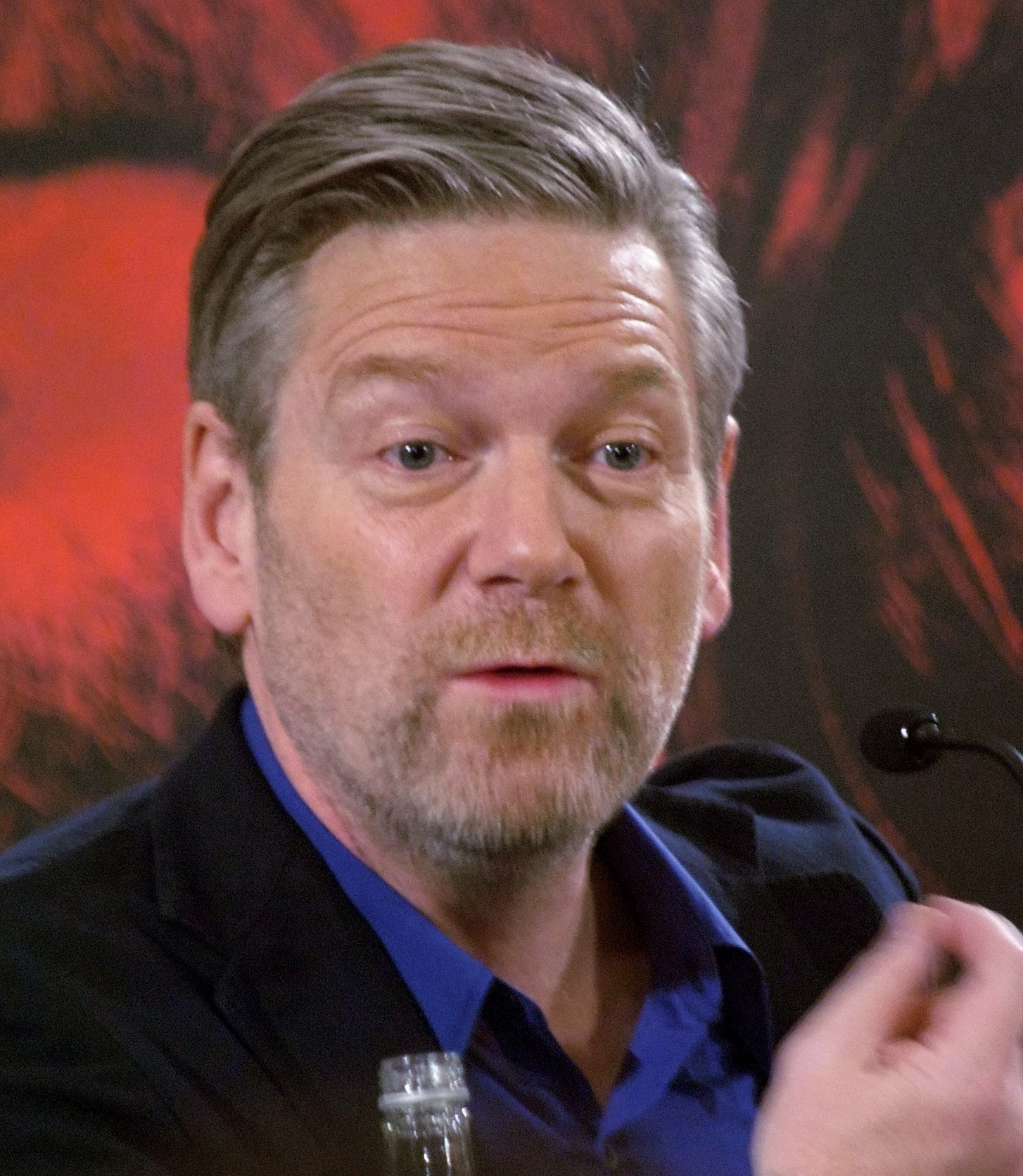
Johnson was portrayed by Kenneth Branagh in the 2022 Sky Atlantic drama This England.

The political career of Johnson has been the subject of several television docudramas:

- Stuart McQuarrie in the 2005 television film A Very Social Secretary
- Christian Brassington in the More4 drama documentary When Boris Met Dave
- Will Barton in the 2017 BBC-produced drama Theresa vs. Boris: How May Became PM
- Richard Goulding in the 2019 HBO and Channel 4 drama Brexit: The Uncivil War
- Kenneth Branagh in the 2022 Sky Atlantic drama This England

Johnson's bumbling mannerisms and distinctive hairstyle have also made him the subject of parody:

- In the 2008–2012 children's TV cartoon series Ben & Holly's Little Kingdom, the mayor of Fairy Town, voiced by Alexander Armstrong, is based on Johnson, who was mayor of London at the time
- Johnson is voiced by Lewis MacLeod in the fourth and fifth series of 2DTV
- MacLeod also voices Johnson in Newzoids
- Johnson is portrayed as a half man-half dog personage who would rather engage in acts of canine behaviour like chasing his tail than answering questions, in Headcases. He is voiced by Jon Culshaw
- The music video for Stormzy's "Vossi Bop" features backup dancers donning wigs similar to Boris's hairstyle and throwing them on the ground just as the line "fuck the government, fuck Boris" comes in
- In 2019, James Corden portrayed Johnson in a sketch on Saturday Night Live
- In the 2020 revival of Spitting Image, Johnson's puppet is voiced by Matt Forde

Johnson has been the subject of British music and music media:

- Singer Robbie Williams portrays Boris Johnson in the music video for his 2020 festive single "Can't Stop Christmas"
- Johnson was the focus of the 2020 song "Boris Johnson Is a Fucking Cunt" by Kunt and the Gang, which reached number five on the UK Singles Chart. He was also the focus of the single's follow-up, "Boris Johnson Is Still a Fucking Cunt", released in 2021
