= Number 10 (TV series) =

1983 British television series

Number 10 is a 1983 British television series that originally aired on ITV and lasted for 7 episodes from 13 February to 27 March 1983. It depicted the personal and political lives of seven British Prime Ministers, ranging from the 1780s to the 1920s, during their occupancy of 10 Downing Street. The series is a revealing insight on some of the more personal incidents in the lives of past British Prime Ministers and explores the effect the Prime Ministers had on the house.

== Cast ==
=== The prime ministers ===
- Denis Quilley as William Gladstone (Episode 1: 'Old Glad Eyes')
- Ian Richardson as Ramsay MacDonald (Episode 2: 'Underdog')
- John Stride as David Lloyd George (Episode 3: 'A Woman of Style')
- Bernard Archard as Duke of Wellington (Episode 4: 'The Iron Duke')
- David Langton as H. H. Asquith (Episode 5: 'The Asquiths')
- Richard Pasco as Benjamin Disraeli (Episode 6: 'Dizzy')
- Jeremy Brett as William Pitt the Younger (Episode 7: 'Bloodline')

=== Selected others ===
- Gabrielle Drake as Harriet Arbuthnot
- Caroline Langrishe as Eleanor Eden
- Frances Bennett as Duchess of Gordon
- Barbara Kellerman as Frances Stevenson
- Alfred Burke as William Pitt the Elder
- Keith Barron as Earl of Chatham
- Patrick Newell as Lord North
- David Ryall as Charles James Fox
- Terence Harvey as Winston Churchill
- David Neal as Anthony Addington
- Jeffrey Wickham as Duke of Richmond
- Charles Stapley as Lord Auckland
- Duncan Royce Hiley Addington
- Philip Latham as Charles Arbuthnot
- Peter Gale as Robert Peel
- Michael Barrington as William Huskisson

== Production ==
Yorkshire Television built an exact replica of No. 10 Downing Street for the series in a massive warehouse outside Leeds.
