= List of Japanese snacks =

This is a list of Japanese snacks (お菓子, okashi) and finger foods. It includes both brand name and generic snacks.

== Types ==
=== Anko, or sweet bean paste ===
Anko is a kind of sweet bean paste. Anko is mainly eaten during the afternoon green tea time in Japan. School students eat it after school, at home.

- Anmitsu

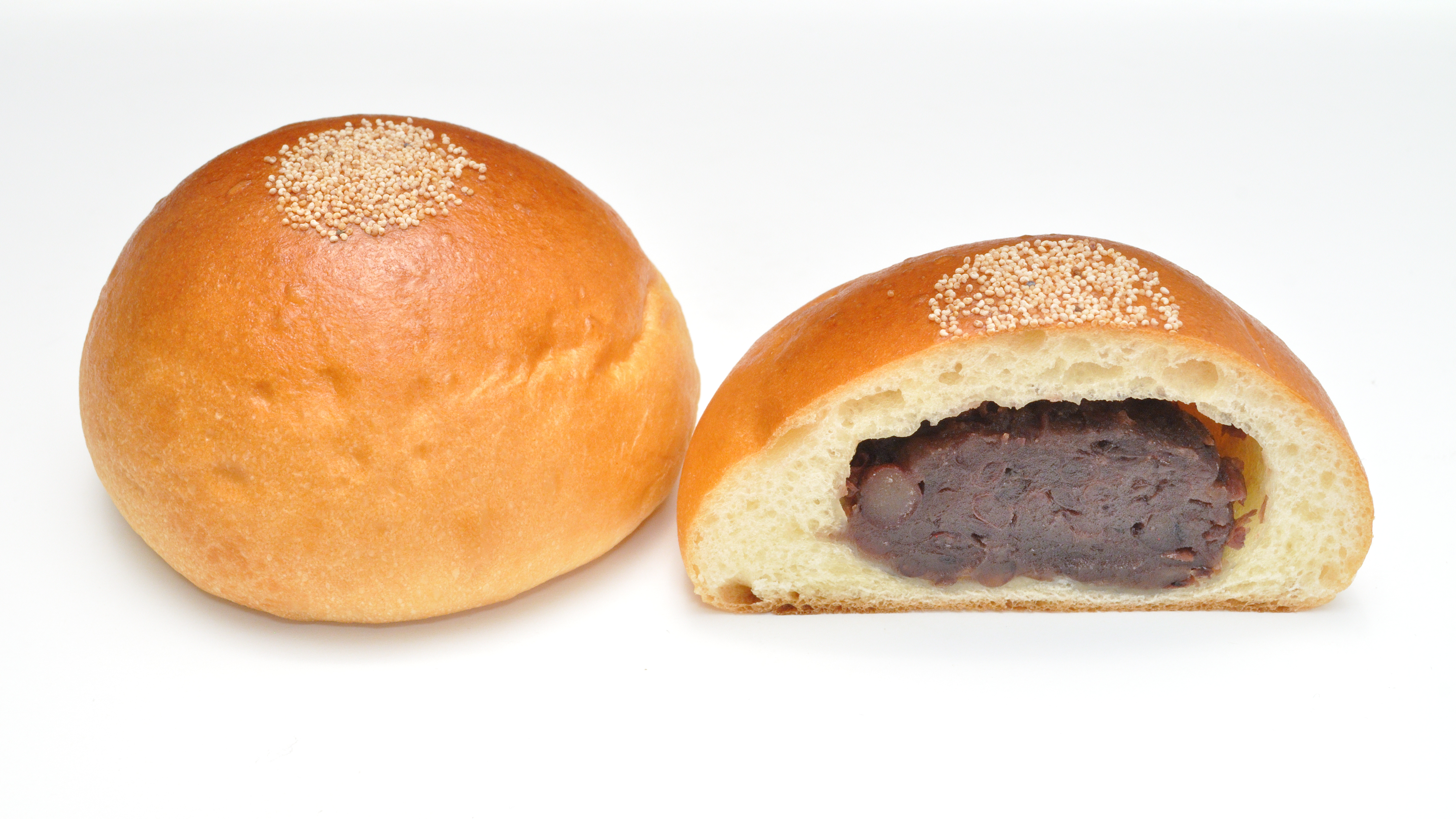
Anpan

- Anpan
- Botamochi
- Daifuku
  - Ichigodaifuku - Daifuku with strawberry
- Dorayaki
- Manjū
- Monaka
- Imagawayaki
- Kusa mochi
- Taiyaki
- Yōkan
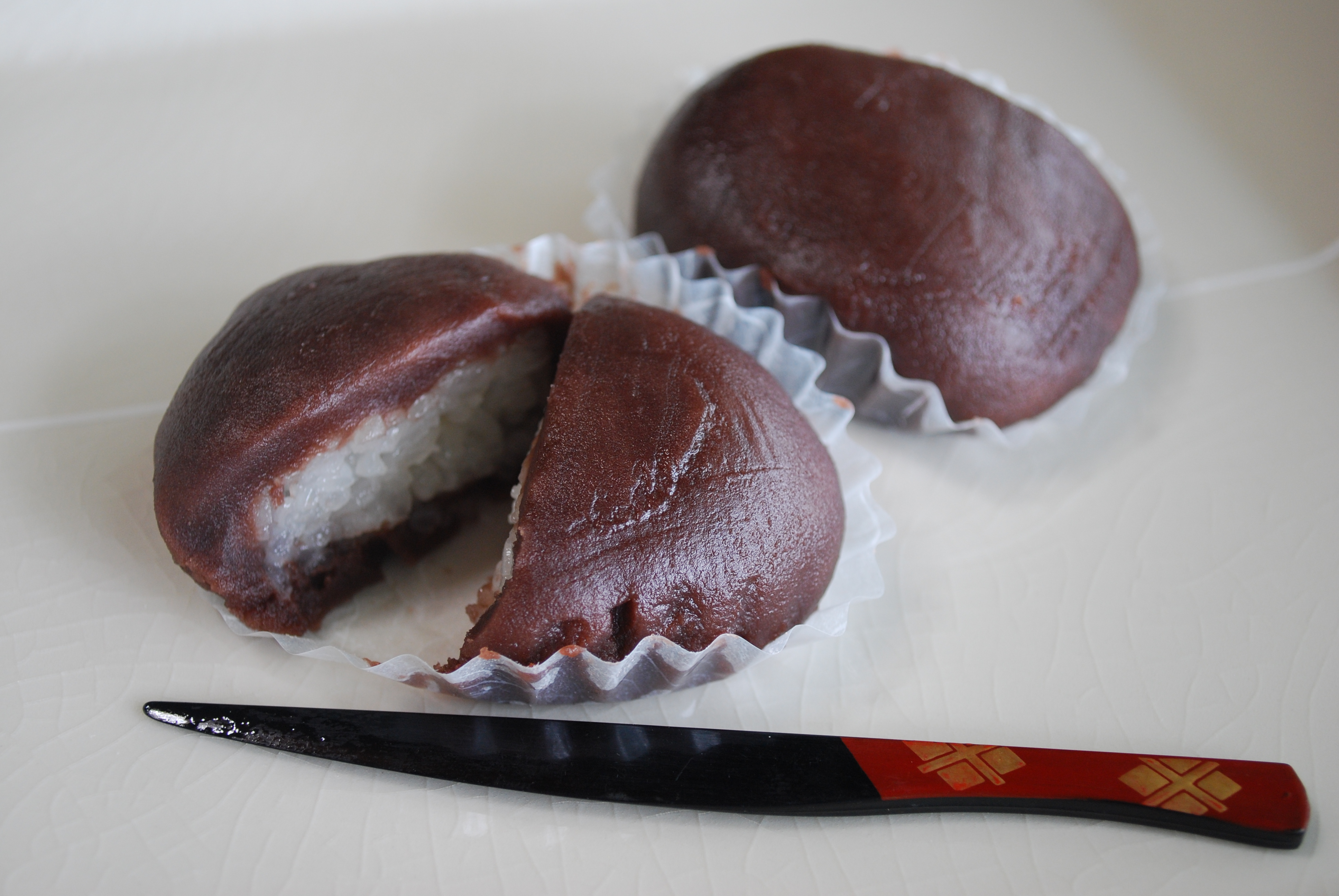
Botamochi

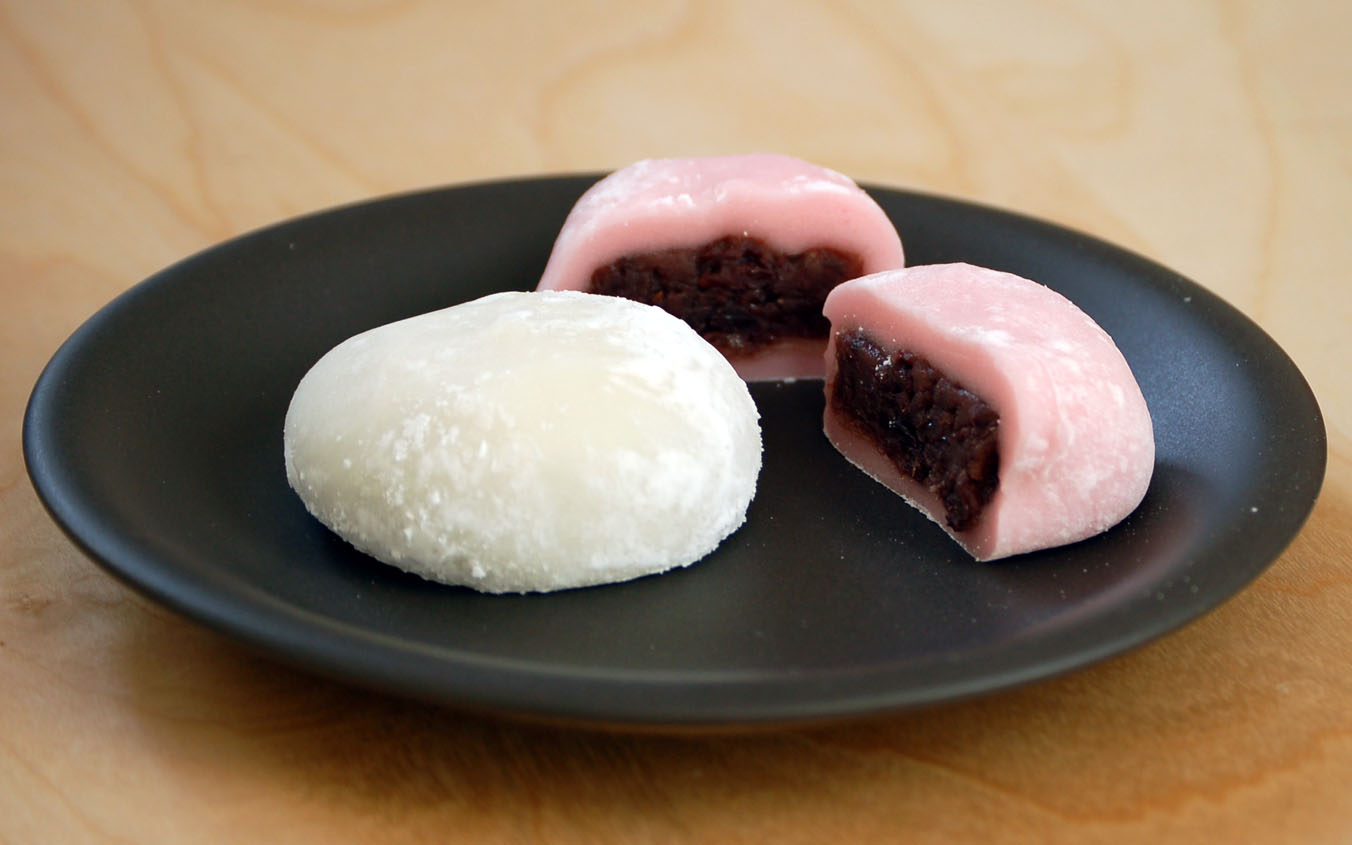
Daifuku

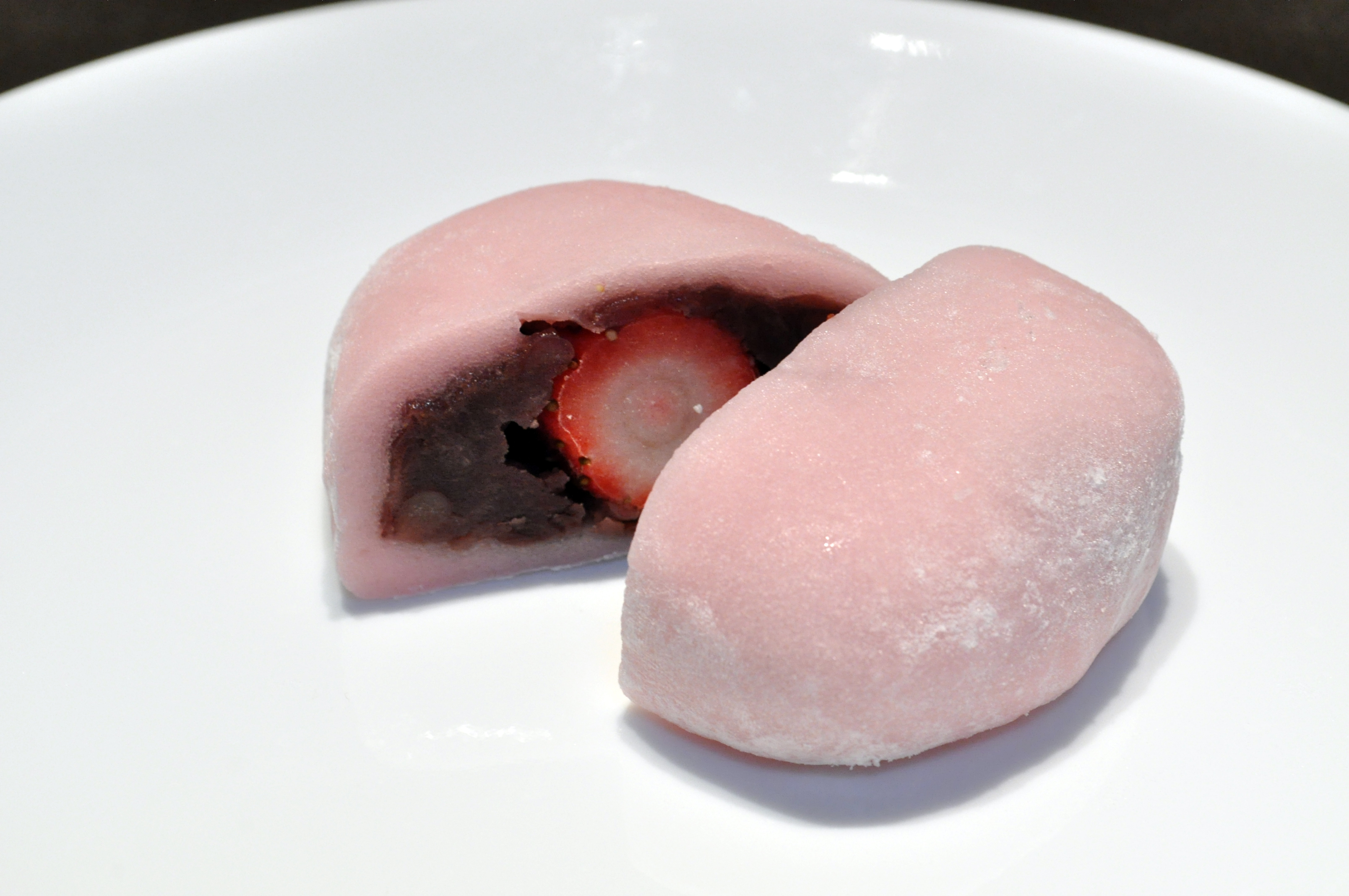
Ichigo daifuku

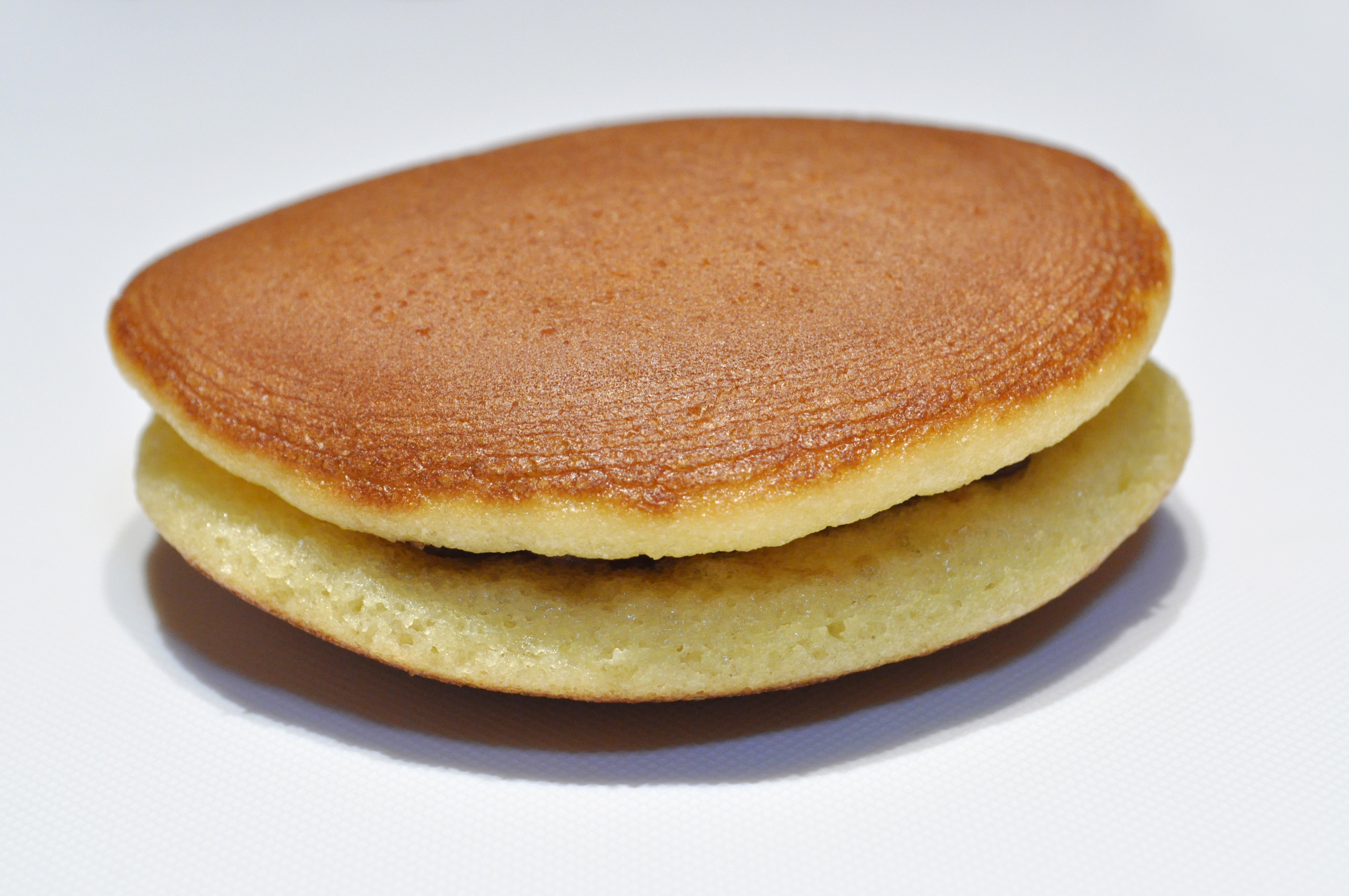
Dorayaki

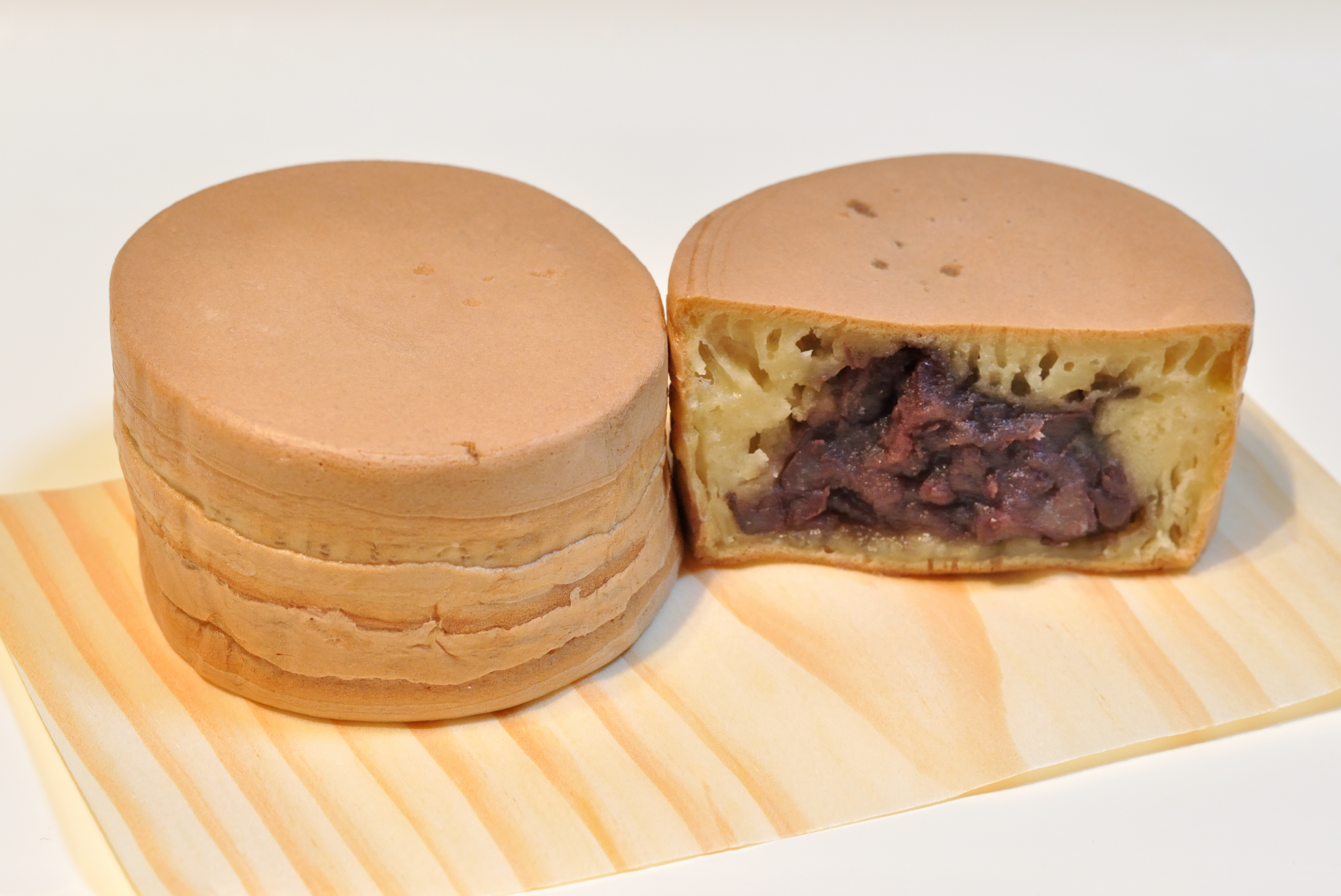
Imagawayaki

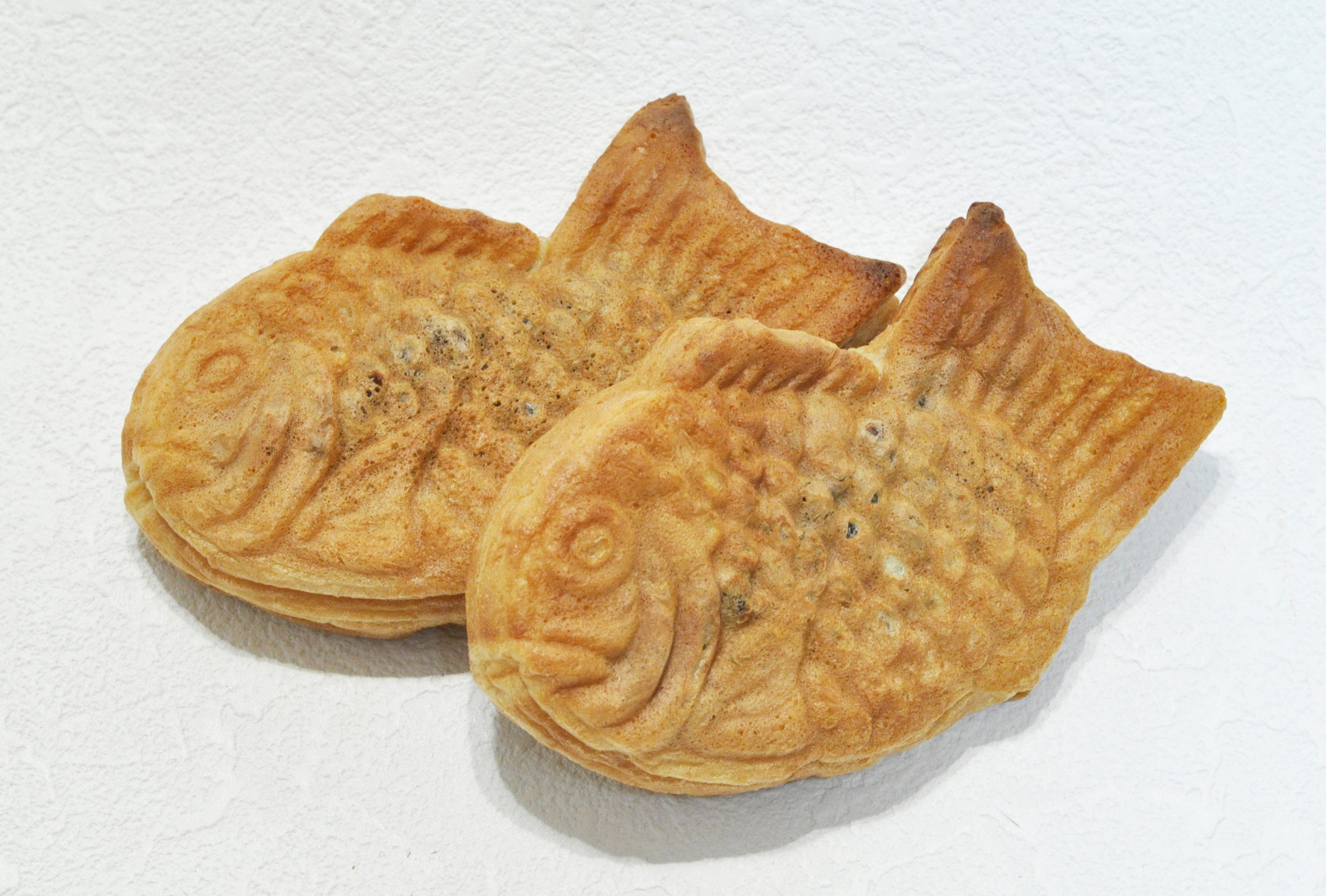
Taiyaki

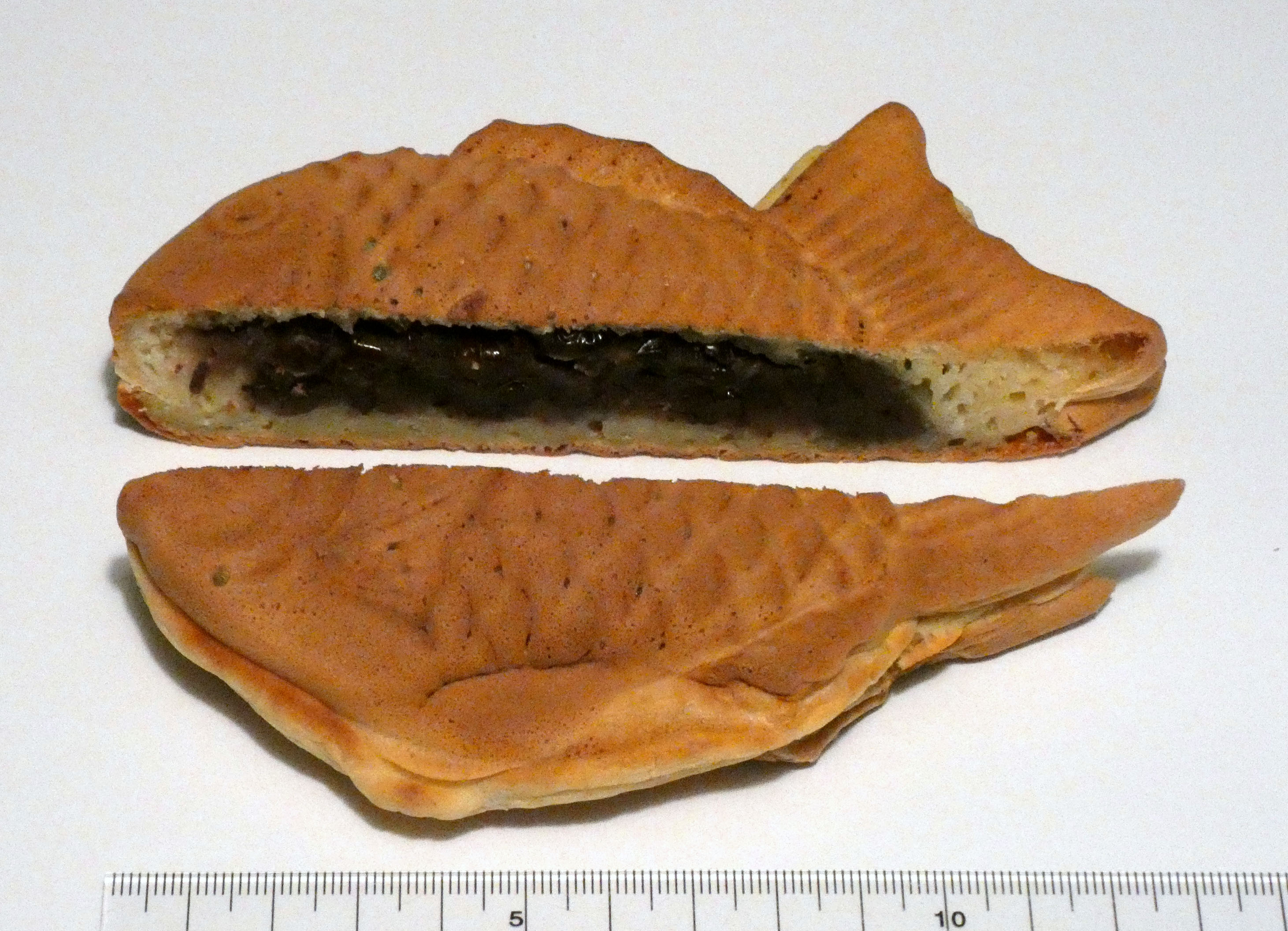
Cut surface of taiyaki

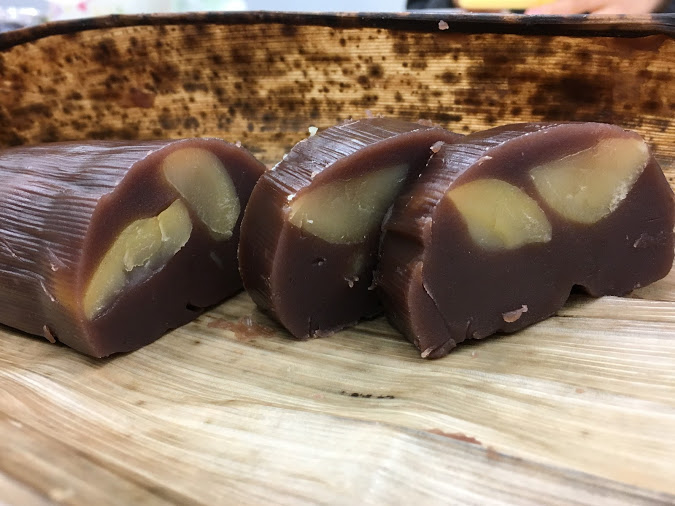
Yōkan with chestnut

=== Bean ===
Beans with salt are mainly taken with beer in the evening.

- Edamame
- Soramame - boiled broad bean
- Ikarimame - fried broad bean
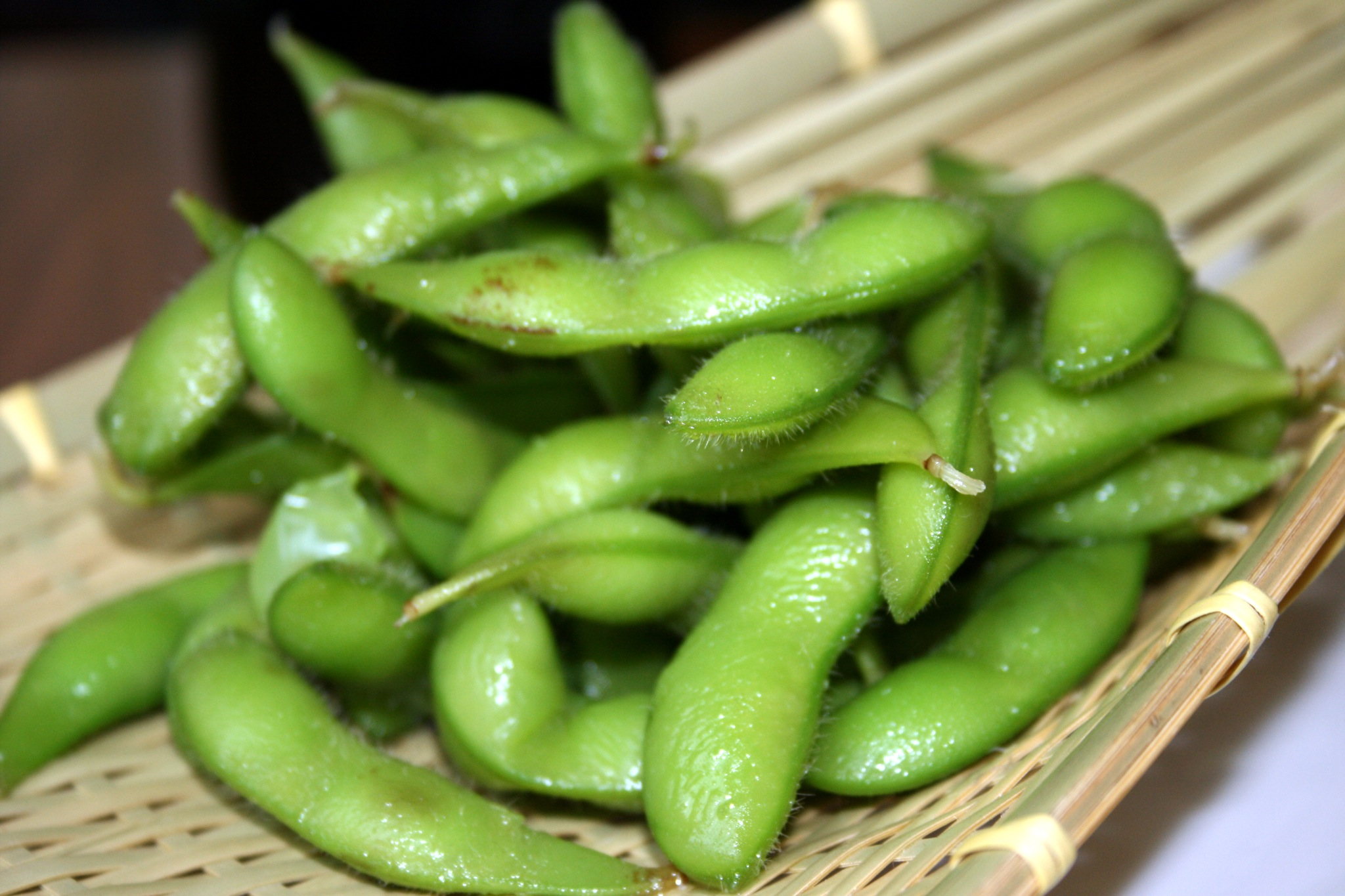
Edamame

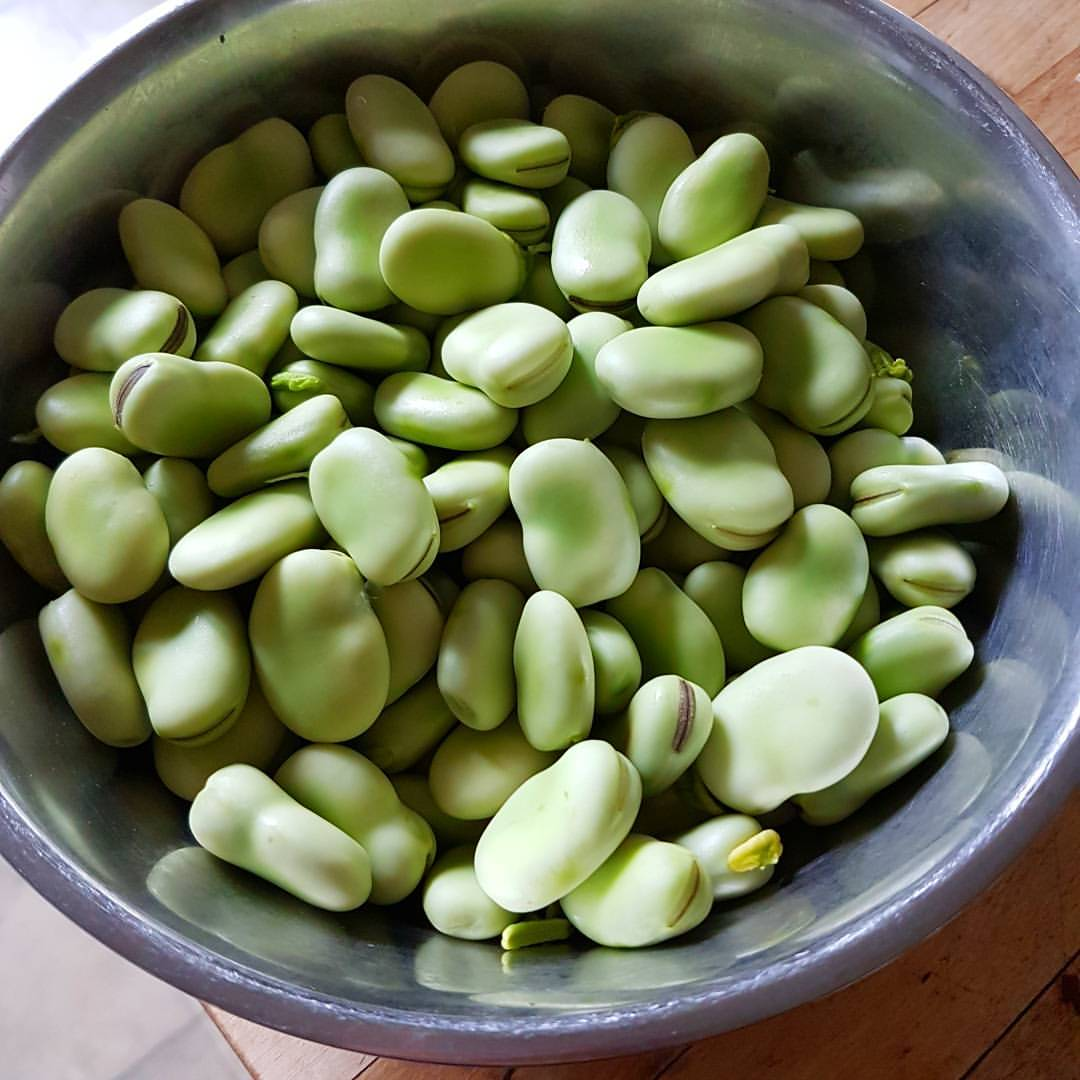
Soramame

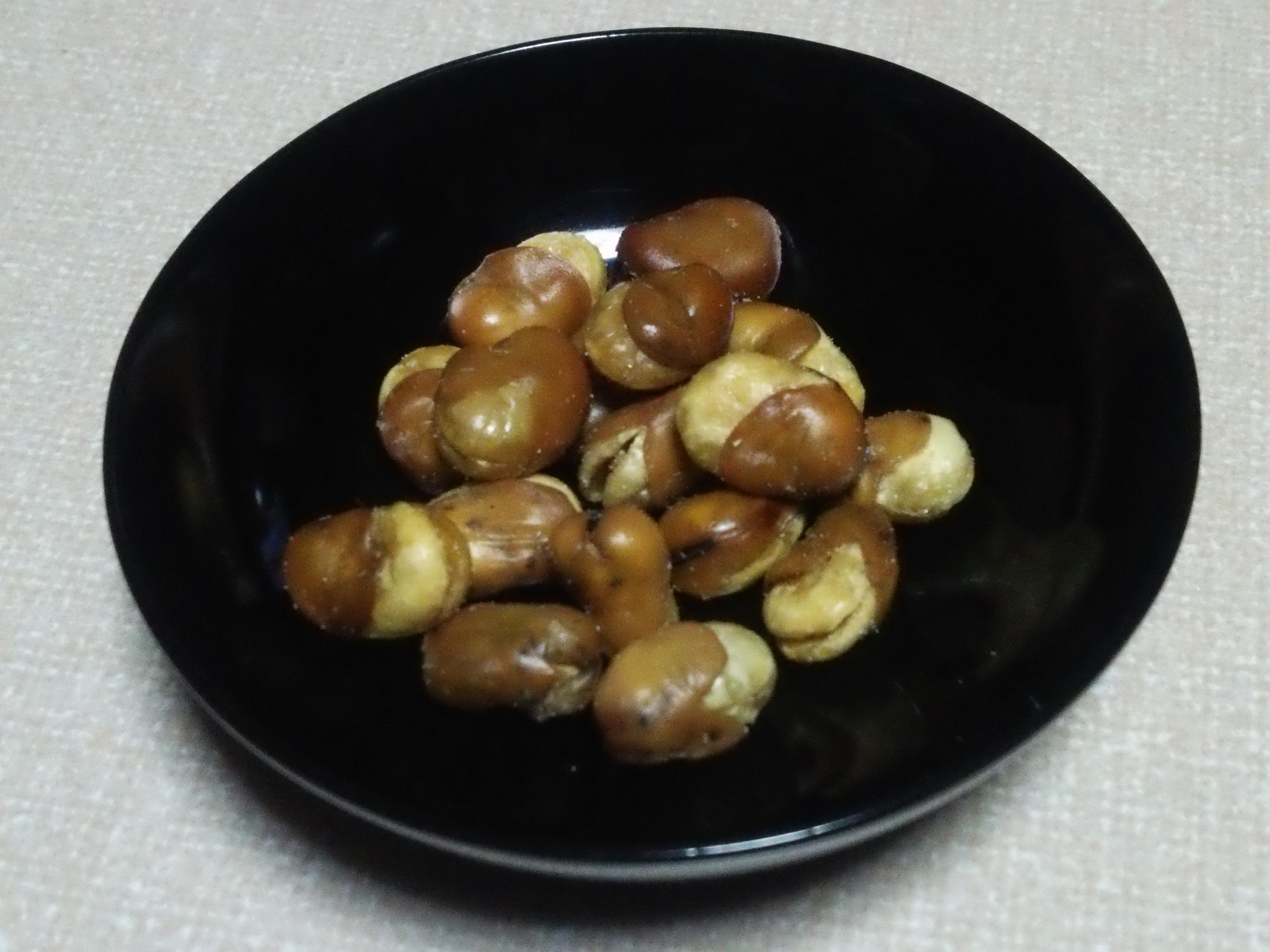
Ikarimame

=== Bread/Wheat Flour ===
generic

- Karintō – deep-fried brown sugar snack
- Monjayaki
- Okonomiyaki
- Takoyaki
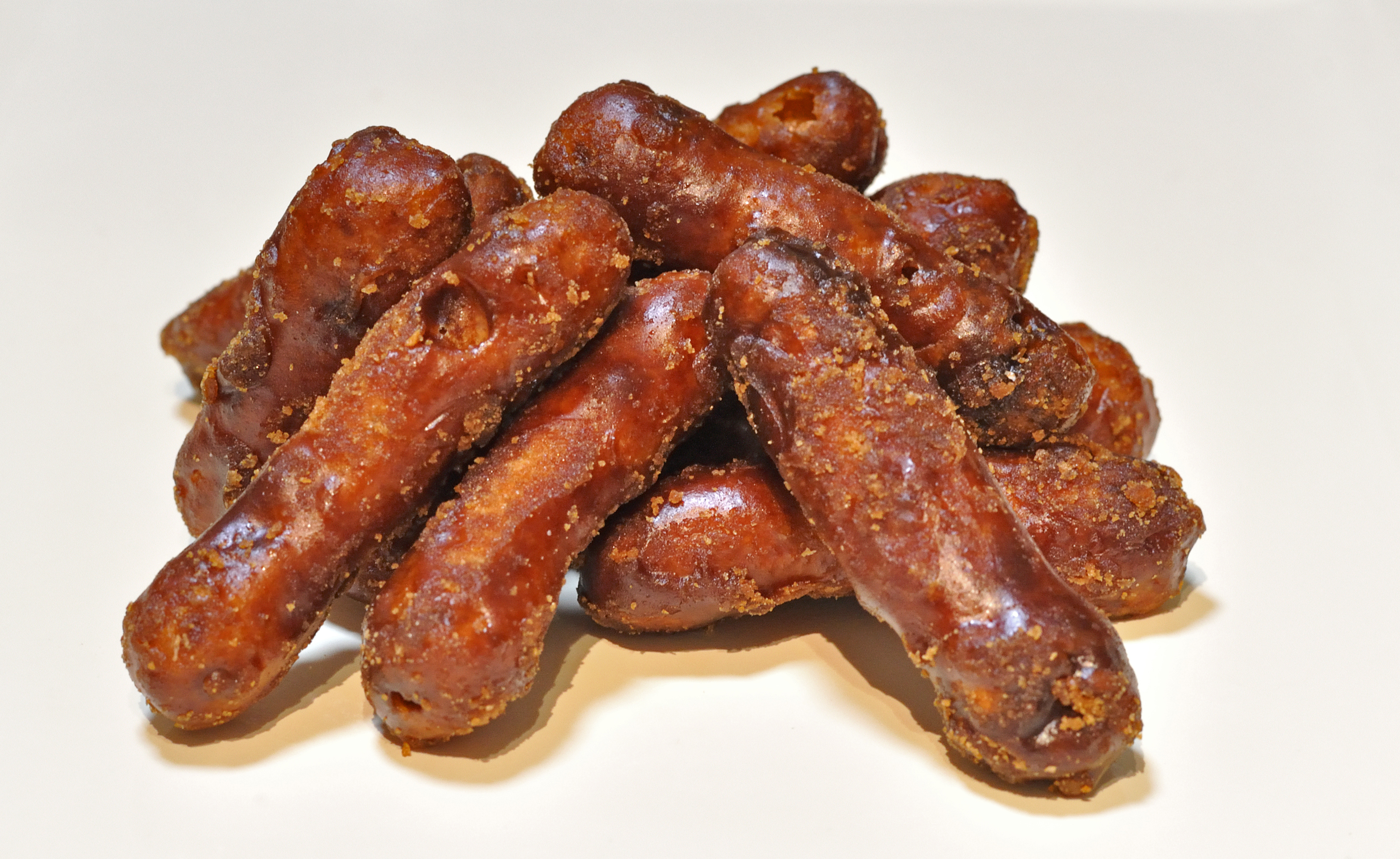
Karintō

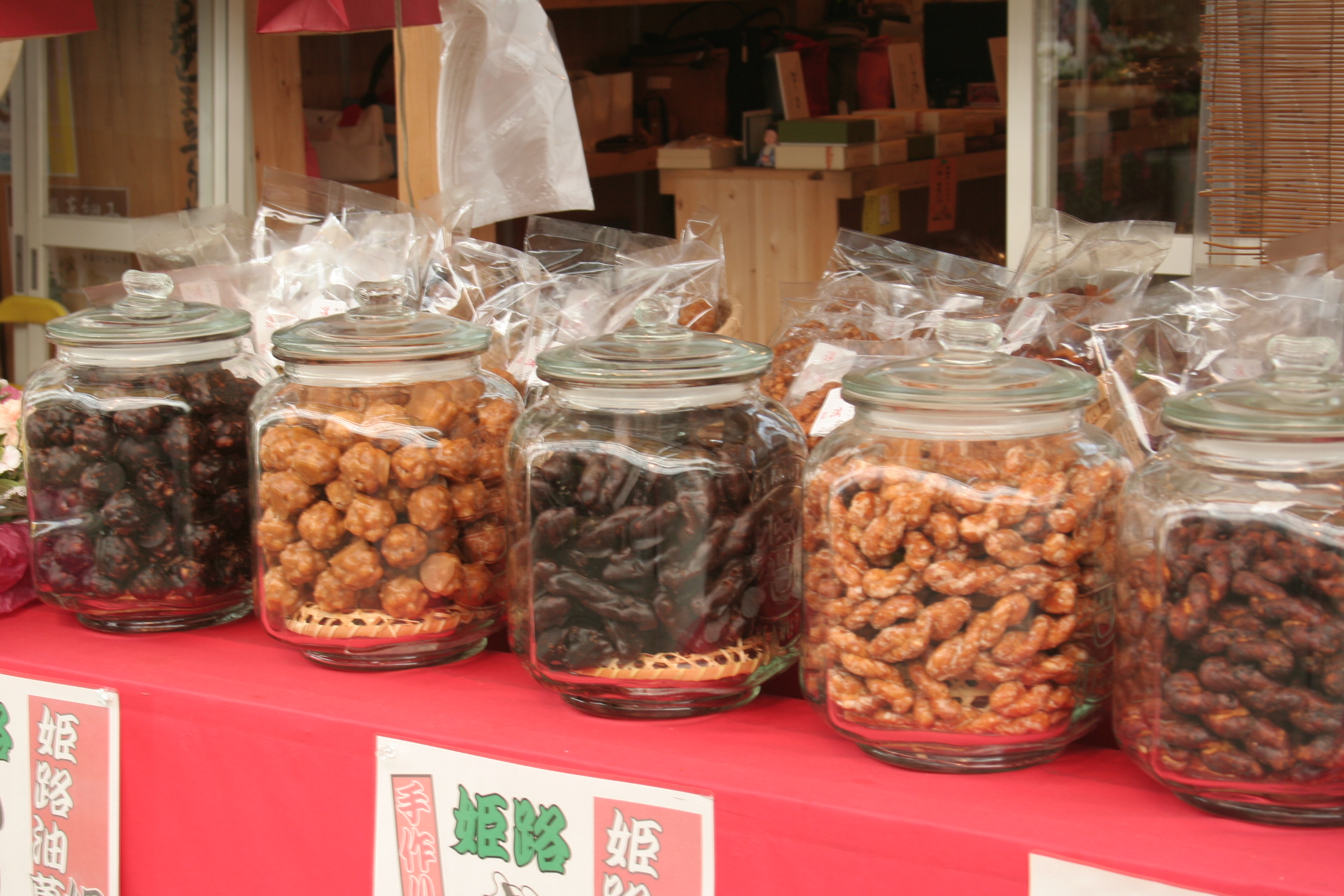
Karintō in bottles

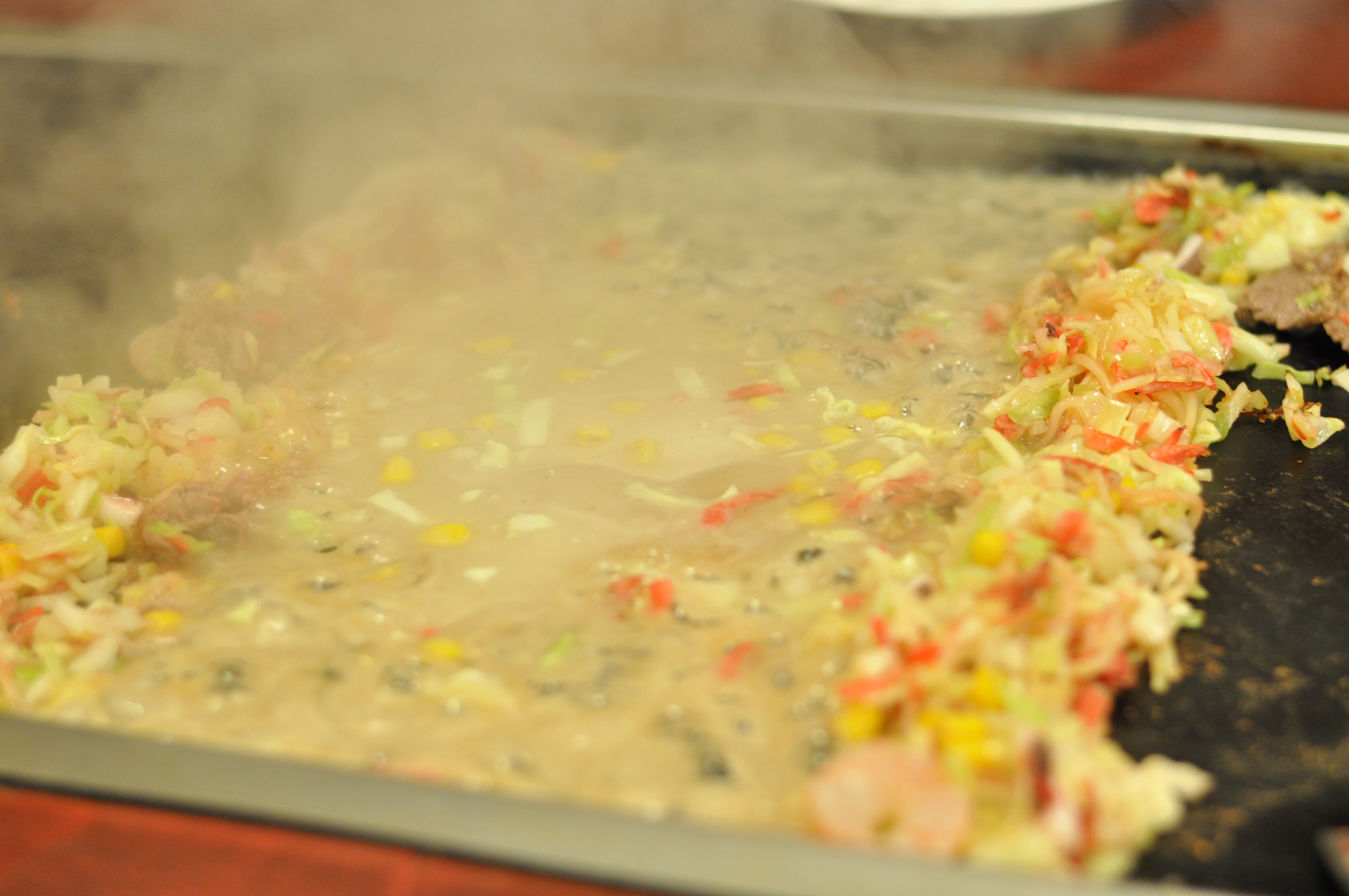
Monjayaki

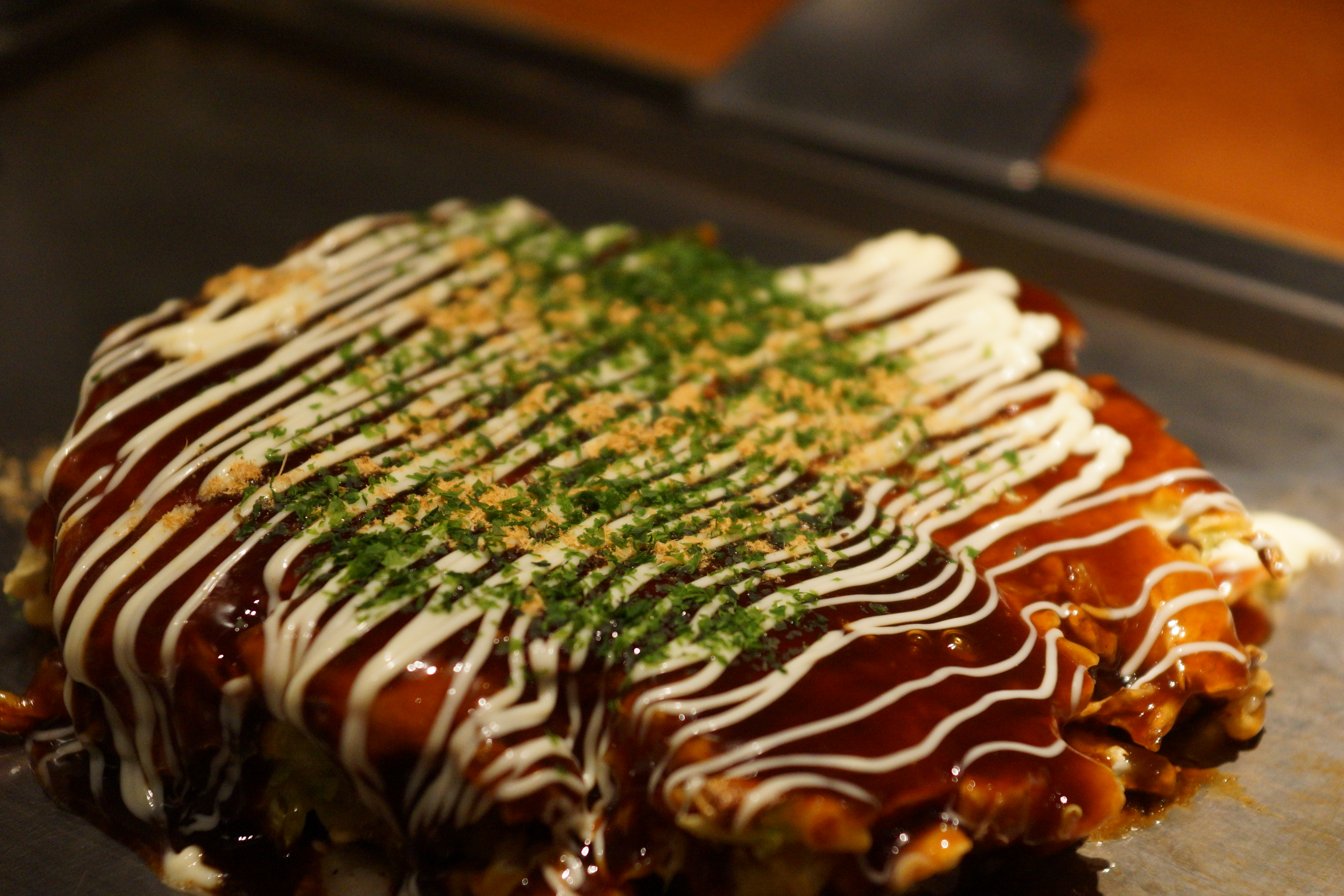
Okonomiyaki

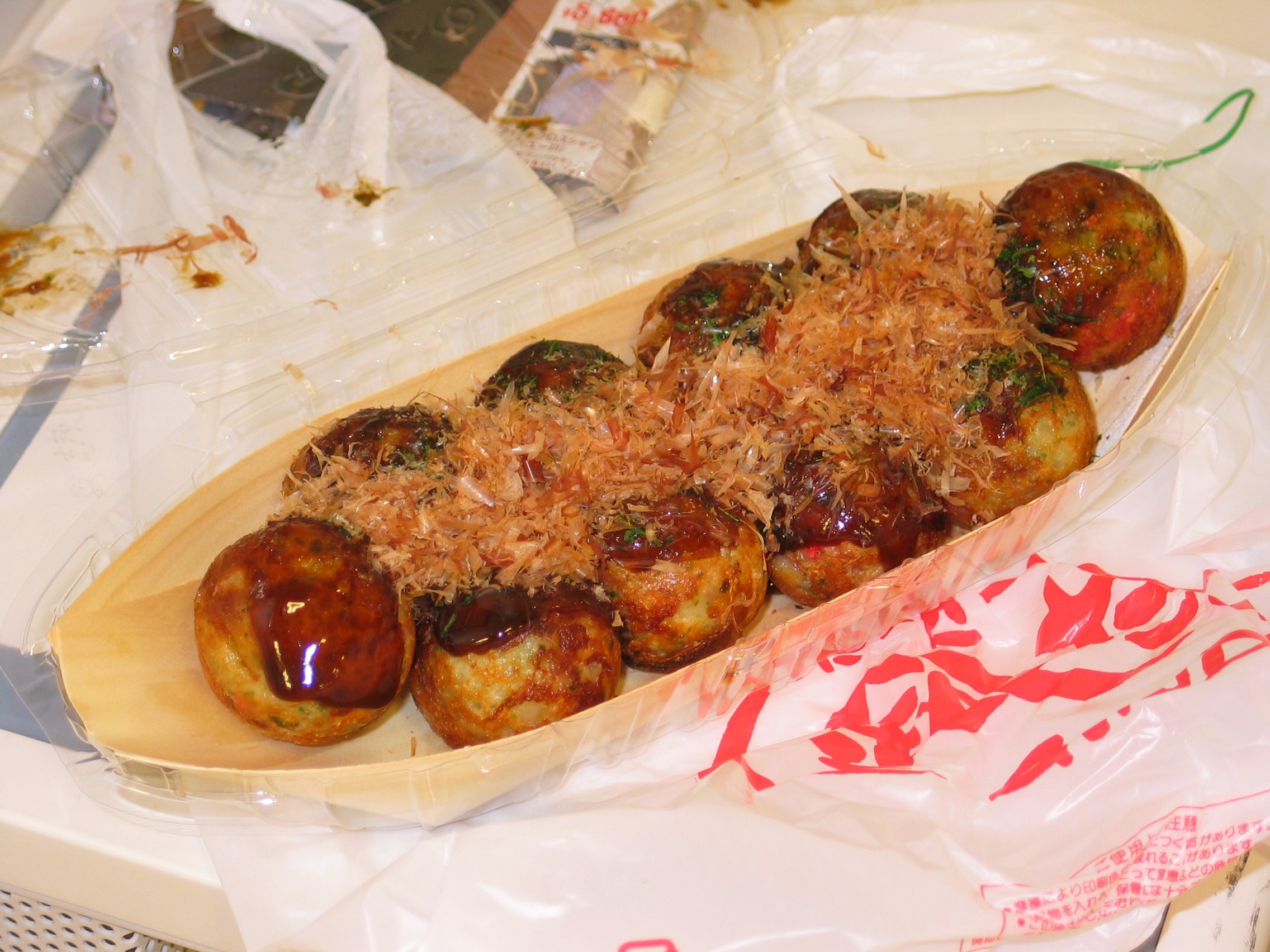
Takoyaki

brand

- Hello Panda
- Kappa Ebisen
- Koala's March
- Pocky – known as Mikado in Europe
- Pretz
- Yan Yan
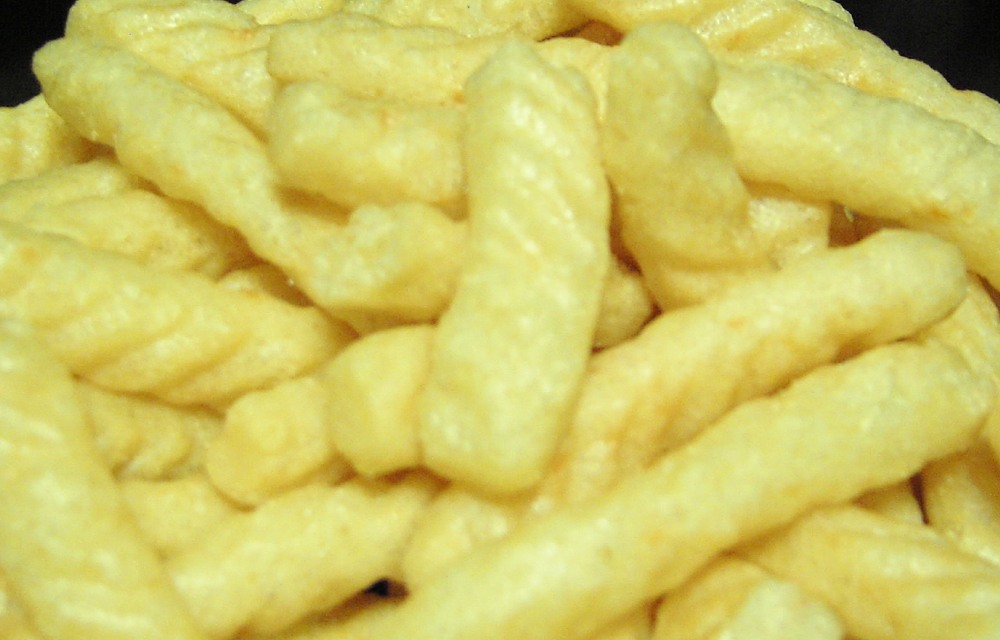
Kappa Ebisen

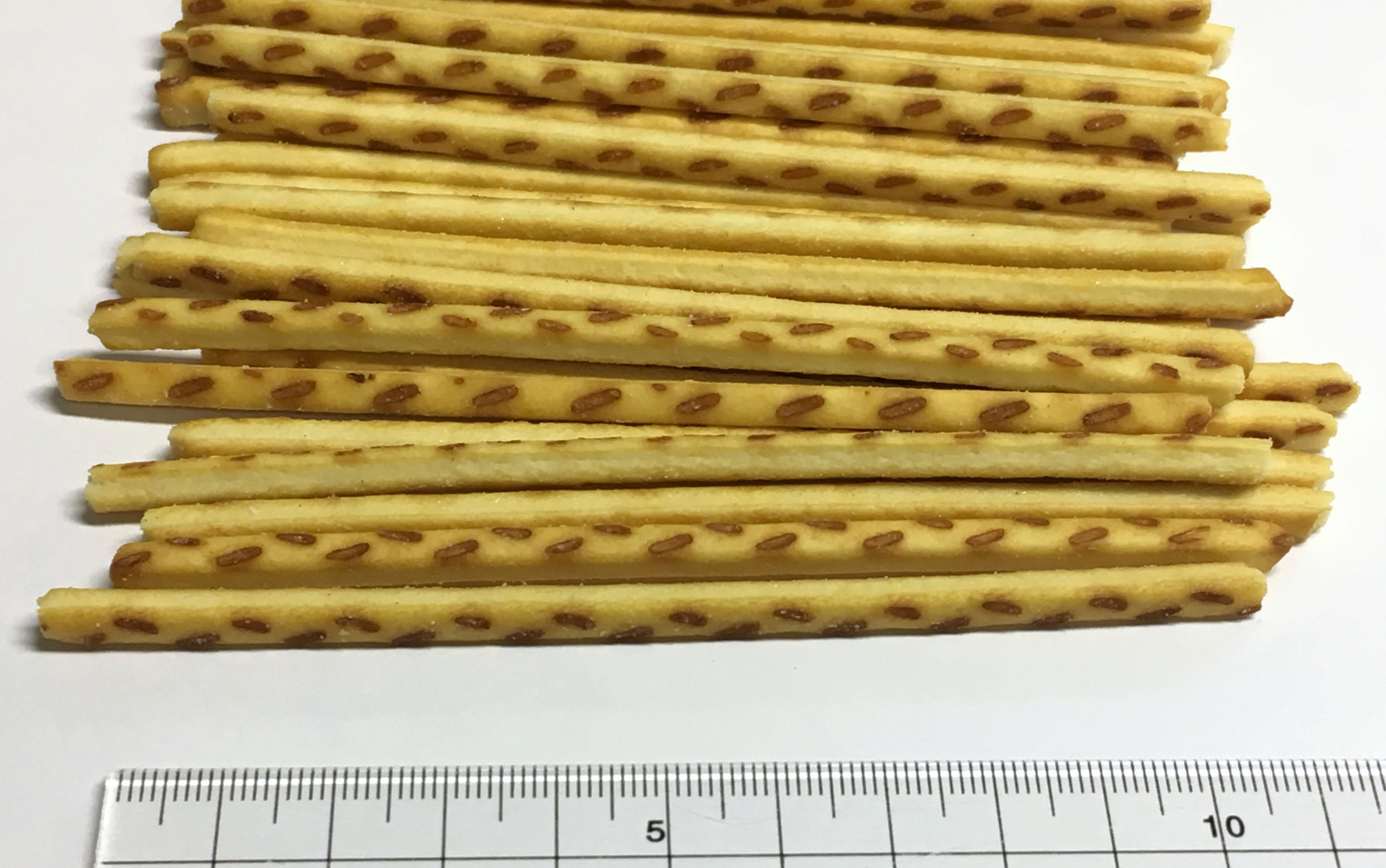
Pretz

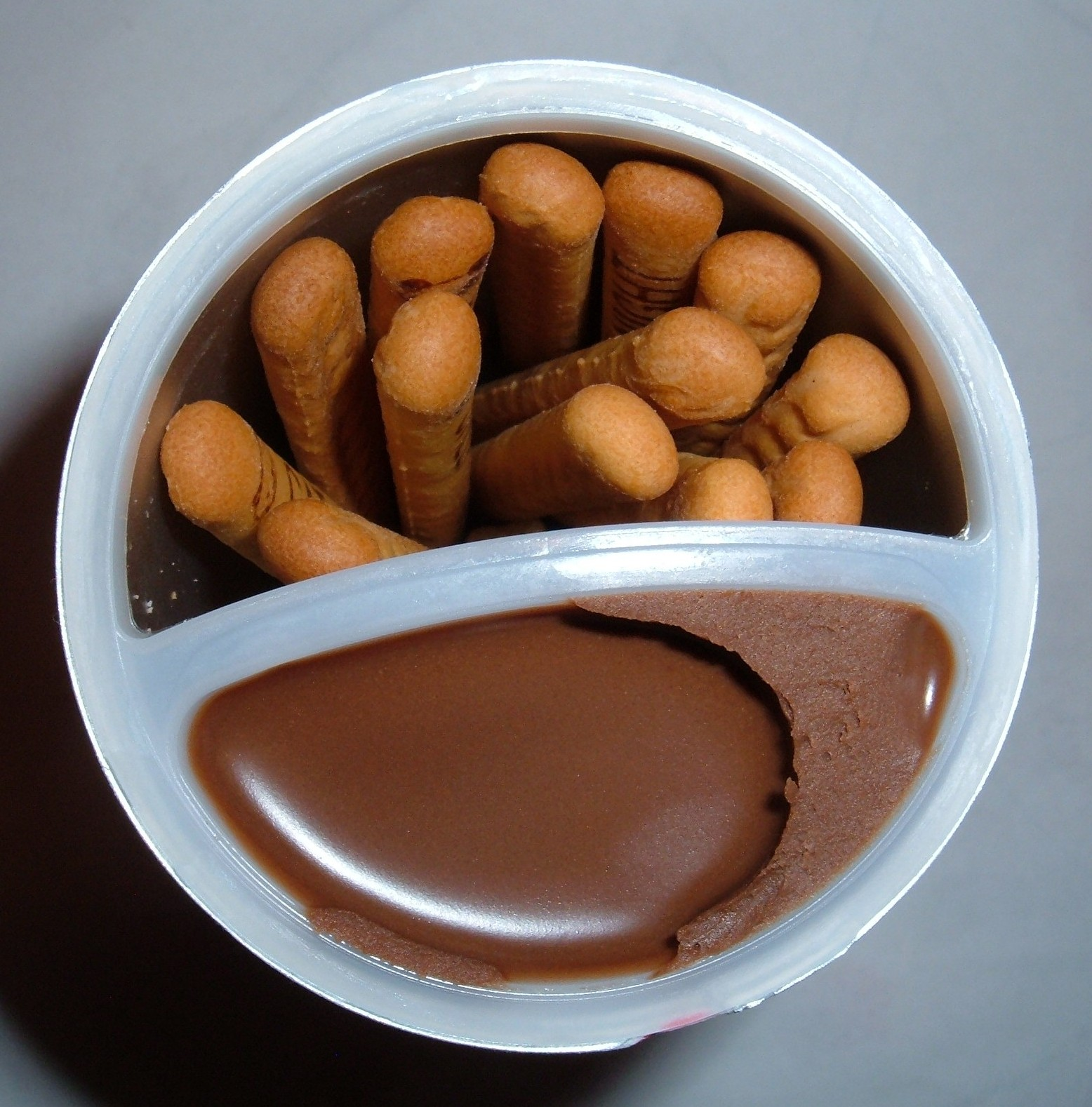
A package of regular Yan Yan

=== Cake ===
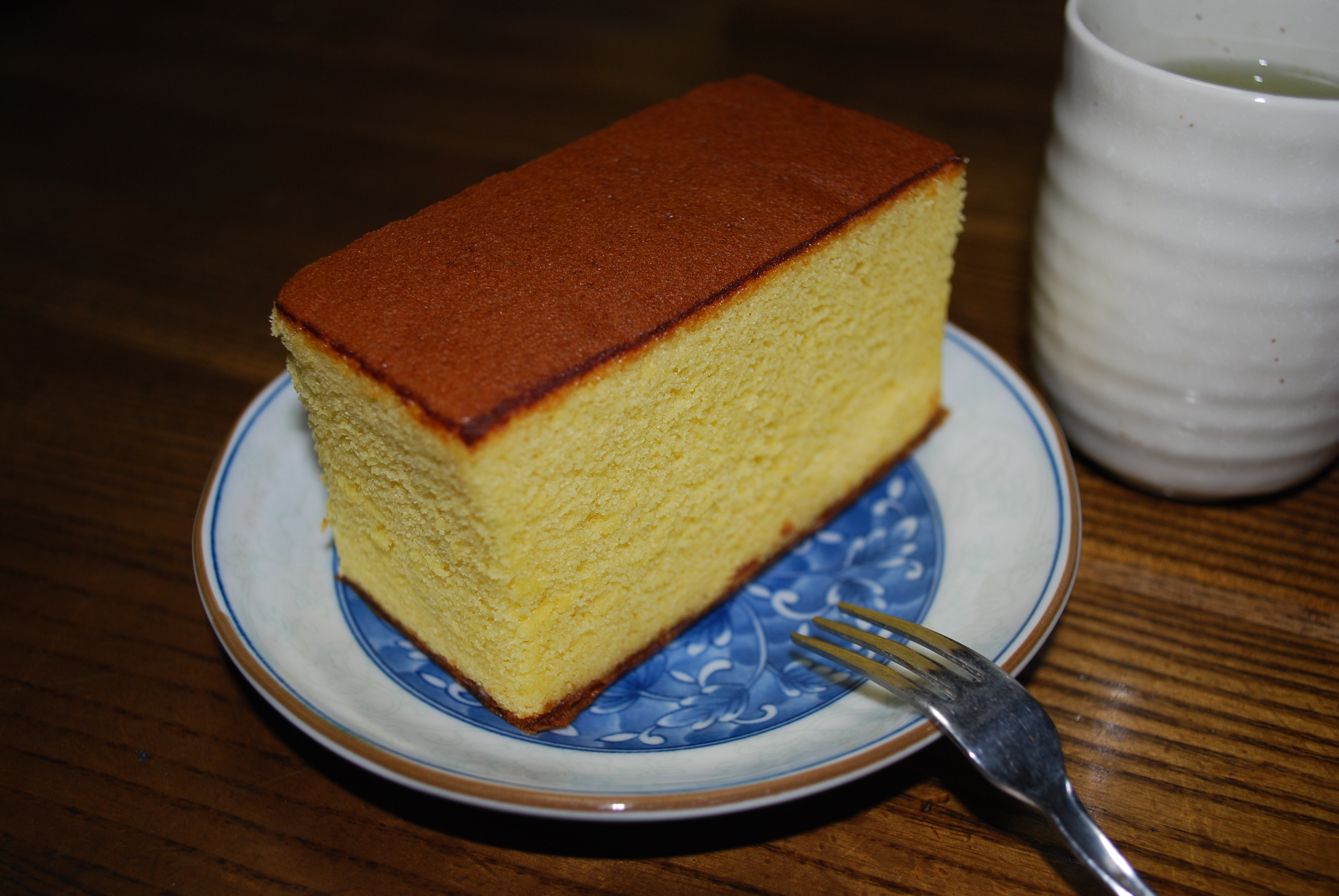
Castella fluffy cake

- Castella
- Siberia
- Tokyo Banana

=== Candy ===
generic

- Amezaiku - Japanese candy craft artistry
- Aruheitō
- Konpeitō
- Ramune candy - compressed tablet candy
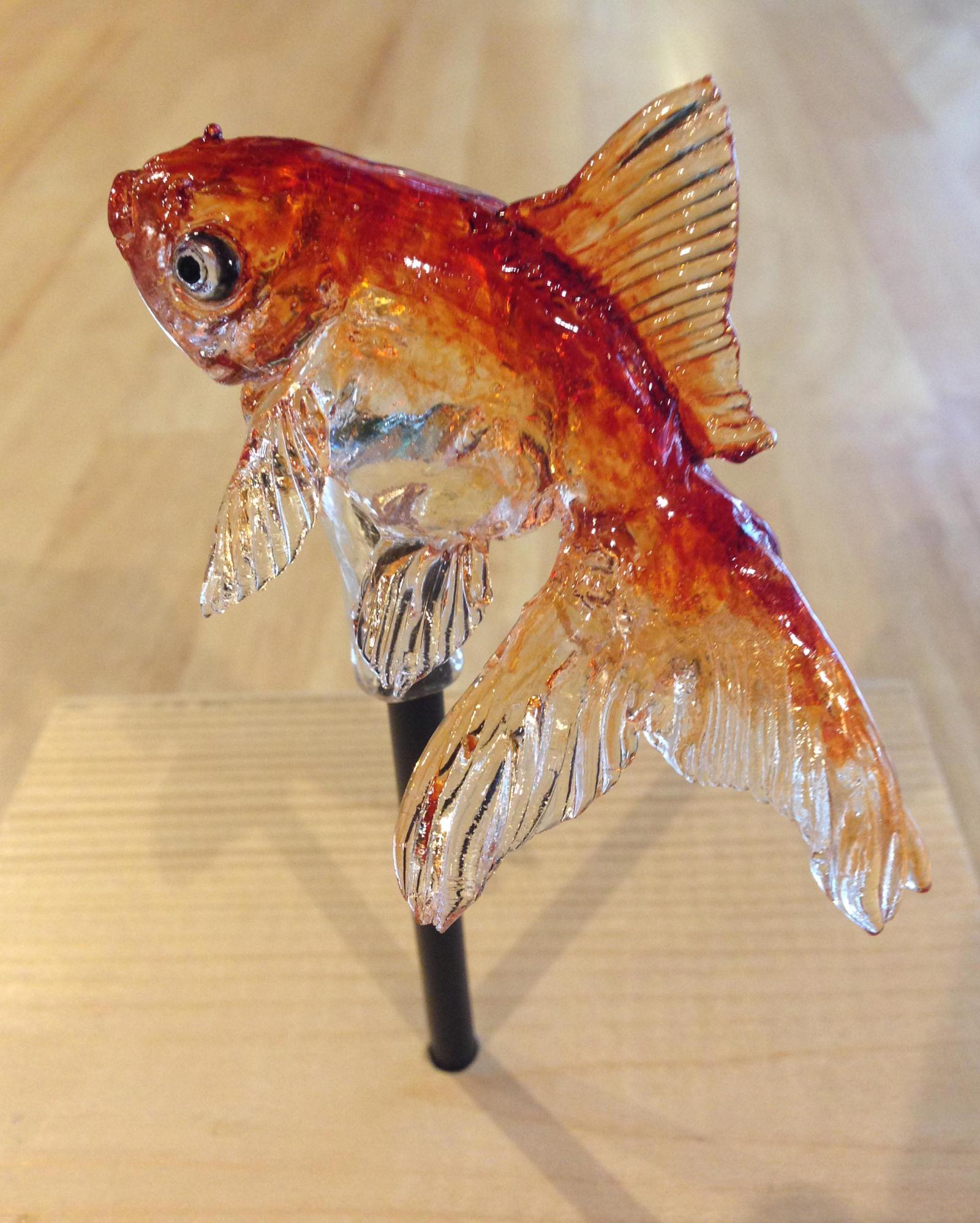
Amezaiku

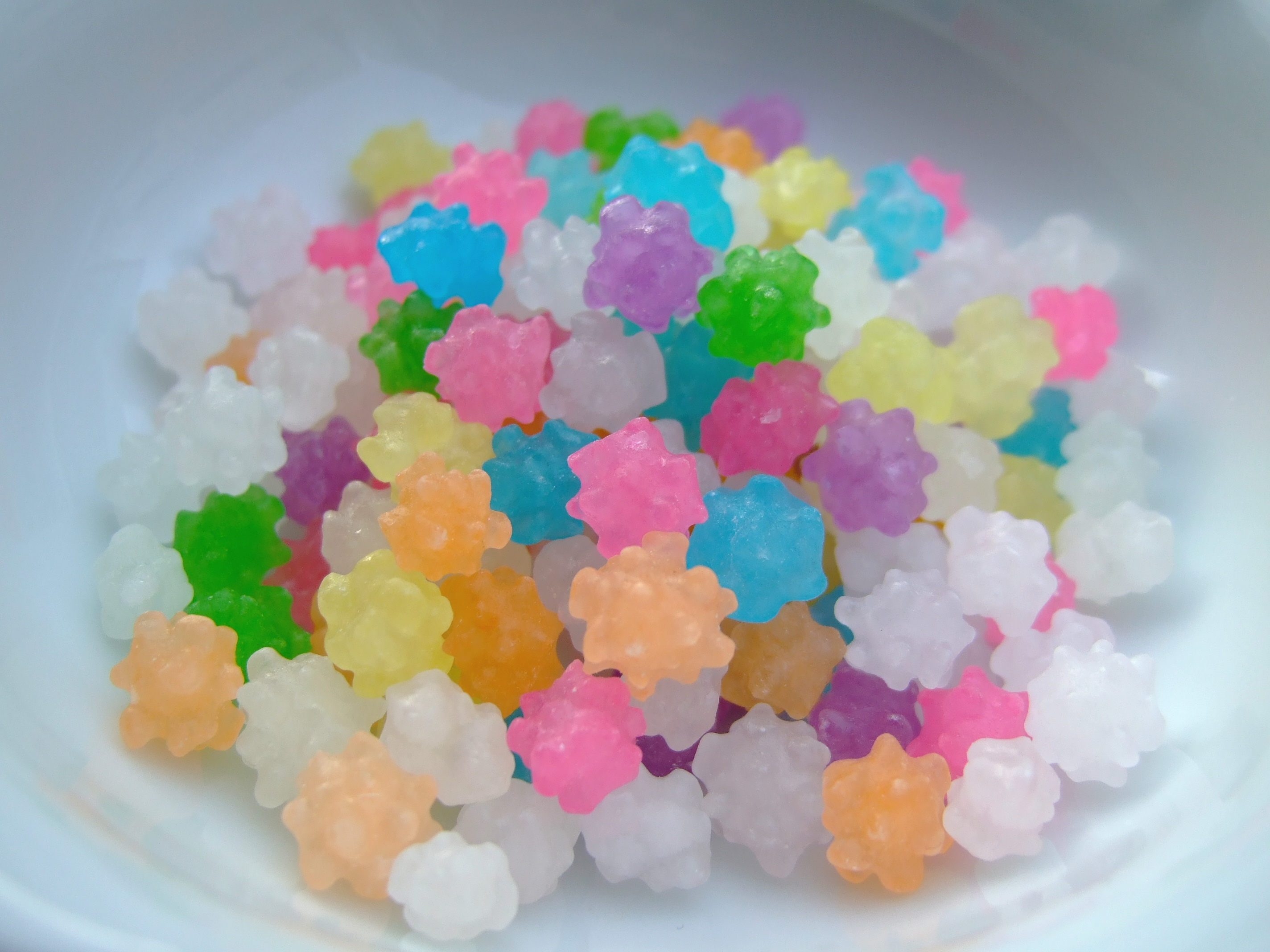
Konpeitō

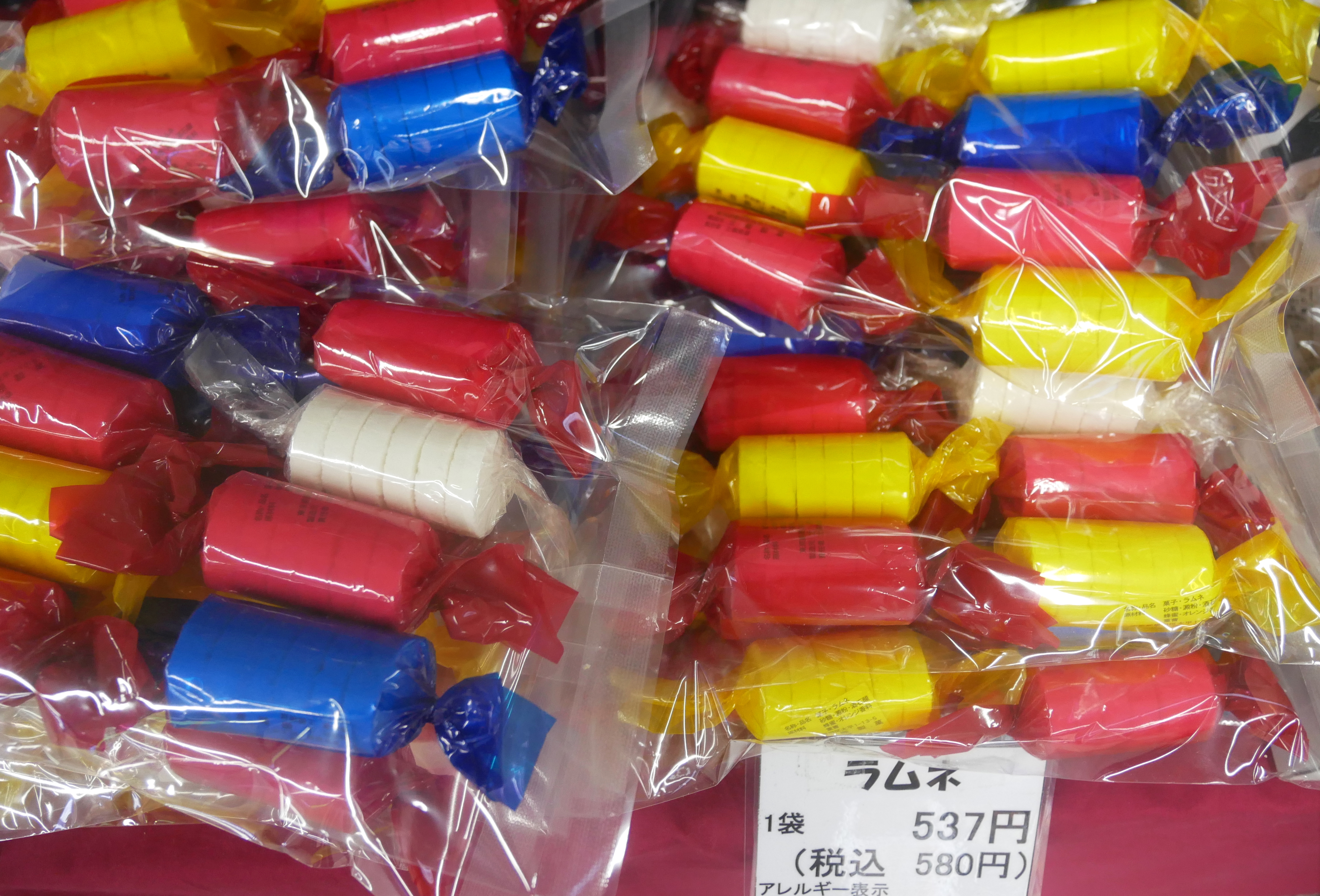
Ramune candy

brand

- Botan/Tomoe Ame
- Calpis Candy
- Chelsea (candy) – made by Meiji Confectionery in Japan
- Cubyrop
- gumi 100
- Hi-chew
- Milky (candy)
- Pinky
- Poifull
- Puccho
- Puré gumi candy - gummy candy with fruit purée made by KANRO Co., Ltd.
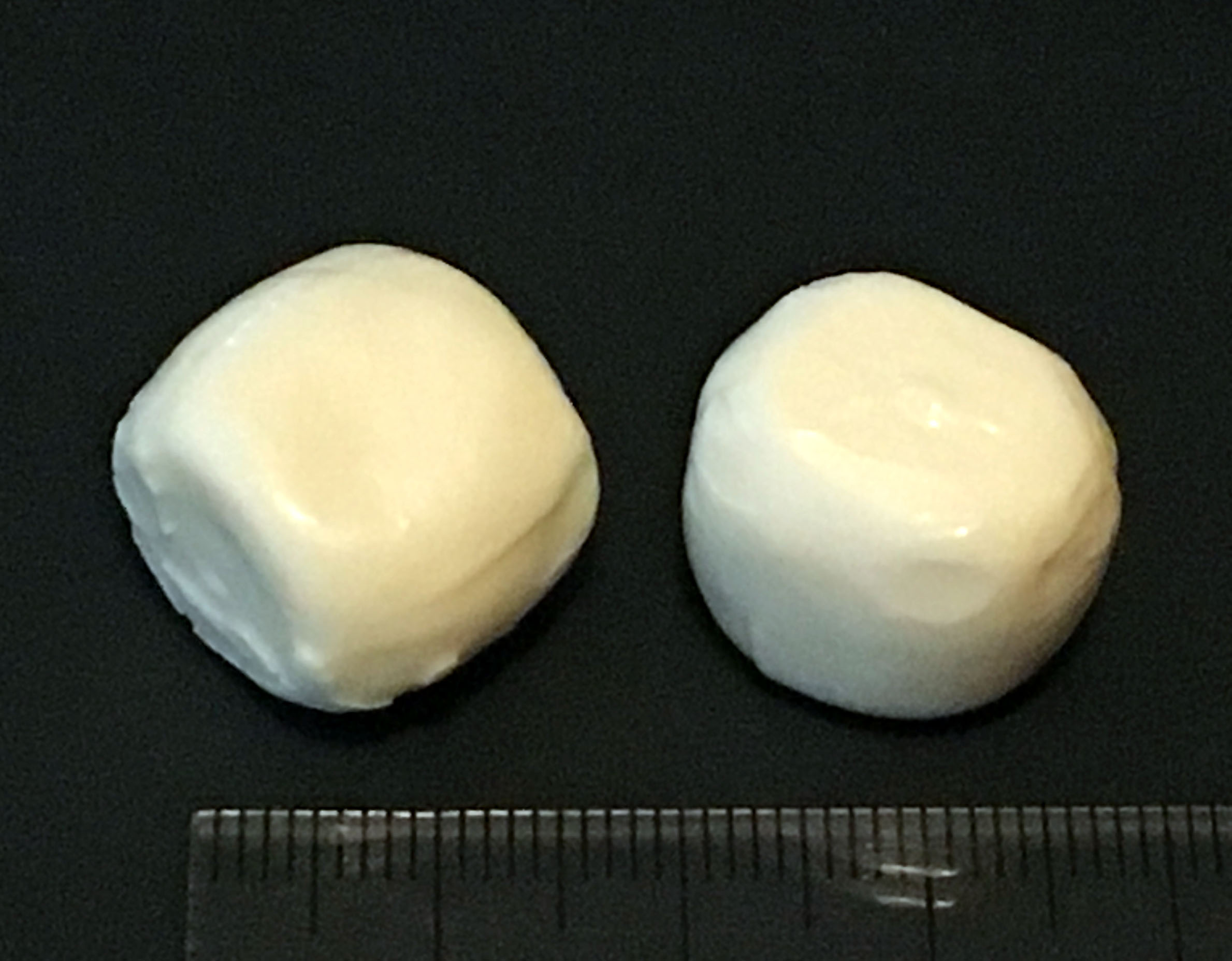
Milky (candy)

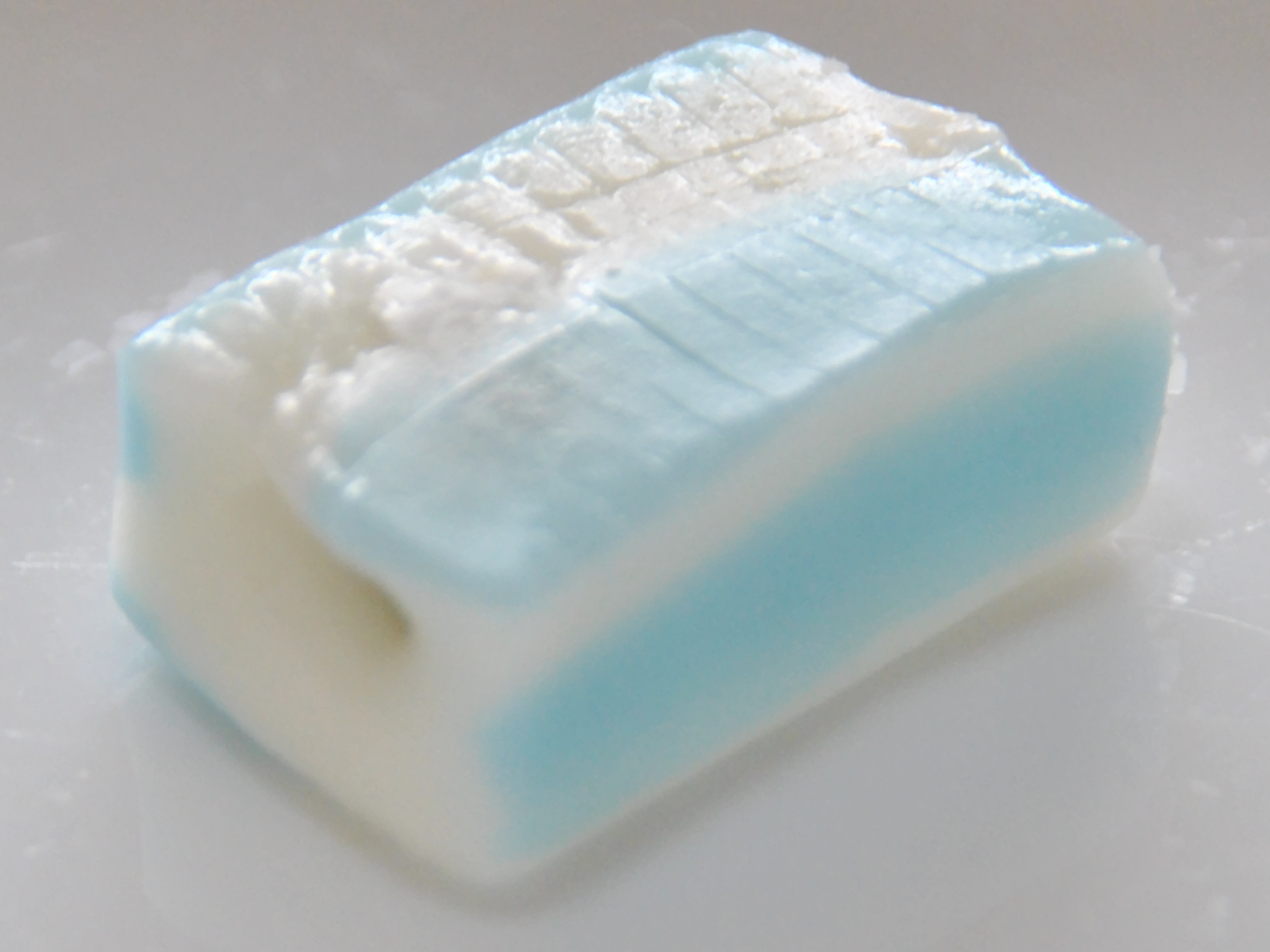
Puccho

=== Chewing gum ===
- Black Black
- Fuwarinka
- Kiss Mint and Watering Kissmint
- Let's
- Plus X
- Poscam
- Pure White
- Sweetie
- whatta – chewing gum by Meiji Confectionery
- Xylish
- Yuzu

=== Corn ===
- Curl (Japanese snack)
- Kyabetsu Taro

=== Chocolate ===
generic

- Matcha chocolate - chocolate containing matcha

brand

- Apollo (chocolate) - chocolate in shape of Apollo command module
- Choco Baby
- Choco Ball
- Crunky
- Crunky kids
- DARS (chocolate)
- E-Royce'
- Every Burger
- Kinoko no yama - known as CHOCOROOMS in US
- Koara no māchi
- Ghana
- Pocky – known as Mikado in Europe
- Pucca Chocolate
- Takenoko no sato - known as CHOCOCONES in US
- Toppo
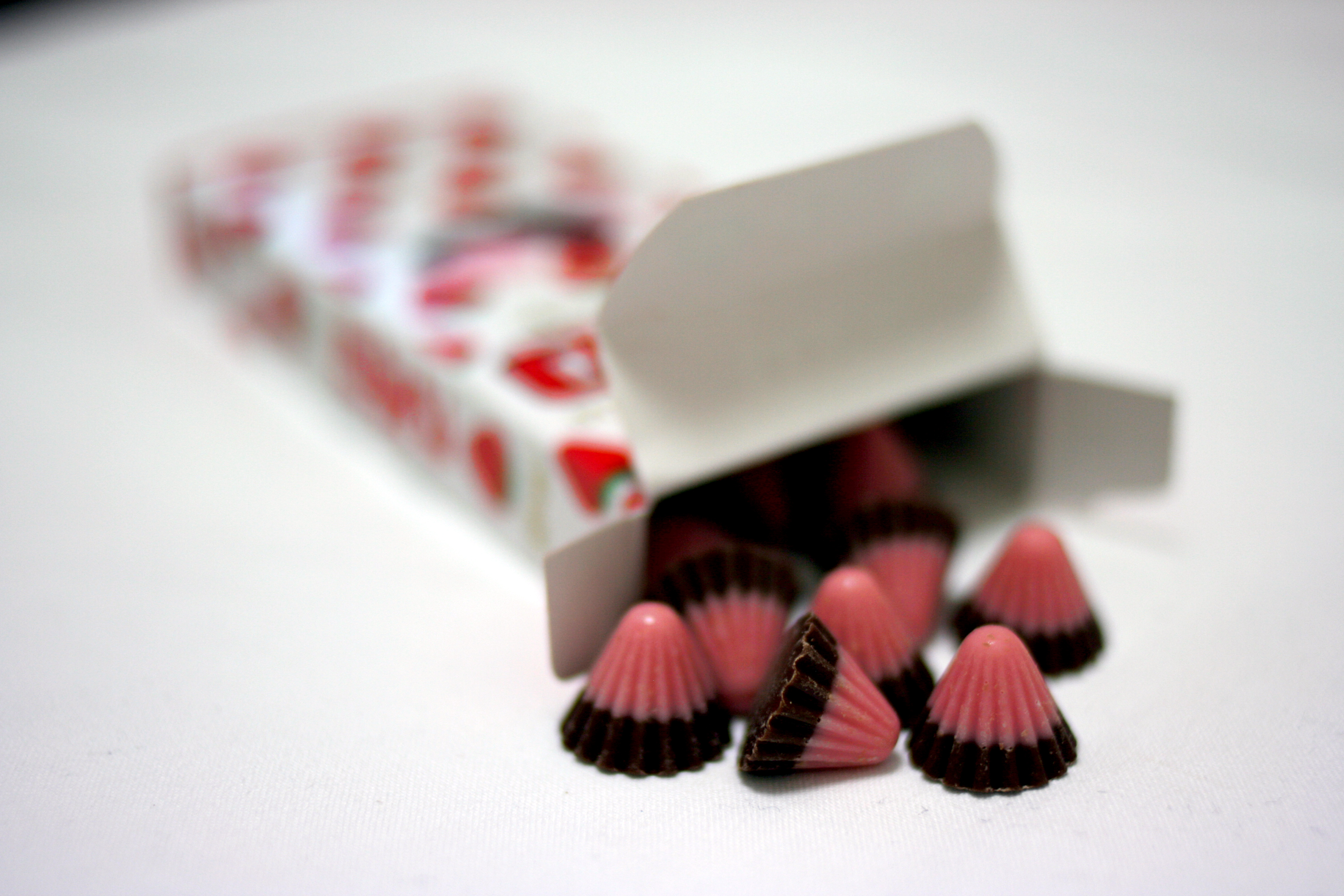
Apollo (chocolate)

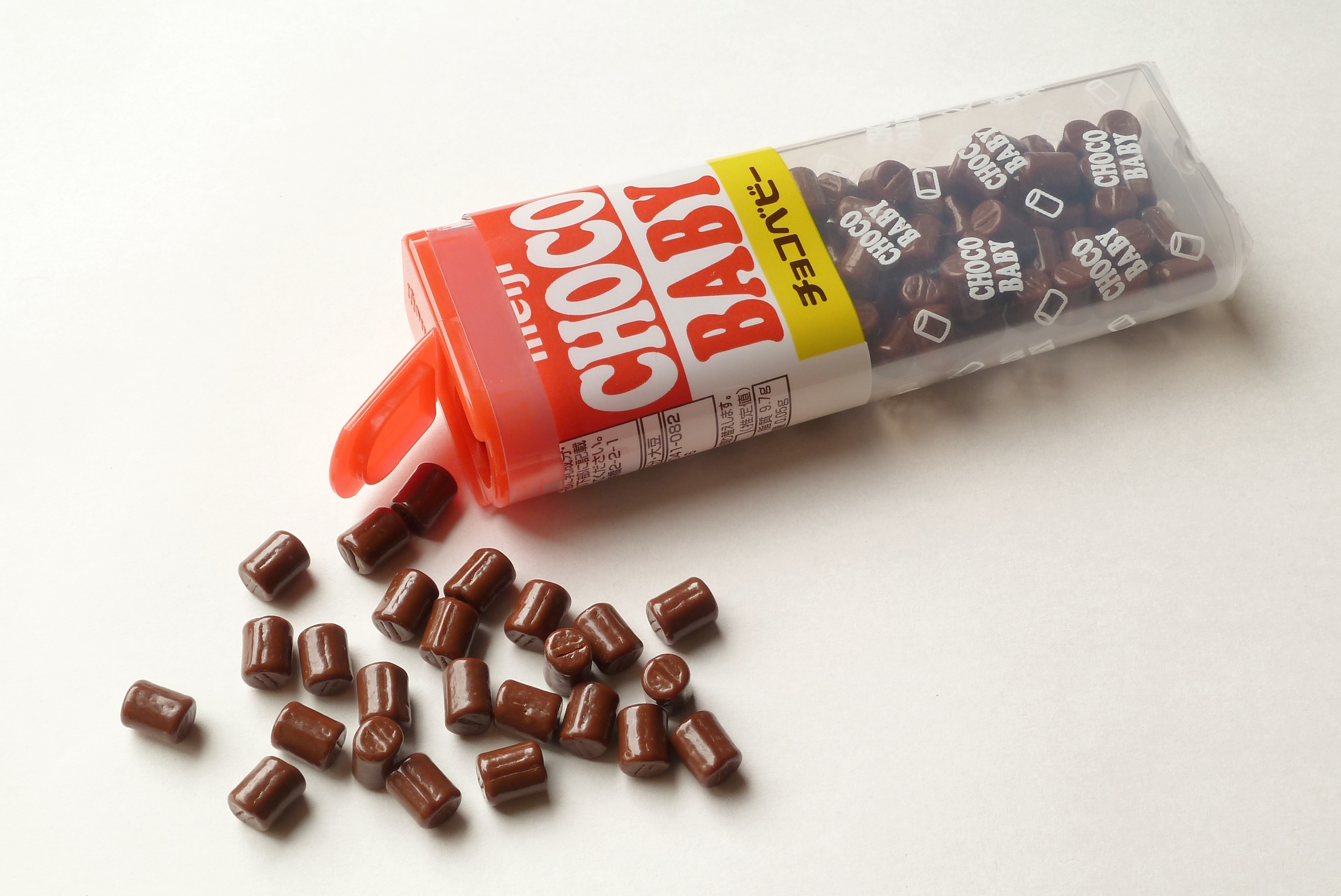
Choco Baby

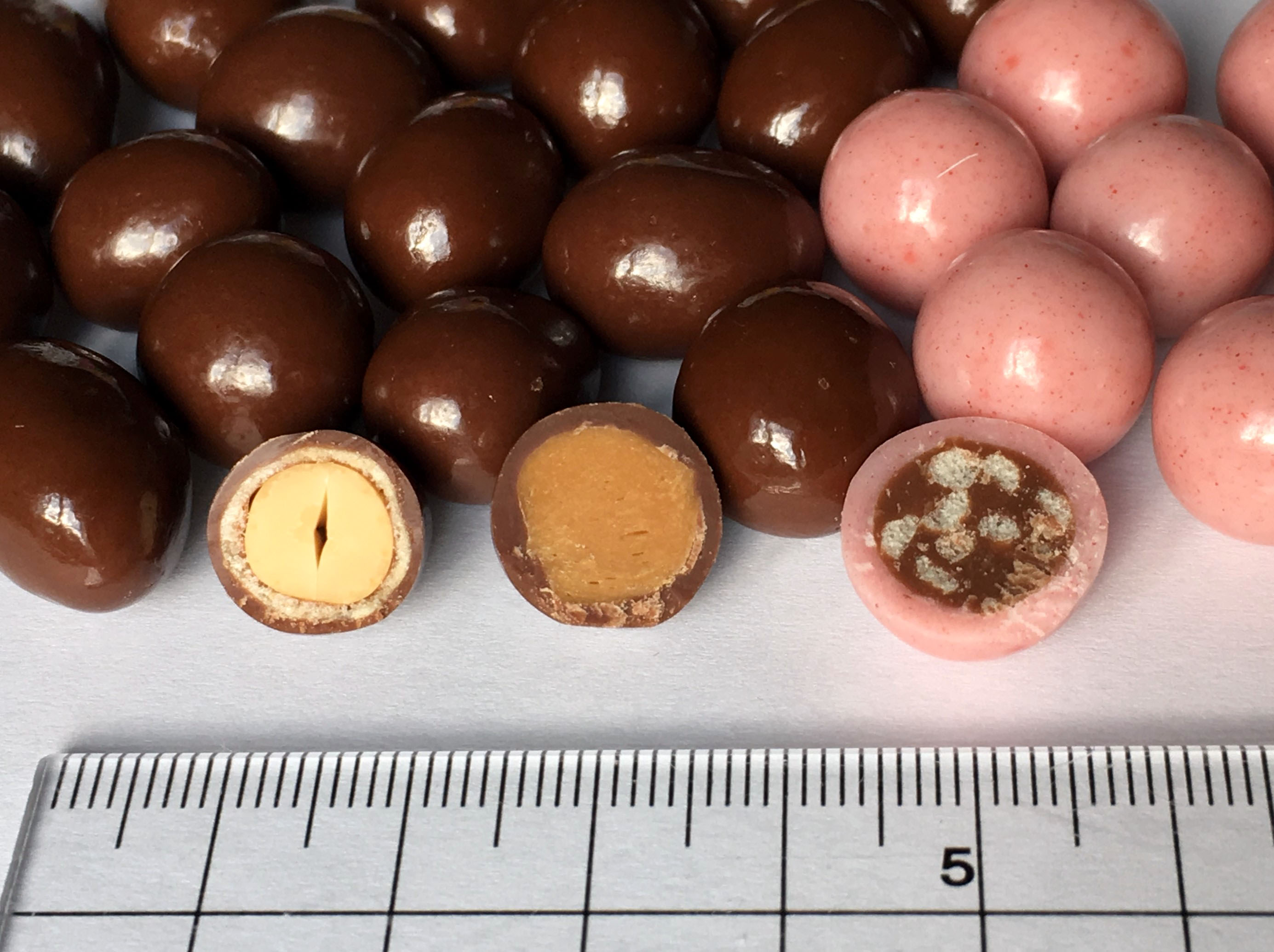
Choco Ball

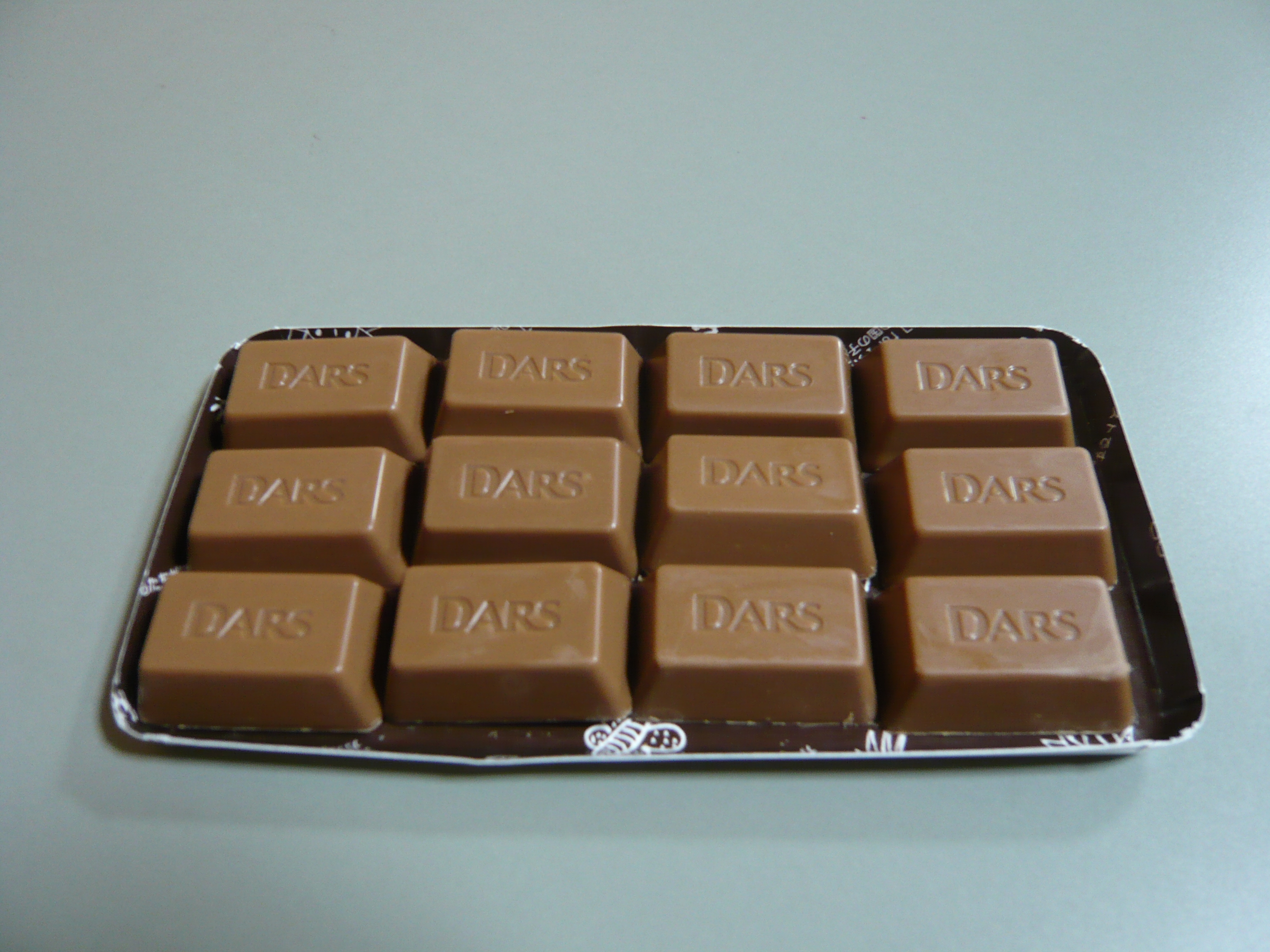
DARS (chocolate)

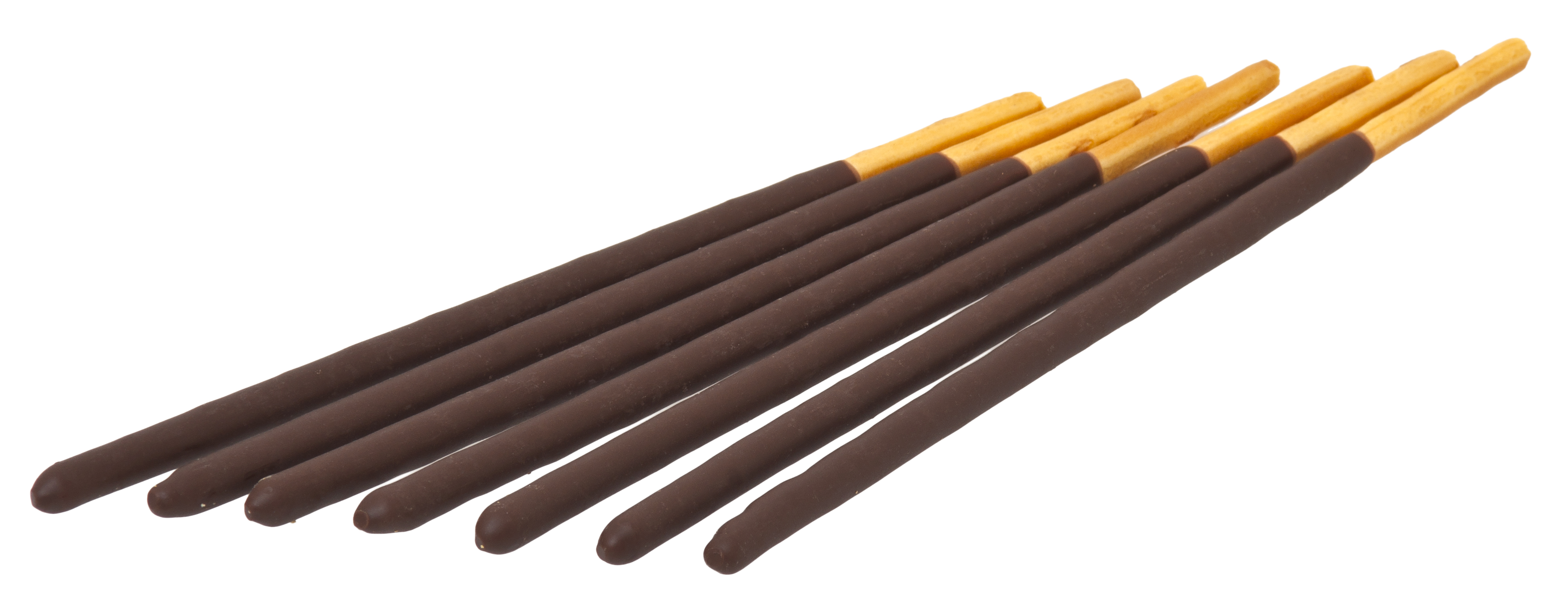
Pocky

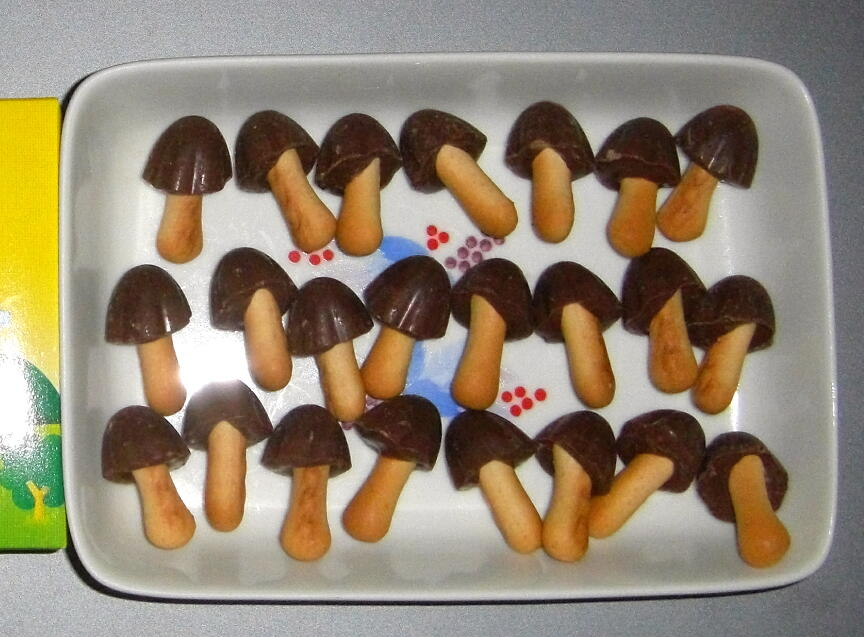
Kinoko no yama

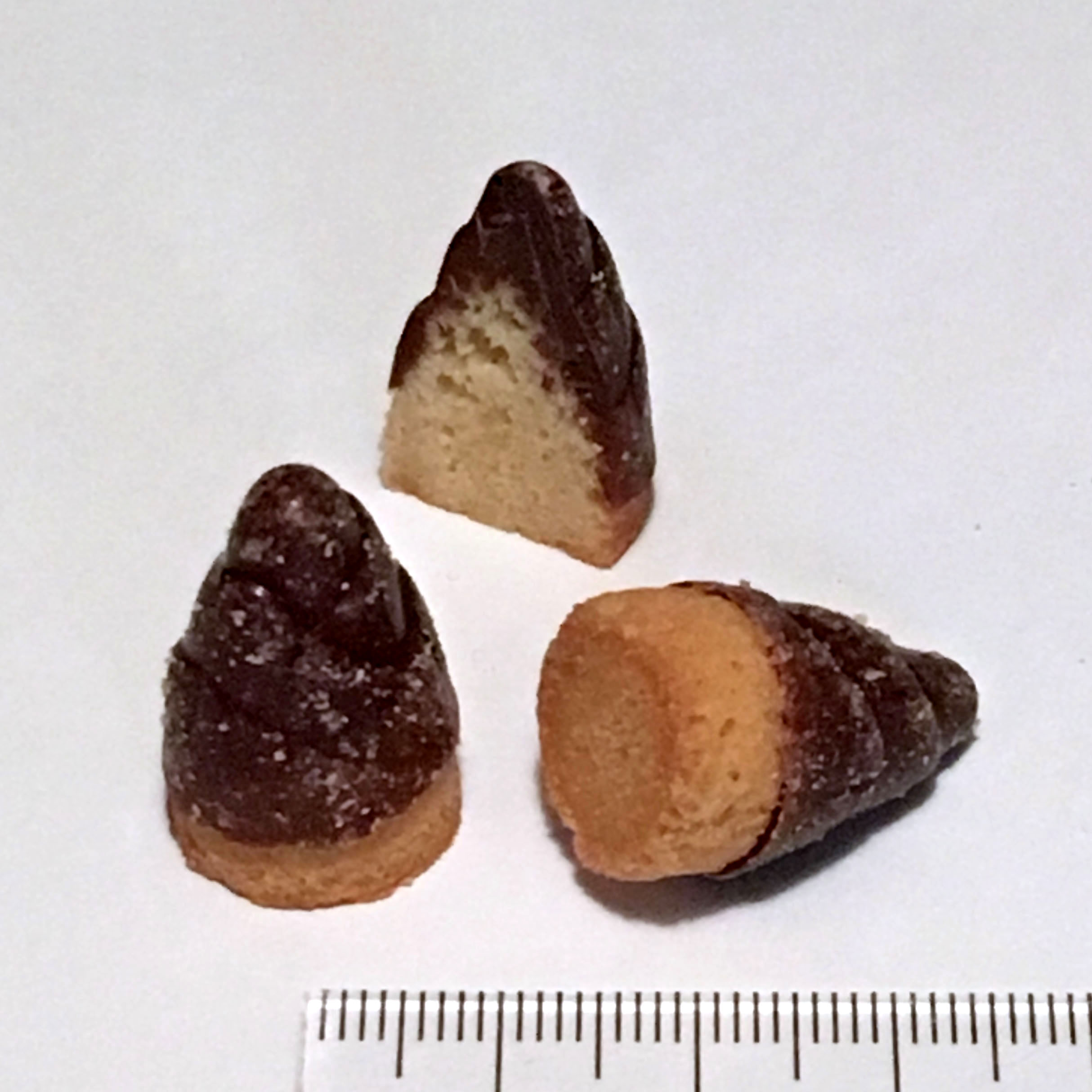
Takenoko no sato

=== Ice cream & shaved ice ===
generic

- Green tea ice cream
- Kakigōri
- Mochi ice cream
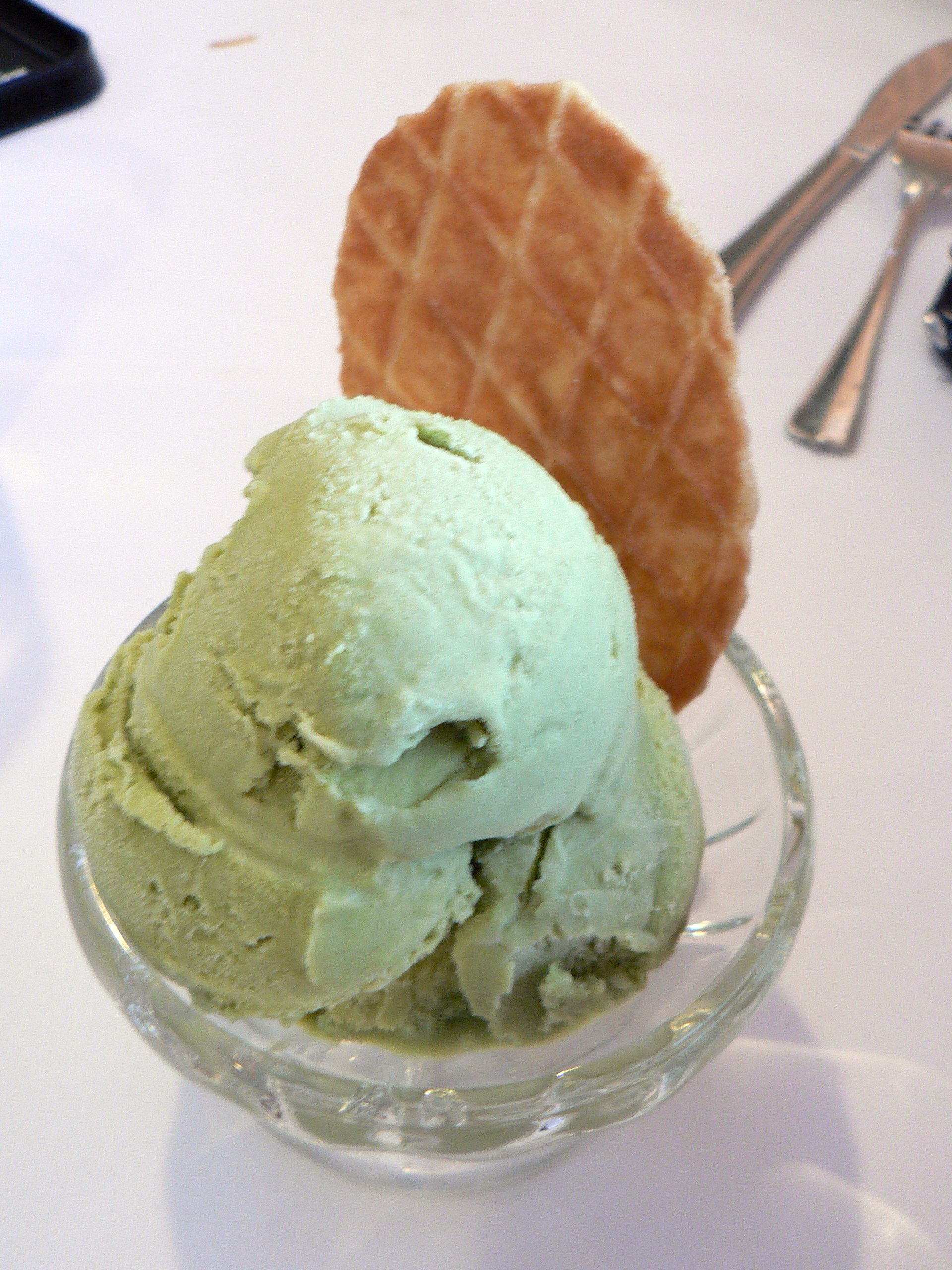
Green tea ice cream

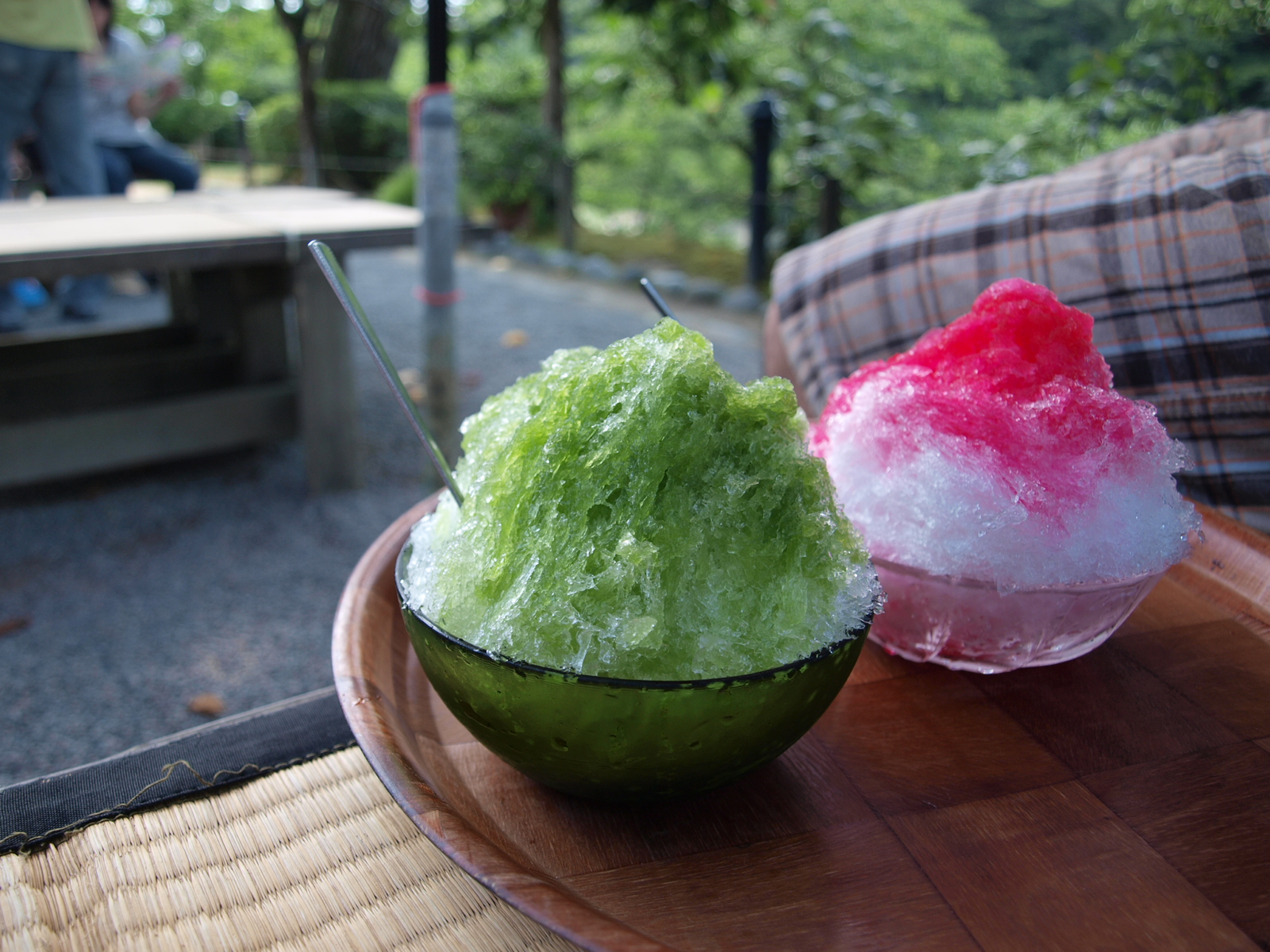
Green tea kakigōri (left) and strawberry flavoured kakigōri (right)

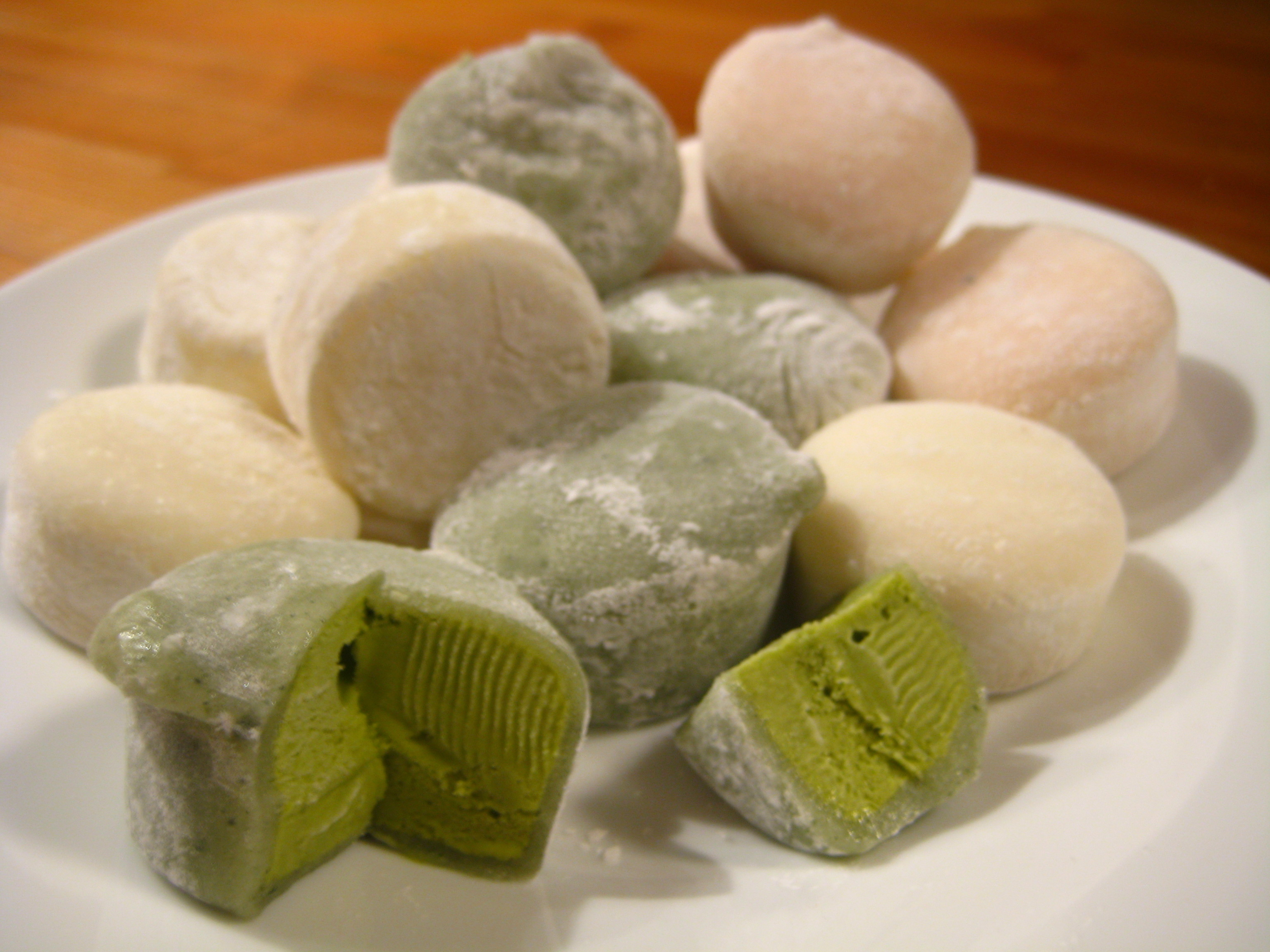
Mochi ice cream

brand

- Choco Monaka Jumbo, manufactured by Morinaga & Company.
- Panapp
- Yukimi Daifuku
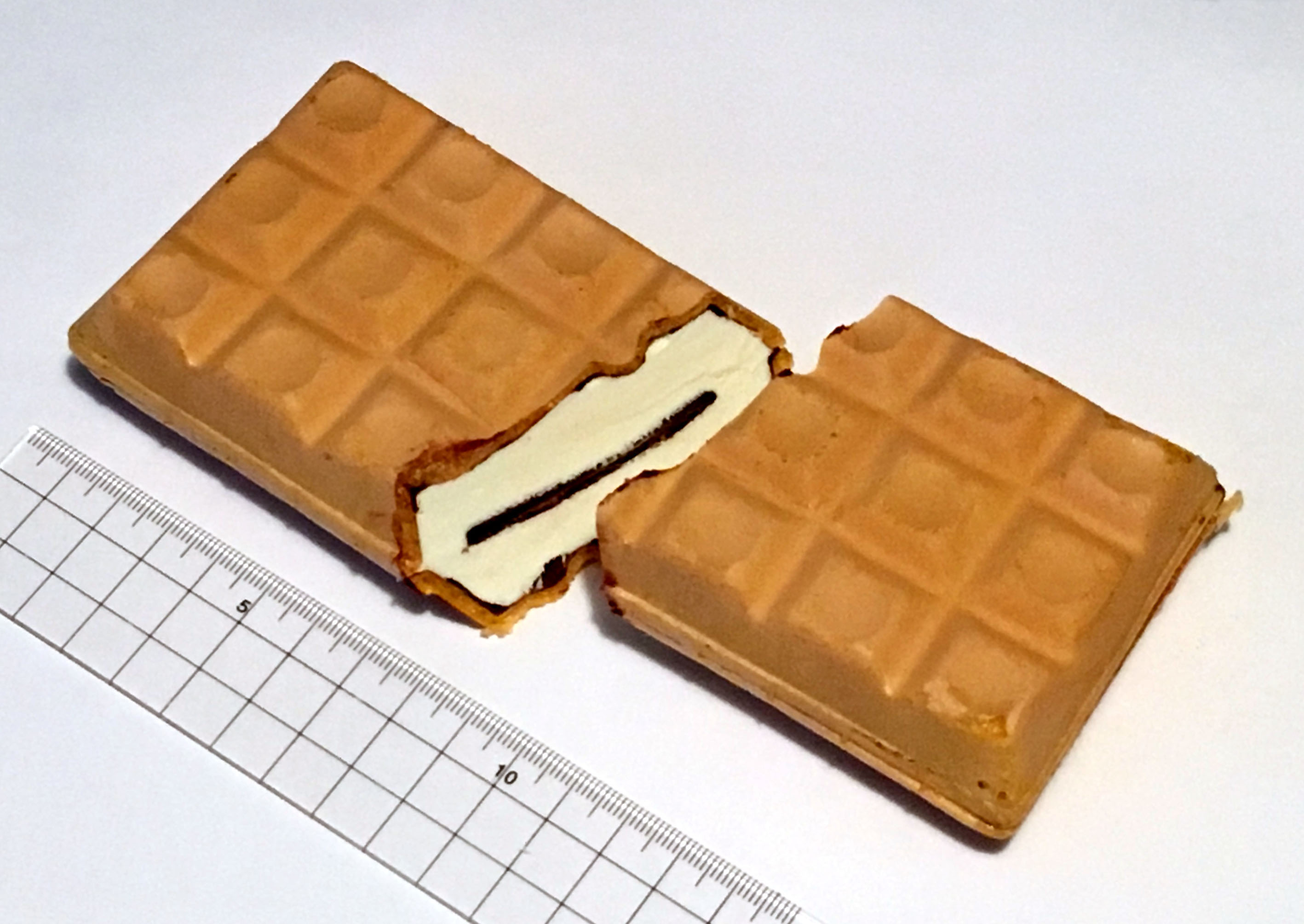
Choco Monaka Jumbo

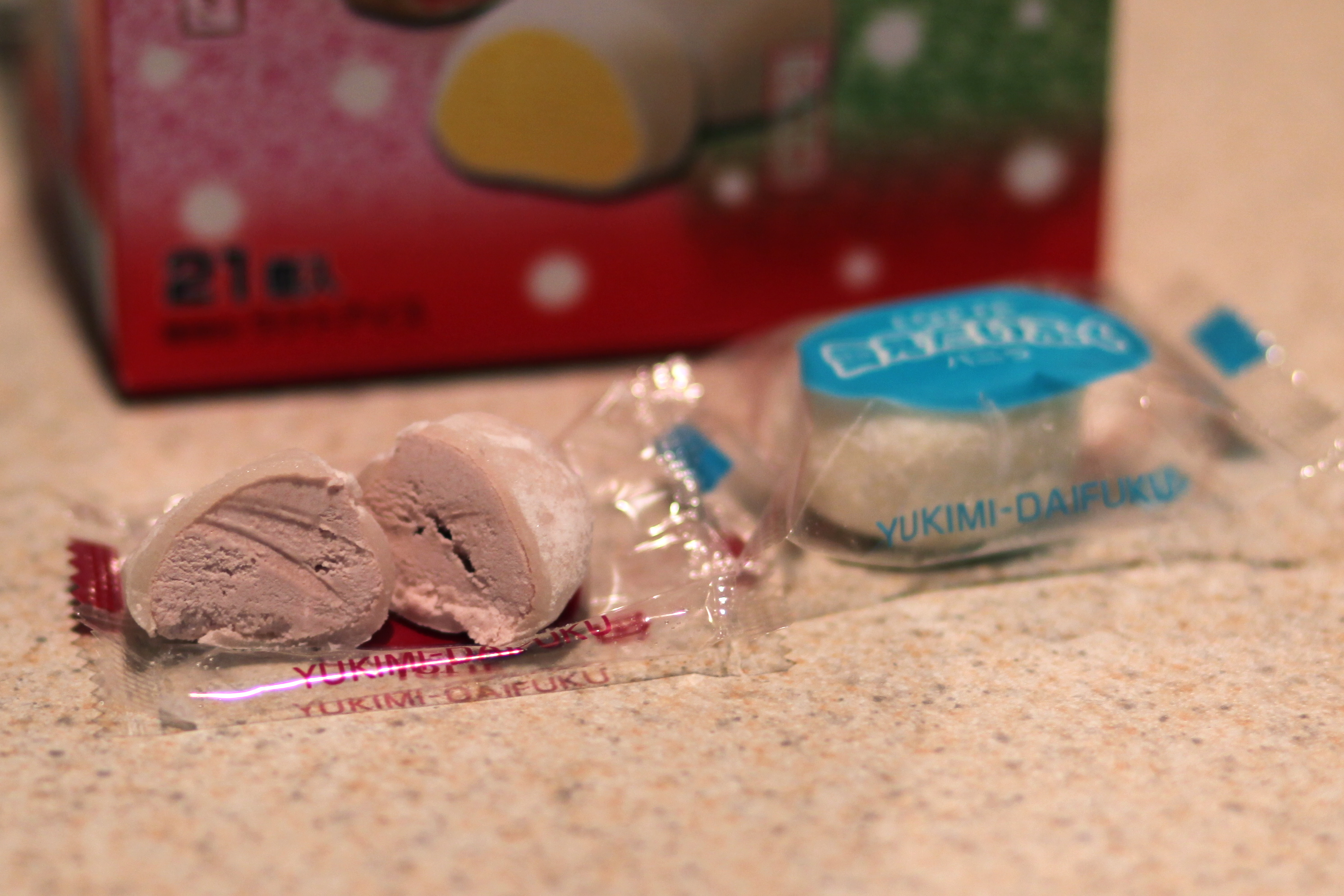
Yukimi Daifuku

=== Potato ===
generic

- Ishiyakiimo - roasted sweet potato
- Kenpi
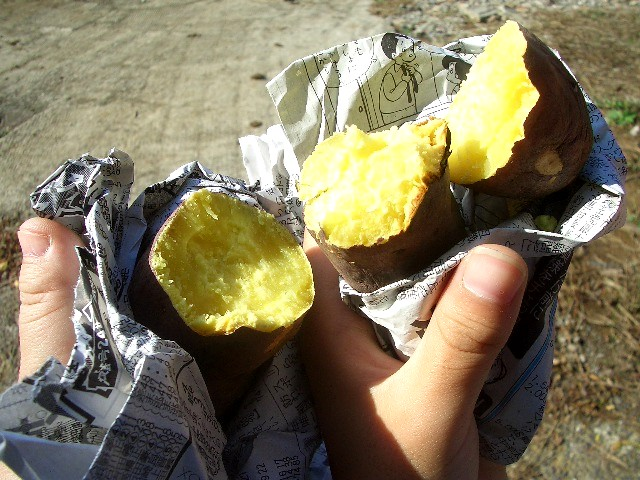
Ishiyakiimo

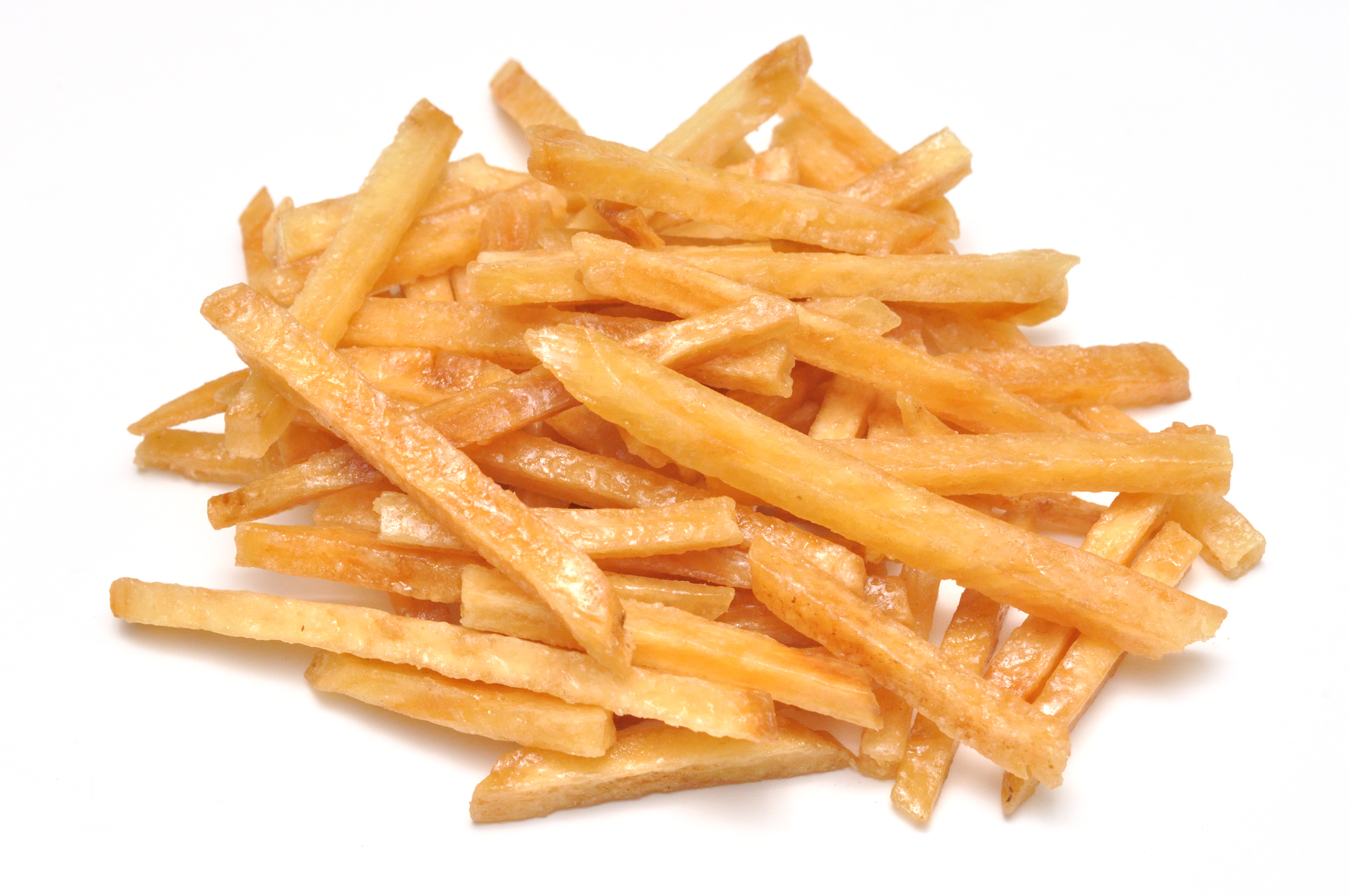
Kenpi

brand

- Bōkun Habanero
- Jagarico, manufactured by Calbee.
- Kara Mucho and Suppa Mucho
- Kataage Potato
- Pote Long, manufactured by Morinaga & Company.
- Wasabeef - wasabi & beef flavoured potato chips
- Ototo - potato snack in shape of seafood.
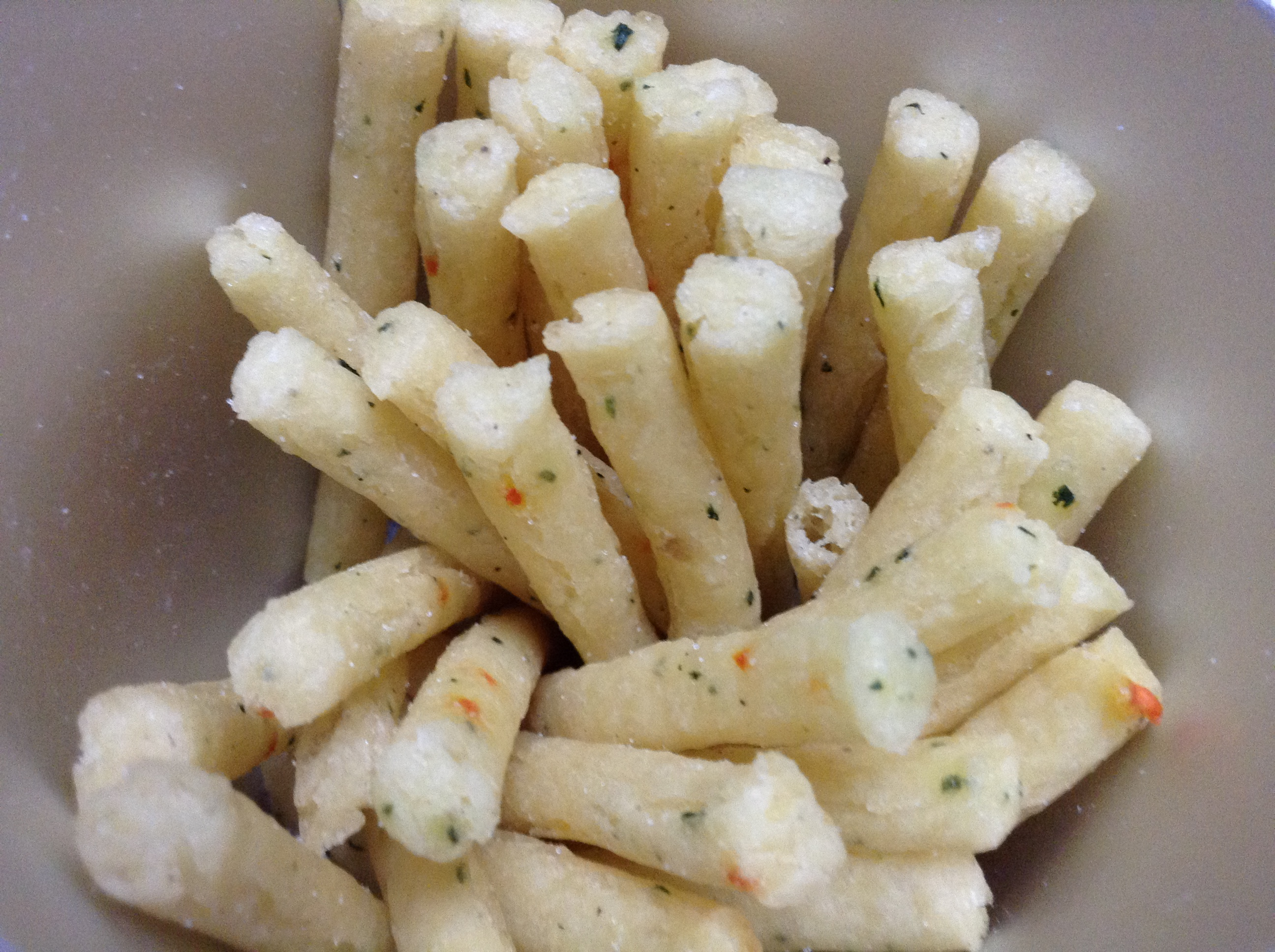
Jagarico

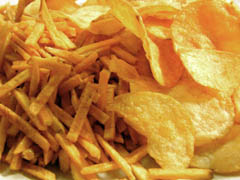
Kara Mucho

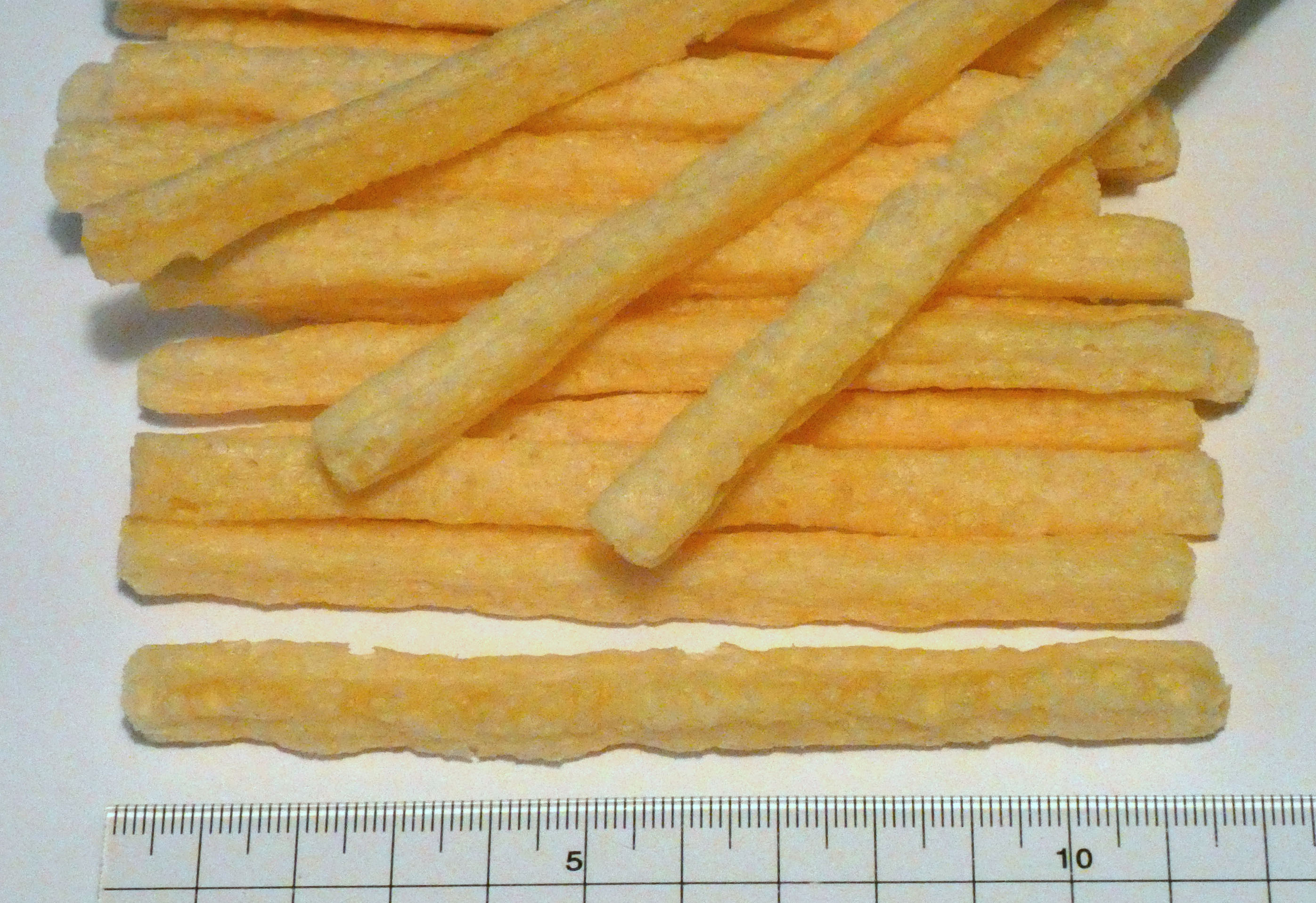
Pote Long

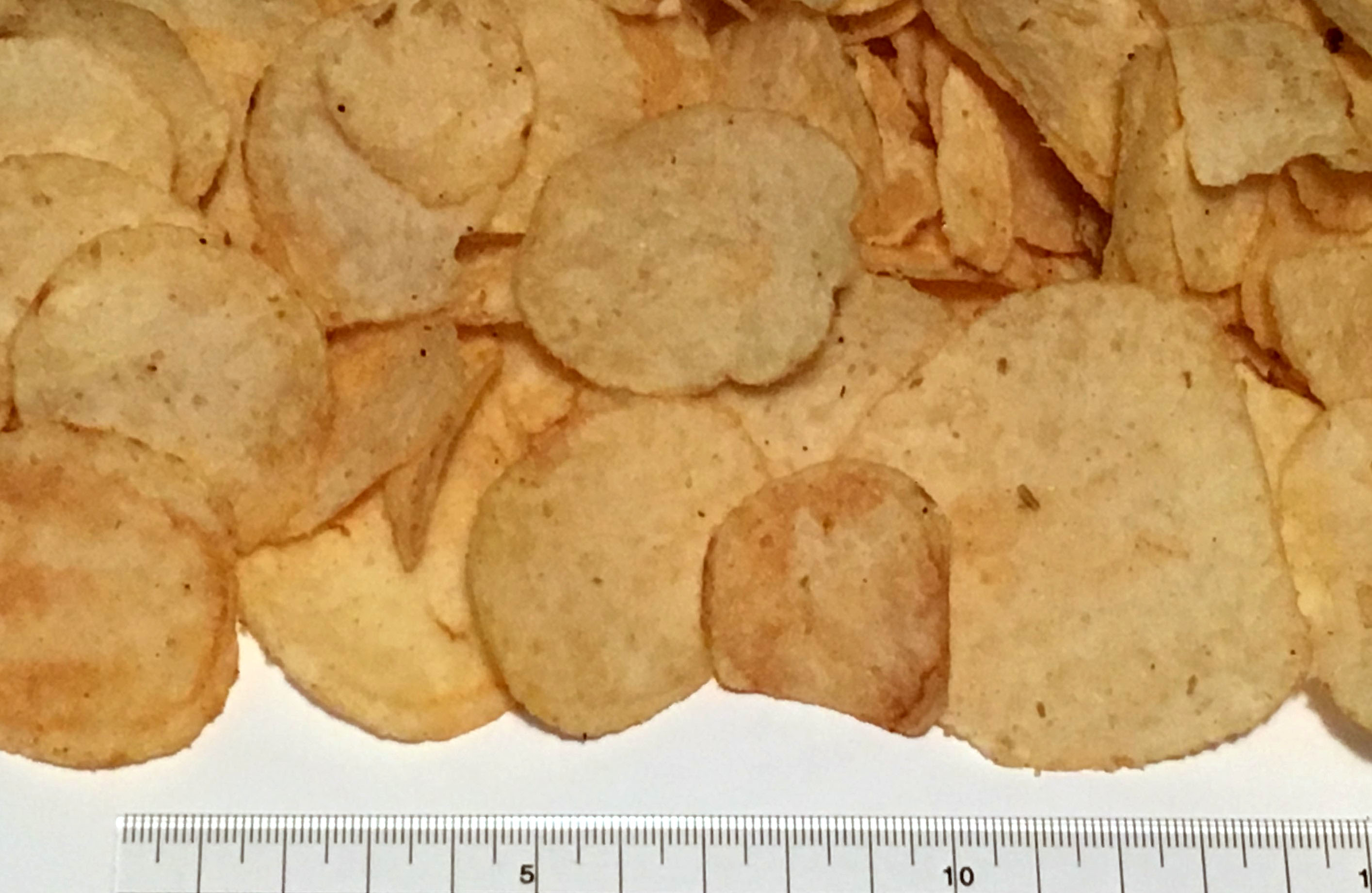
Wasabeef

=== Rice ===
generic

- Onigiri, or rice ball can be eaten both as a snack and as a meal, by modern Japanese people. In Sengoku period, samurai ate large rice balls as a field ration during the war.
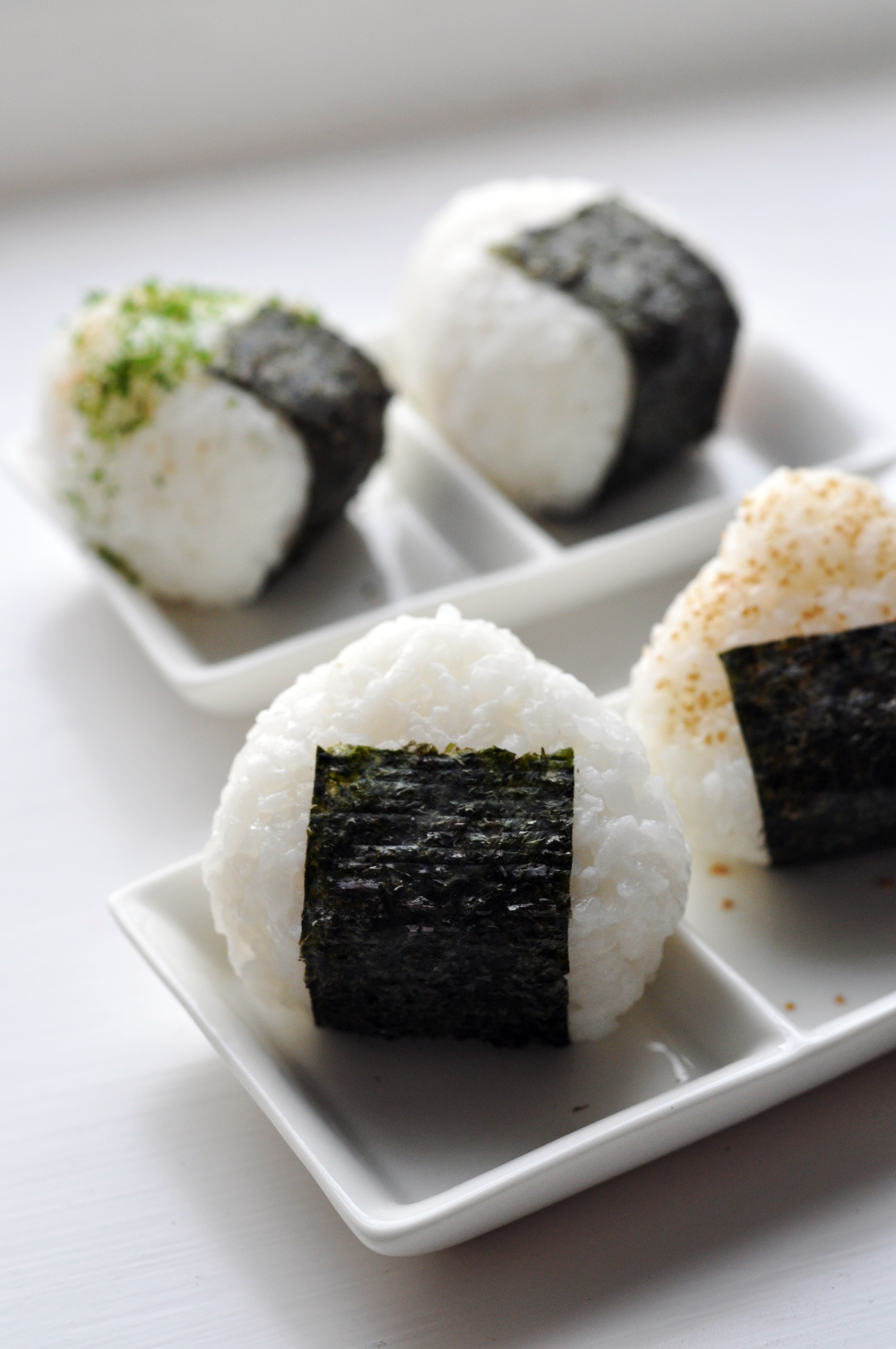
Small onigiris convenient for snacks

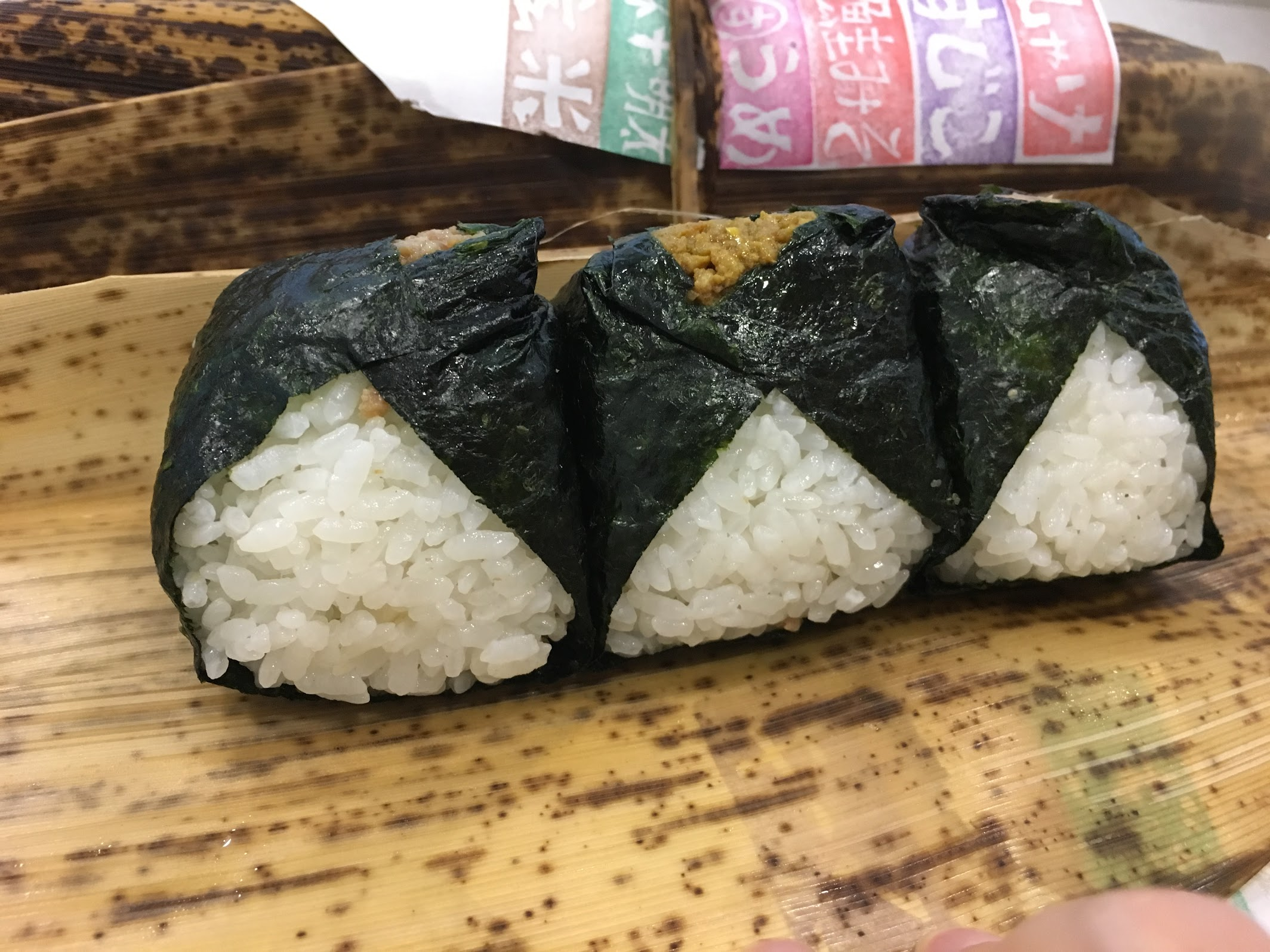
In Sengoku period and Edo period, onigiris were often wrapped in bamboo skin when they were carried. Bamboo skin has an antibacterial effect and keeps rice balls longer.

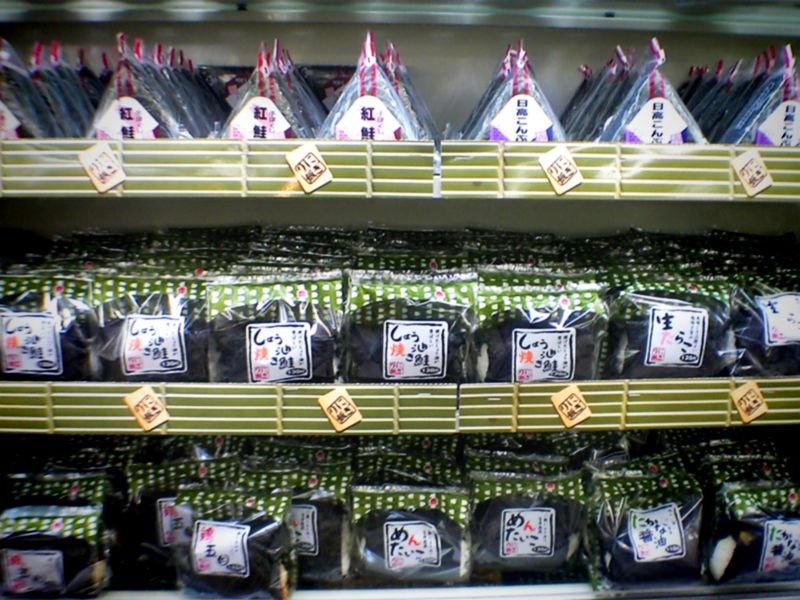
Modern onigiris wrapped in a small, transparent plastic bag

Rice based snacks are known as beika (米菓).

- Agemochi
- Arare
- Botamochi
- Daifuku
- Dango
- Kaki no tane
- Kaminari okoshi
- Kusa mochi
- Mochi
- Senbei
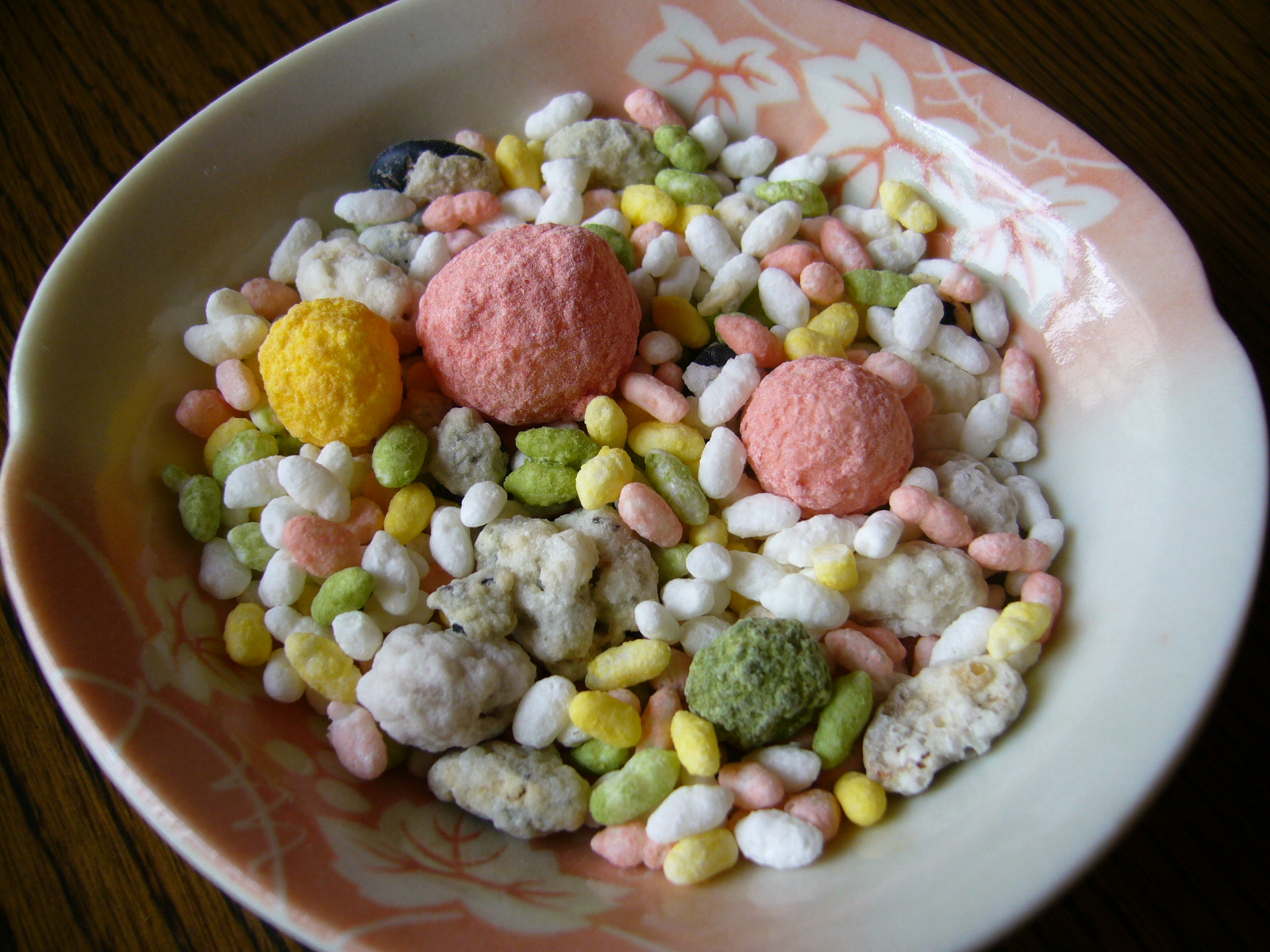
Arare

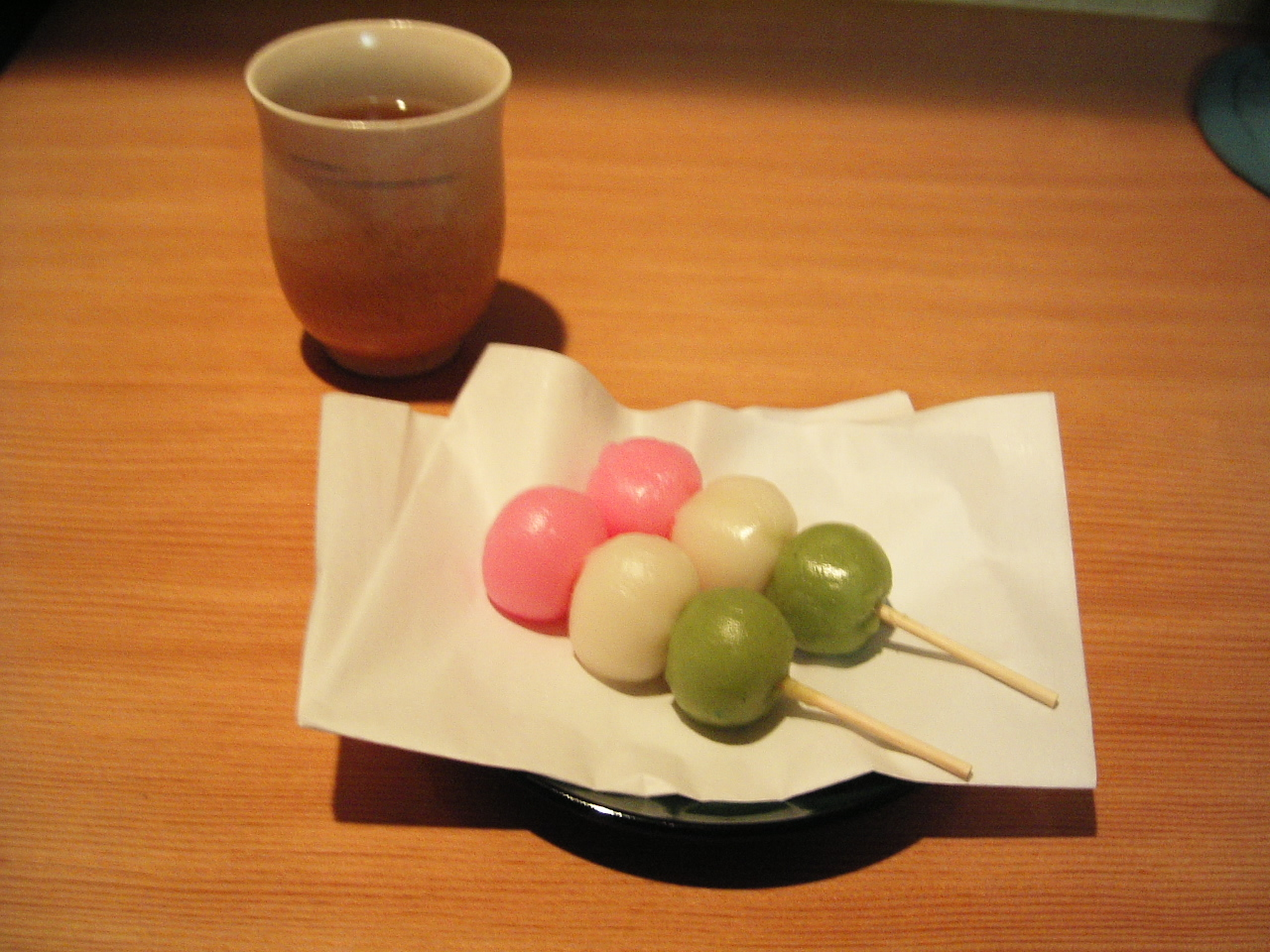
Hanami dango

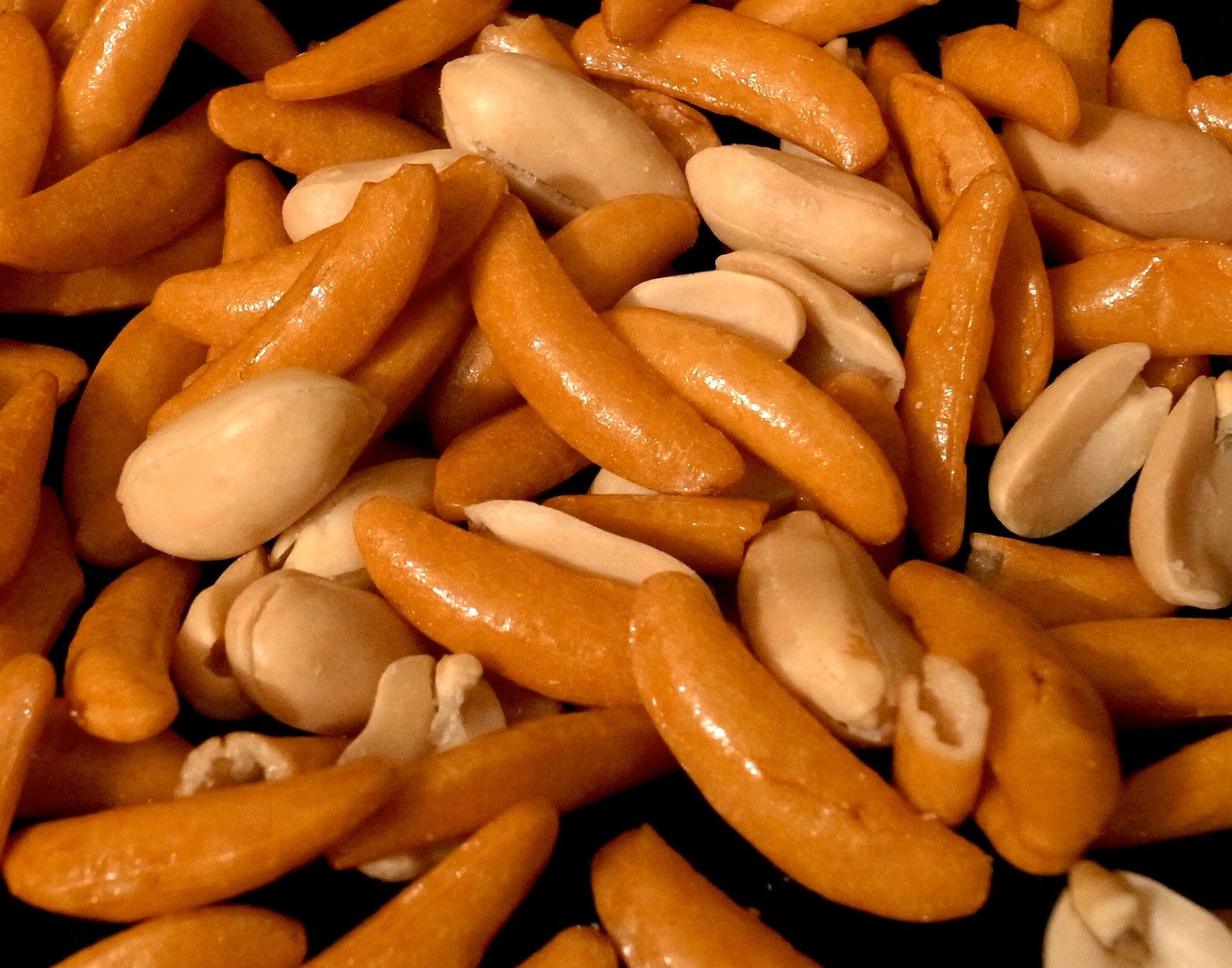
Kaki no tane

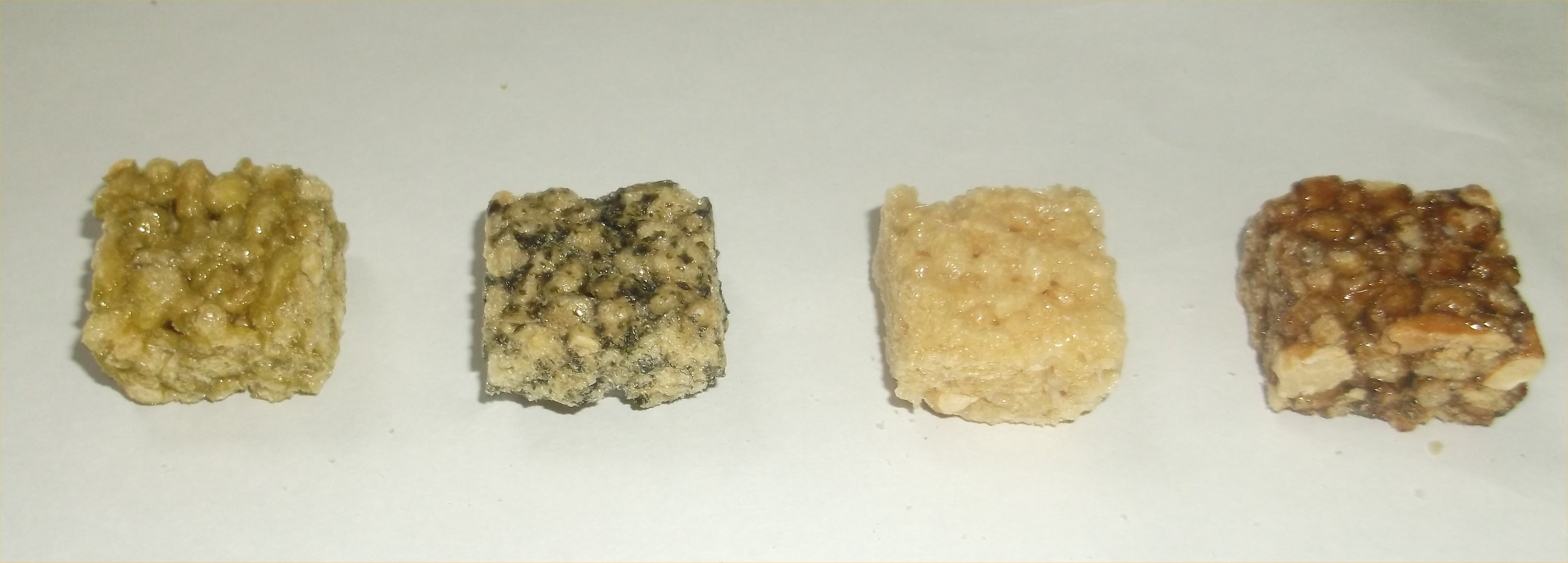
Kaminari okoshi

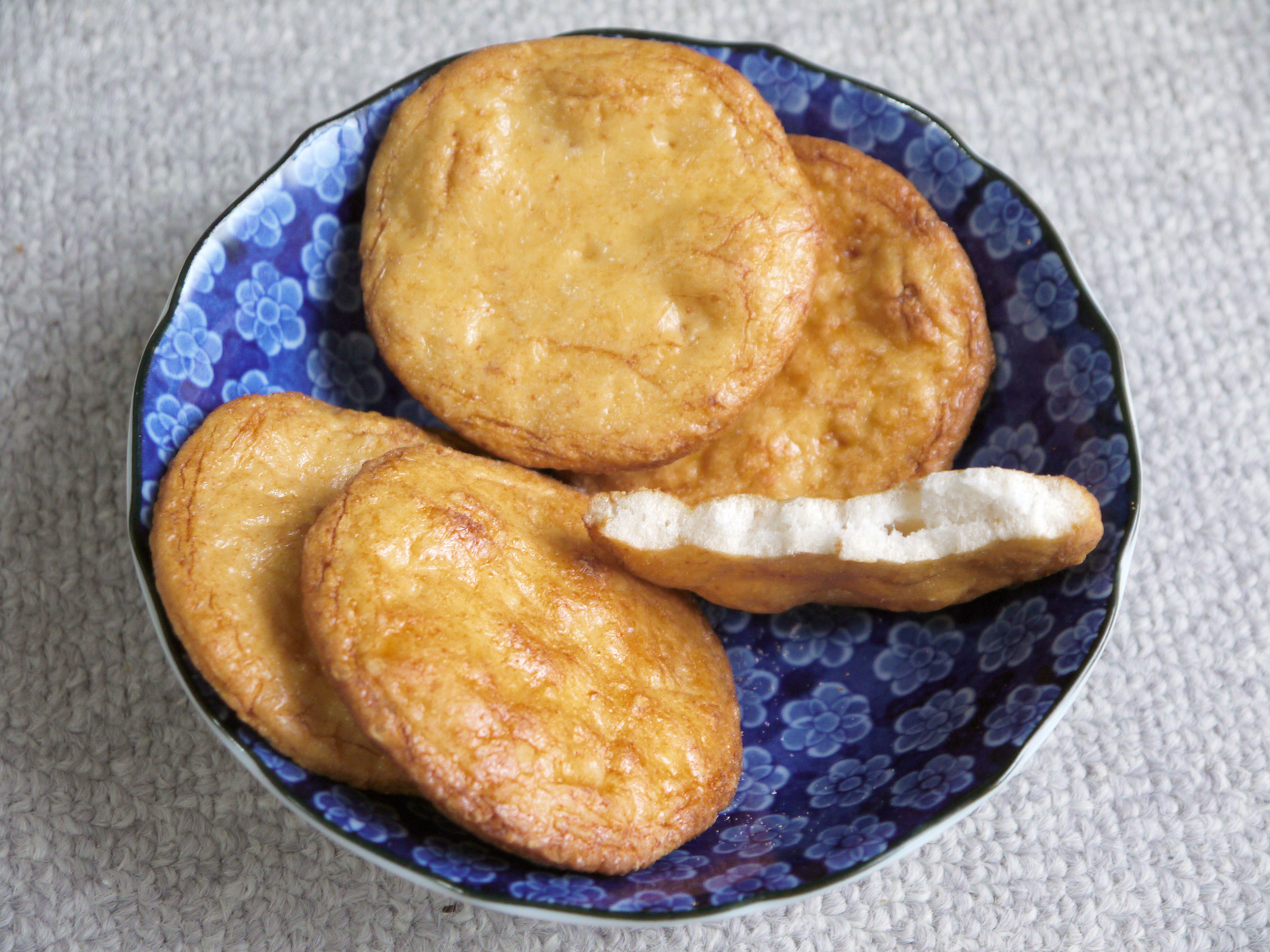
Senbei

brand

- Bakauke
- Olive no Hana
- Onigiri senbei
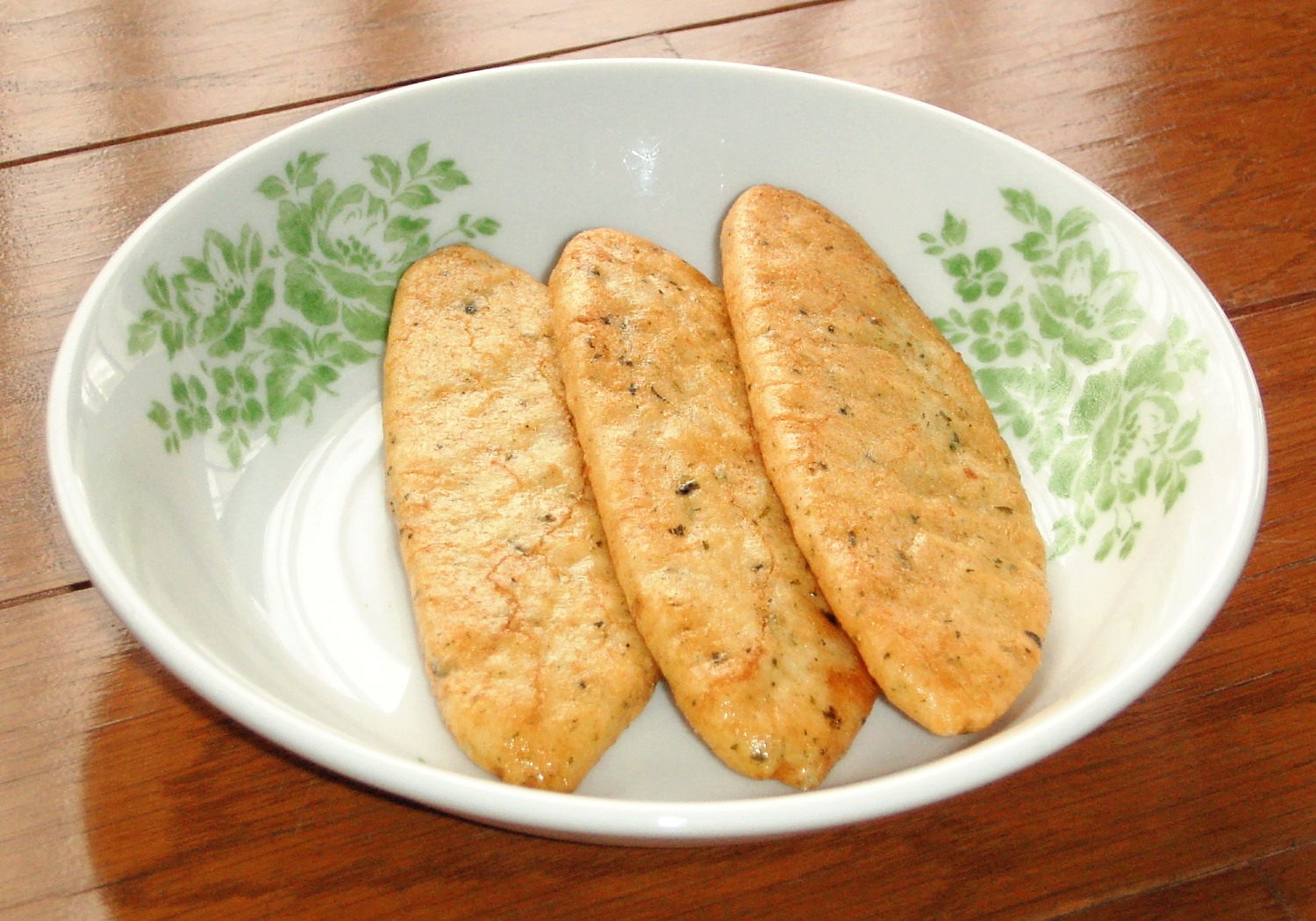
Bakauke

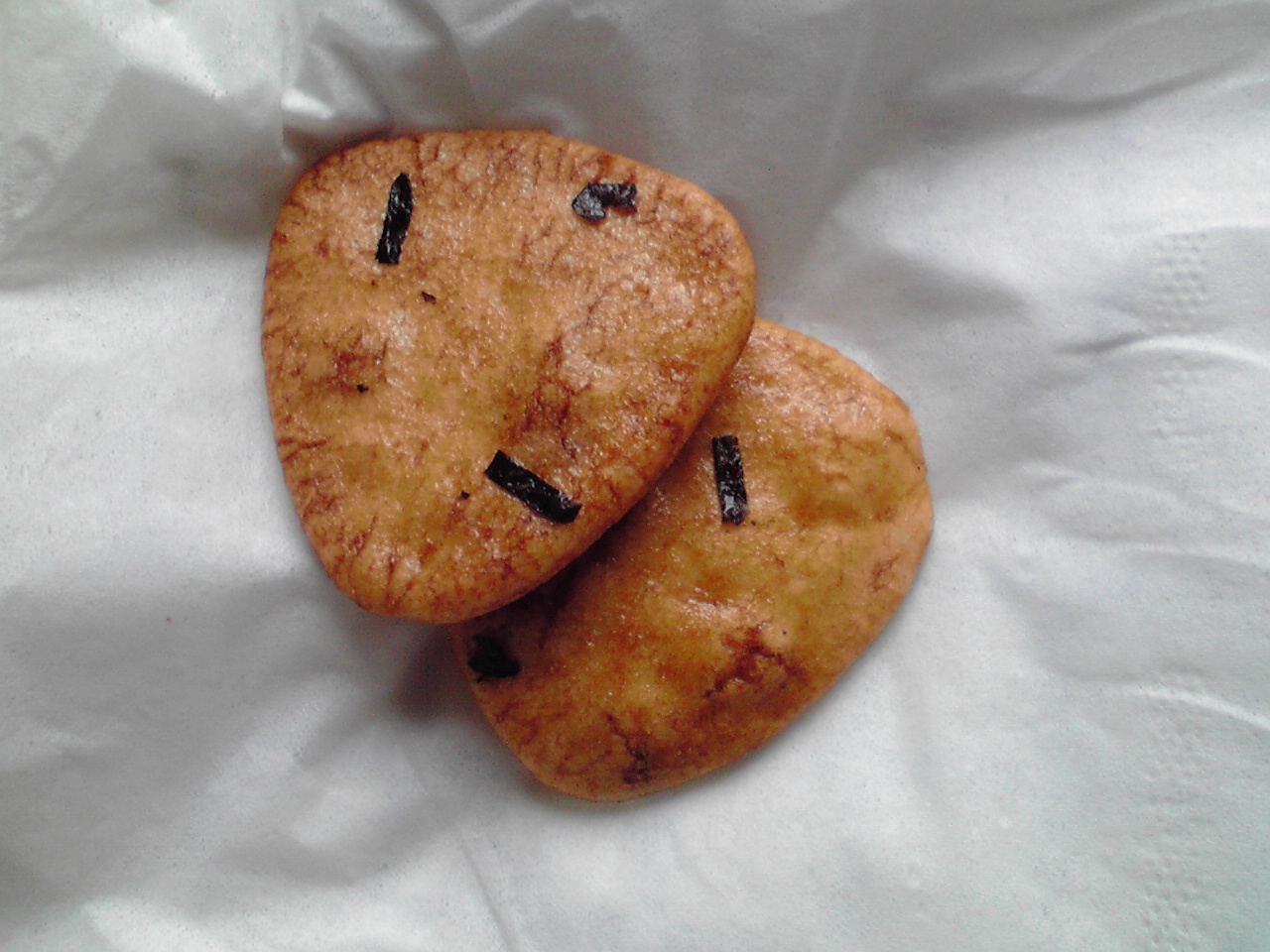
Onigiri senbei

=== Seafood ===
- Big Katsu
- Ebi senbei
- Gyoniku soseji, a surimi fish sausage
- Miyako Konbu
- Surume
- Yotchan Ika

=== Street foods ===
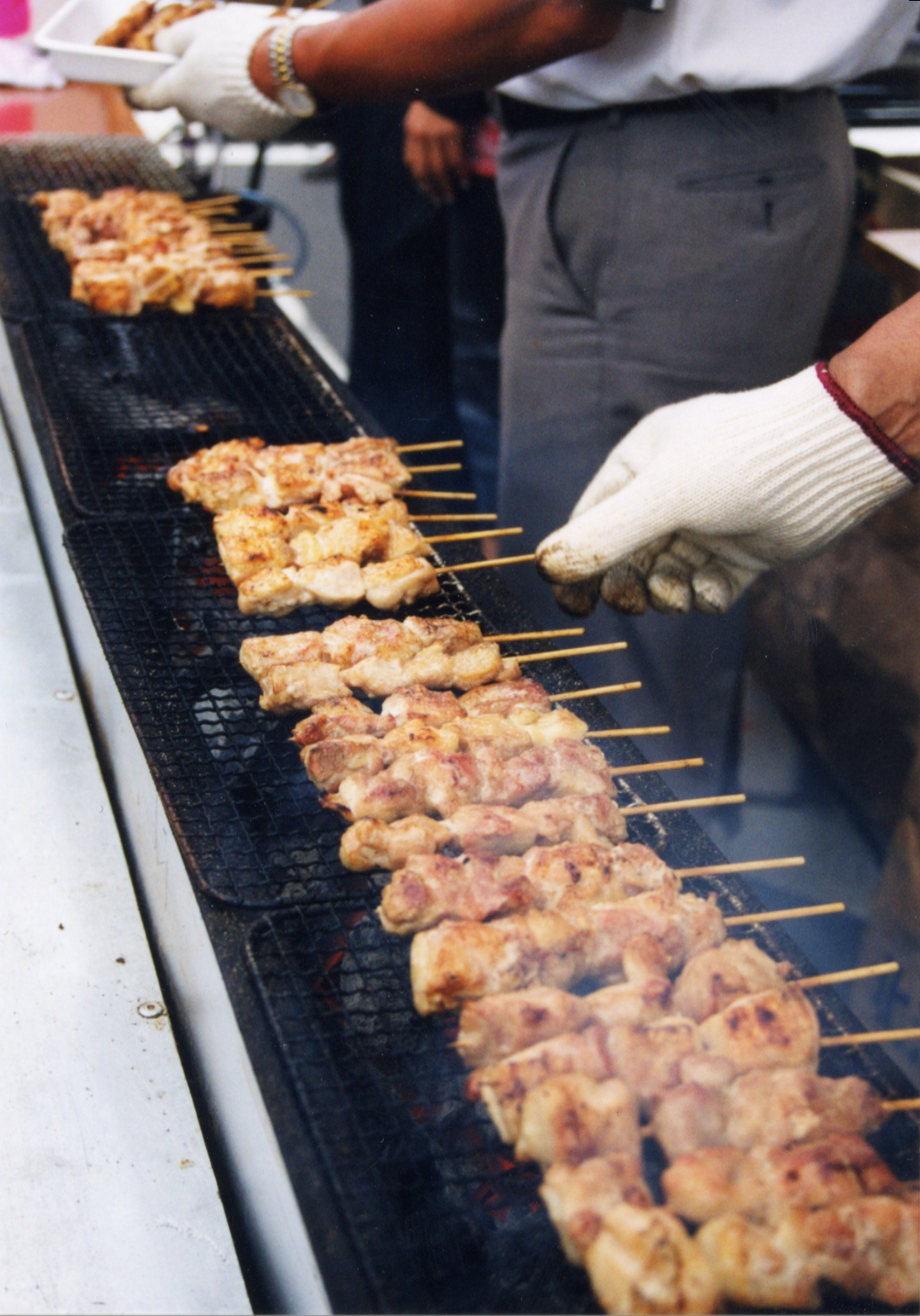
Grilling yakitori

- Dorayaki
- Korokke
- Nikuman
- Ōbanyaki
- Taiyaki
- Takoyaki
- Yakitori

=== Mixed and other ===
- Ajigonomi
- Don Tacos

== Producers ==
- Calbee
- Glico
- Kameda Seika
- Koikeya
- Kuriyama Beika
- Lotte
- Meiji
- Morinaga
- Tohato
- Yamayoshi

== See also ==
- Japanese instant noodles
- List of Japanese dishes
- List of snack foods by country
- Snacking
- Wagashi
- Sakana
