= Takenoko no sato =

Japanese snack food

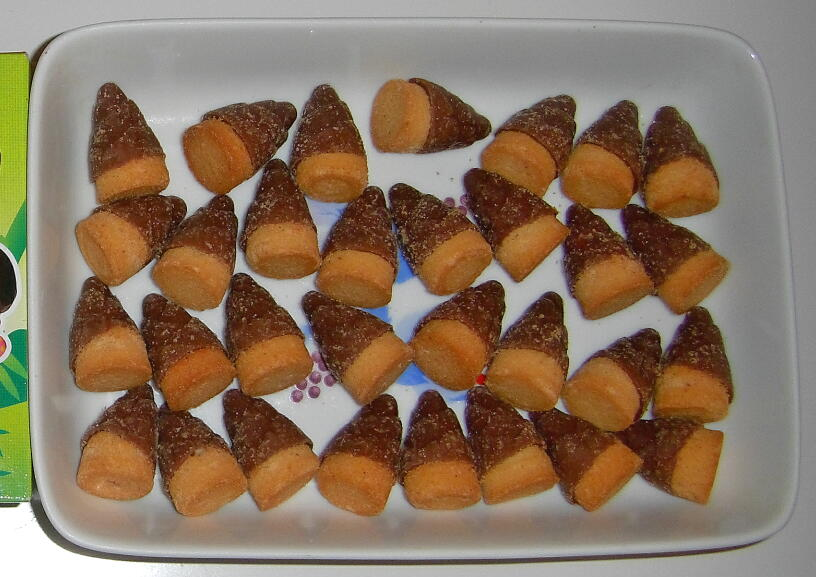
Takenoko no sato laid out on a plate, with its package on the left.

Takenoko no sato (たけのこの里, lit. 'Bamboo Shoot Village'), branded as Chococones in the United States, is a Japanese snack food produced by Meiji Seika since 1979. It is a chocolate-covered cookie shaped like a bamboo shoot.

Following the success of a similar snack, Kinoko no yama, first sold in 1975, Takenoko no sato was released in 1979. In 2024, due to the high price of cocoa beans, the cocoa content was reduced and the candy was reclassified as "quasi chocolate sweet", dropping its previous "chocolate sweet" classification. (Note: Japan has a special scale to classify chocolate products as listed in Types of chocolate#Japan.)

In a similar fashion to Kinoko no yama (branded as Chocorooms), Takenoko no sato was renamed to Chococones, and had its packaging changed in the United States. Chococones were discontinued in the United States in 2016.

== Comparison with Kinoko no yama ==
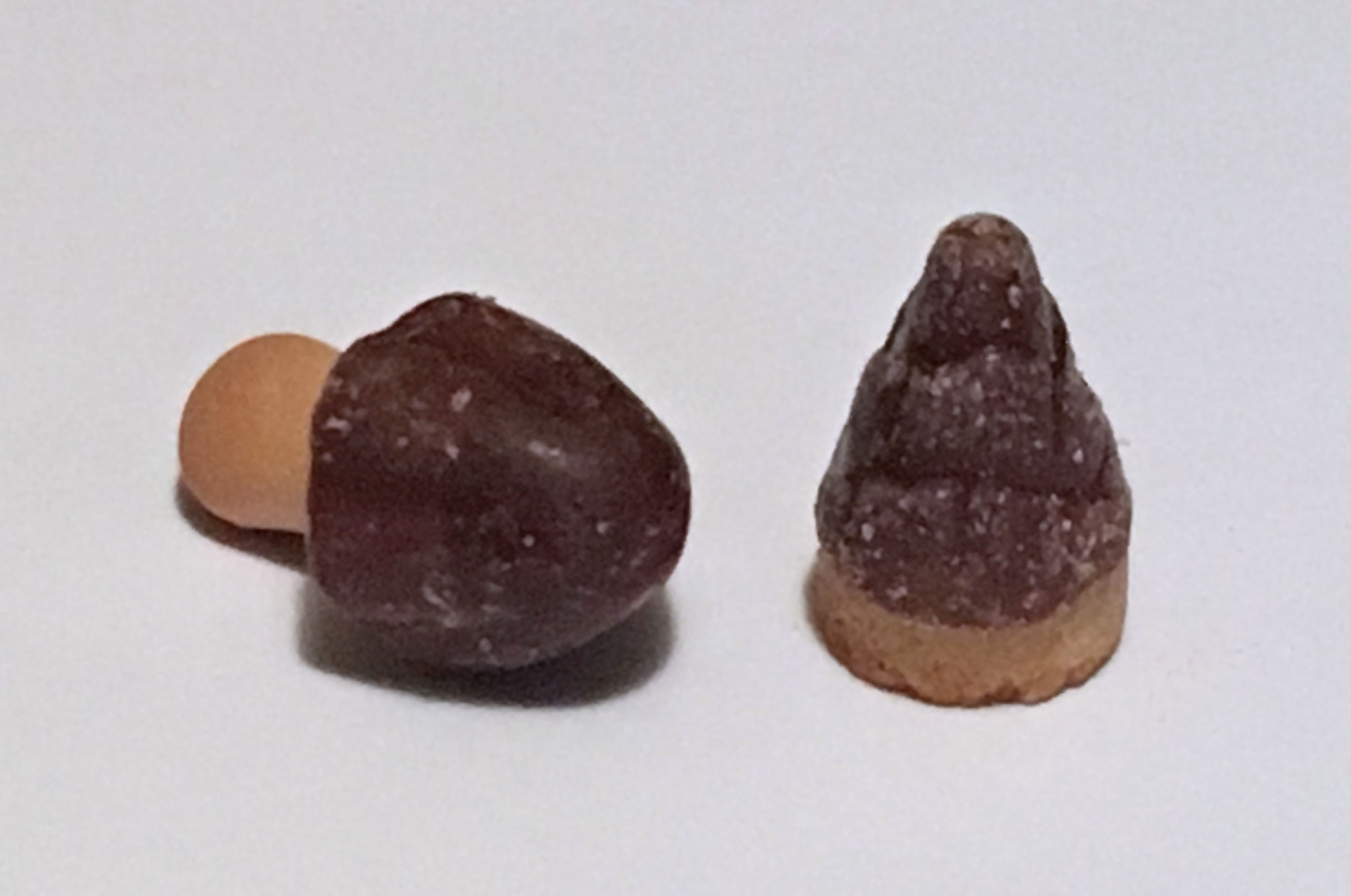
Chocorooms (Kinoko no yama) and Chococones (Takenoko no sato)

Kinoko vs Takenoko (Japanese: きのこたけのこ戦争, Hepburn: Kinoko-Takenoko Sensō; lit. 'Kinoko-Takenoko War') is a debate between consumers over which one of Kinoko no yama and Takenoko no sato, both made by Meiji Co., is better. This trend of comparing the two products began from the 1980s and has become an Internet meme in the 21st century. Meiji has held several votes to decide which chocolate is better, with Takenoko no sato winning most of the votes. According to a survey by Meiji Co., older generations tend to prefer Kinoko no yama.

== See also ==
- Chocolate in Japan
