= Chocolate in Japan =

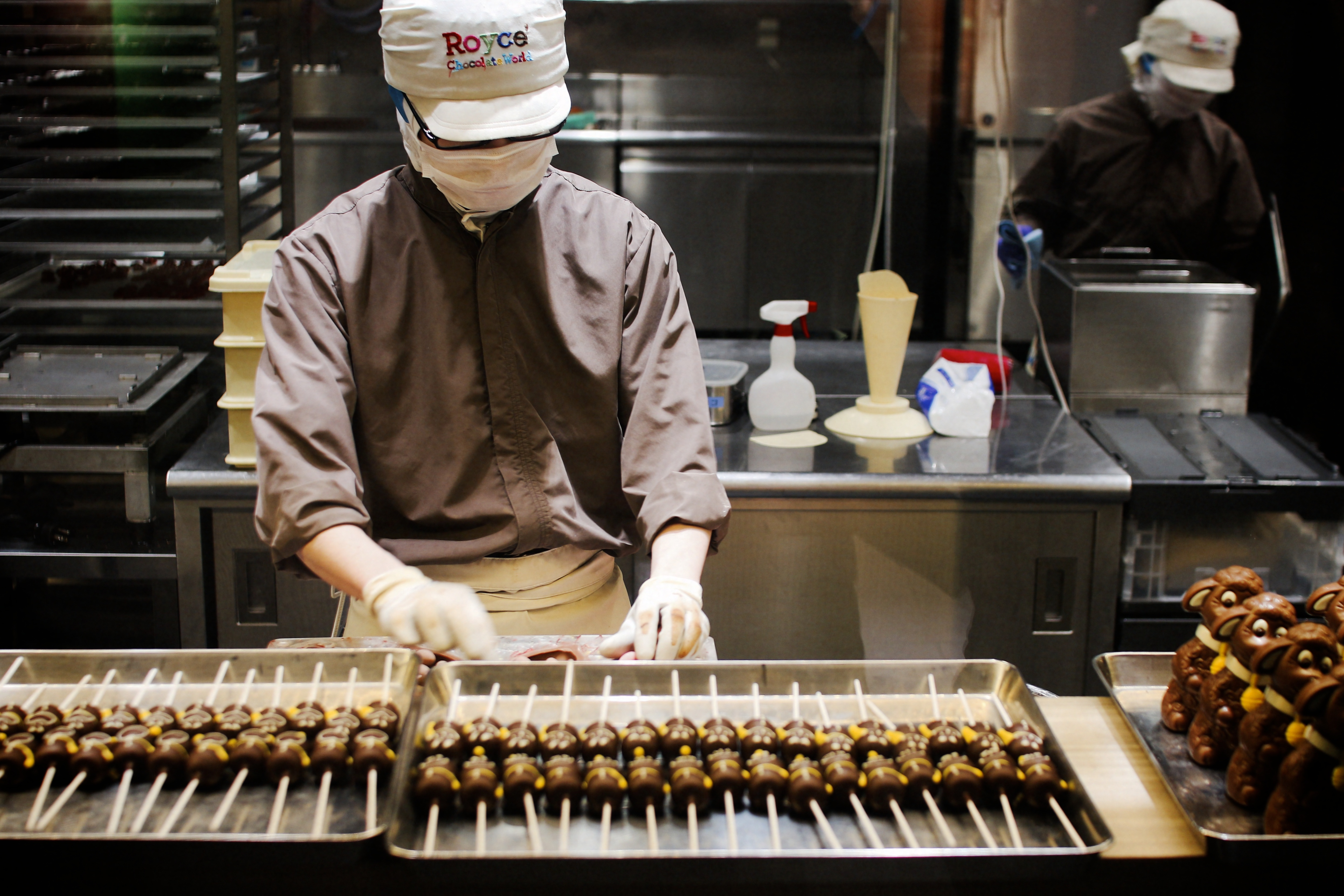
Royce' chocolate factory in Chitose, Hokkaido

Chocolate has been made and eaten in Japan since the 1870s, and has been among the country's most popular confections since the 1960s. As of 2015, Japan was the largest consumer of chocolate in Asia. Within the country, chocolate is regarded as a foreign food, and is most often eaten as bars or as products targeting premium markets. Some chocolates made in Japan are unusual internationally, produced in shapes such as mushrooms and bamboo shoots, and in a broader range of flavors. Matcha-pairings are particularly popular. A large share of Japan's chocolate is sold around Valentine's Day.

Chocolates were first sold in Japan as the country emerged from a period of isolationism (sakoku). Manufacturers initially formed their chocolate products from chocolate purchased from overseas, and struggled to gain market share against producers of the traditional Japanese confection wagashi. Chocolate began to gain popularity in the early 20th century as manufacturers marketed it as nutritious and hygienic, and in 1918 Morinaga & Company began producing the first chocolate made in Japan.

Over the following decades, consumption of chocolate increased and corporations like Meiji Co. entered the industry. Production was paused in World War II as cocoa bean imports were halted. After the war, American G.I.s stationed in Japan distributed chocolate to children, making a great impression. Following the war, advertisements began to target children as the primary chocolate and by the mid-1960s chocolate had become the highest selling confection in Japan.

== Forms ==
Within Japan, chocolate is fundamentally considered a foreign food. Domestically, the city of Kobe is most associated with chocolate, having hosted a large foreign population at the turn of the 20th century. In contrast with South Korea where most chocolate is incorporated into baked goods like cookies and cakes, most chocolate is eaten as chocolate bars and in products catering to a premium market. In bakeries, chocolate is used to fill anpan.

A distinction is observed between chocolates made locally and those made internationally. Those made in Japan are typically sold in convenience or grocery stores. Many resemble chocolates sold elsewhere in both flavor and form, though some are distinct, such as products shaped to resemble mushrooms (Kinoko no yama) and bamboo (Takenoko no sato). Other distinctions come from the popularity of flavors such as matcha, and the presence of some that are unusual outside of the country, such as purple sweet potato and sun-dried tomato. Chocolates are not limited to single flavors, with some containing three or more. Chocolates made in Europe are sold in department stores and those serving upmarket clientele, reflecting the high regard European chocolate is held in. By contrast, American chocolate is viewed as far inferior to that made in Europe, and is rarely sold.

== History ==
=== Early history ===
Chocolate mentioned in the Ranryō hō 蘭療⽅ (1804)

Records of chocolate in Japan date to at least 1797 in Dejima, an artificial island off Nagasaki which was one of the few places in Japan where foreign trade was permitted. The first records describe a drink made in the European manner—hot, with eggs and sugar. Drinks were the primary form chocolate was consumed in, and it was not until the mid-19th century that the modern solid eating chocolate was invented. 18th century Japan was very familiar with European sweets, and those introduced by the Portuguese in the 16th and 17th centuries were particularly popular. Despite this, chocolate would not gain popularity until later.

In 1853, the Perry Expedition forced the end of Japan's semi-isolationism, which had for centuries curtailed the influence of the Western world. What exactly could be learned from the Western world was not immediately clear to Japan's politicians and intellectuals, and in 1871, a group of prominent figures set out on the Iwakura Mission to visit the United States and Europe and learn about industrialization. In January 1873, the expeditionists toured a large factory in France—likely Menier—which manufactured chocolate bars. Reports of their impression vary: food historian Tatsuya writes that the product and production impressed them, and says the Iwakura Mission returned to Japan with an impression of chocolate as "luxurious, portable and modern", while food historian Kushner describes the contingent as repelled by the odours of butter and milk.

=== Japanese chocolate bars ===
The first chocolate bars produced in Japan appeared four years later in 1879, made by Yonezu Fūgetsudō, a confectioner in the Ryōgoku district of Tokyo. Fūgetsudō had by then been in the confectionery business for twenty years, working in both the Western (namban-gashi) and Japanese (wagashi) traditions of Japanese sweets. Though he had never left Japan, he took frequent trips to Yokohama, a city south of Tokyo, where a large foreign settlement existed. On one of these trips he met Tanito Shunjirō, a pastry chef working at a French confectionery company, from whom Fūgetsudō likely learned chocolate making. Fūgetsudō began selling his chocolate in 1888. Because he lacked the technology to process cocoa beans himself into chocolate, he purchased processed ingredients from foreign companies, a practice followed by all chocolate makers in Japan for the next 30 years. Fūgetsudō's first newspaper advertisements promoted a connection between chocolate and France.

Early sellers, including Fūgetsudō, sold both Western and Japanese confectionery in the one store. They struggled to break into the mature Japanese confectionery market, and by 1895 in Tokyo 20 Japanese-Western confectionery stores competed with 357 selling wagashi. Into this scene in the final years of the 20th century, major international chocolate makers, including Cadbury, J. S. Fry & Sons, Van Houten, and Menier began selling in Japan, although their audience is unclear, and may have only included foreigners and the wealthy. Consumers understood chocolate as modern and western, but also viewed it with some uncertainty; unsure of where it could fit in their daily diets, and how it was distinct from wagashi. Other causes for the limited consumption include the cheaper prices of Japanese alternatives, appealing for students, and according to Maekawa (2025) a lack of familiarity with milk and animal fats.

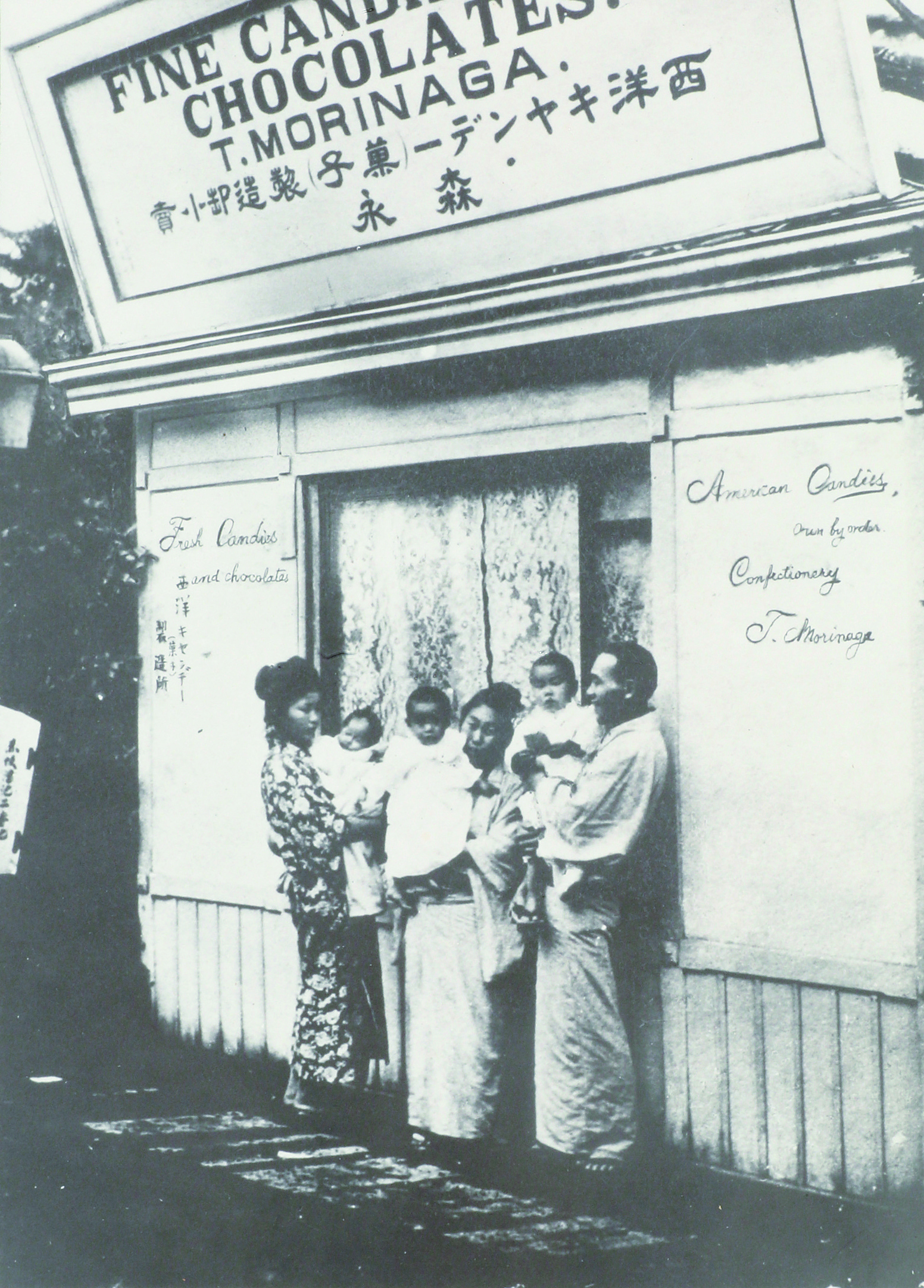
Original Morinaga store, pictured in 1902

The connection to the west in the advertising of Western-Japanese confectioners was extensive, and sellers often claimed their products were "English-American copies". A store opened in 1899 by entrepreneur Taichiro Morinaga that only sold Western confectionery went further. Unlike Fūgetsudō, Morinaga grew up in Meiji era, and was recently returned from a decade in the United States where he had spent time studying confectionery-making in California. (Note: After converting to Christianity, Morinaga returned to Japan in 1892 to perform mission work, but shortly returned to America to take up training in confectionery.) Outside his shop he hung a sign in English: "American fresh candy and chocolate", drew a clientele of the western-born wives of diplomats and politicians who also found his identity as a Christian confectioner appealing. The business earned him a request to deliver chocolate to the Imperial Palace. Part of Morinaga's choice to target western audiences came from his reputation in the Western-Japanese confectioner community, where he was ostracized for his foreign training and his past selling pottery. Further distance from other producers came from his desire to emulate the scale and form of the large Western chocolate companies rather than the small, local wagashi manufacturers.

=== Health claims ===
The 1900 Paris Exposition marked a turning point in attitudes towards chocolate and wagashi. The world fair had been viewed as an important diplomatic opportunity by the Japanese government, and through their encouragement Japanese craftspeople sent tens of thousands of items. Among these included confections, mostly wagashi, and some producers were dispatched to Paris to make wagashi freshly on-site. Contemporary reports described a warm reception for the craftsmanship of the wagashi, and the dispatched contingent were awarded a silver medal at the end of the fair.

Despite the praise, many of the Japanese attendees were despondent. "This prize does absolutely nothing for us" said the Great Japanese Confectionary Association. Those present described a distinction that had been made clear between wagashi and western sweets: wagashi, developed to provide a visual accompaniment to green tea, was flavoured and scented so as not to distract from the drinking experience. Western confections on the other hand were produced for taste, and could contain nutritive ingredients such as milk and eggs. To them, this demonstrated a clear superiority of Western sweets. (Note: Some producers of wagashi did not view the presentation as demonstrating an inferiority of their sweets, but rather viewed the product and production as so distinct that comparisons were meaningless.)

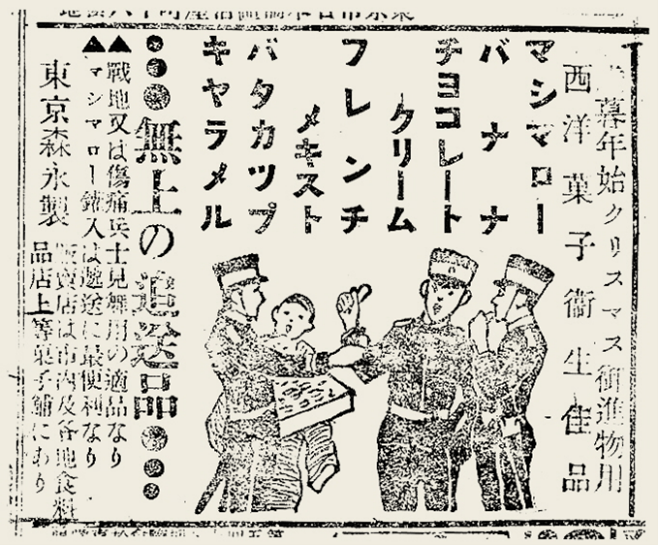
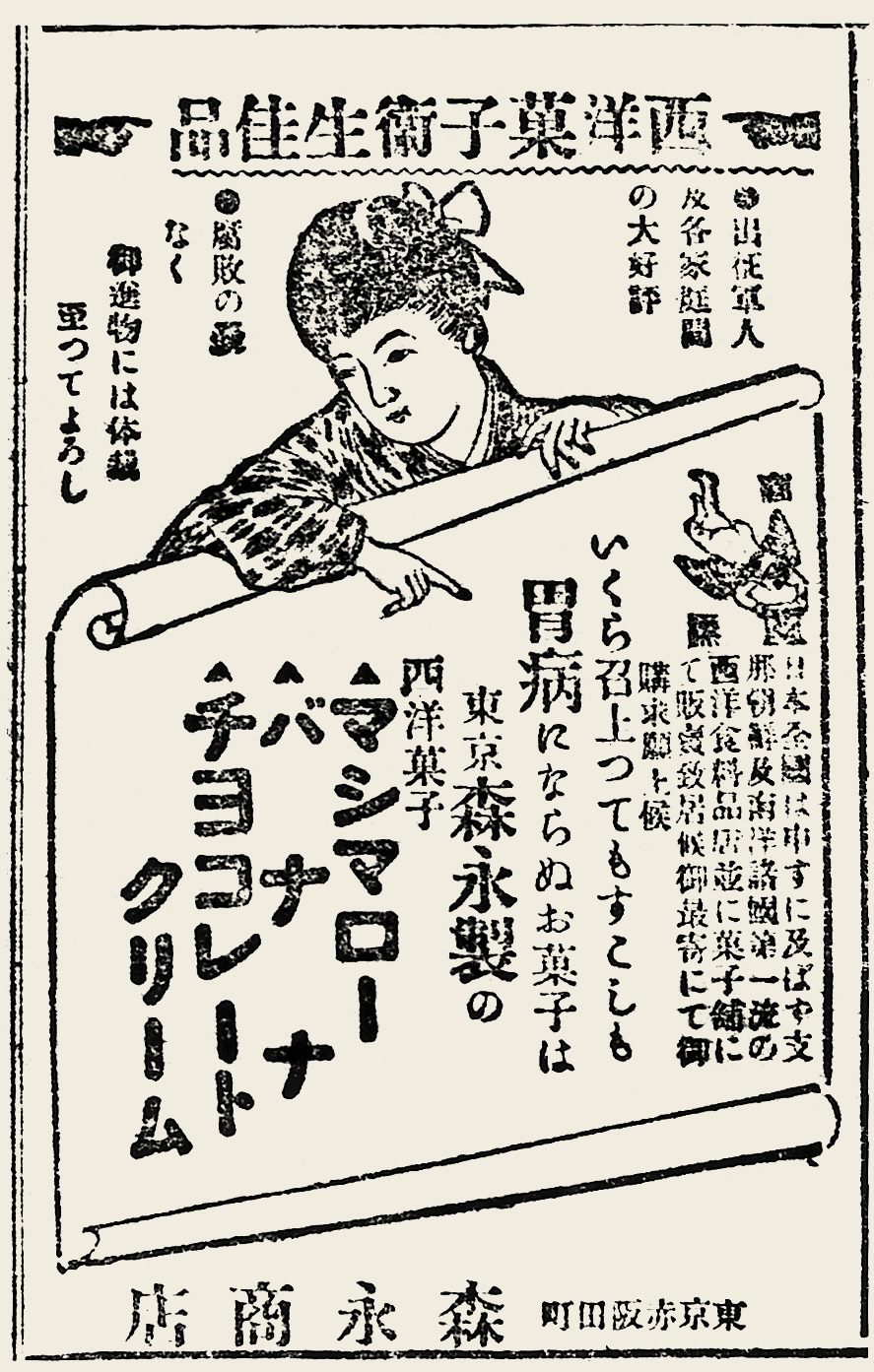
Morinaga advertisements from 1904 and 1905 for Western sweets, including chocolate. Both emphasize health.

Ingredients were not the only way that chocolate was understood to be more healthy. Until the entrance of western sweets in Japan, wagashi was made in the back of the shops they were sold in. In stores, confections were left out in boxes uncovered and exposed to the air. At the time of purchase, customers would express how much they wanted, and merchants would measure into bags or old newspapers, in some instances blowing air into bags to allow more sweets to fit. Contrasting with such conditions, chocolate and other western sweets were mass-produced in large factories, and were sold pre-measured and pre-packaged in silver foil or paper.

Confectioners in Japan reacted by altering their marketing. Less emphasis was put on the western associations of chocolate, and in its place chocolate was marketed for its purported healthfulness and its ability to be eaten anywhere, in any season. In winter they advertised chocolate as a source of energy, and in summer as a nutritious digestive. An example of this could be seen in marketing from Morinaga in 1918, which attested that "Chocolate is the perfect nutrient. By contrast to the best flour, it contains more than twice the amount of nitrogen and 15 times more fat with starch and pleasing aroma. Theobromine also heightens appetite and helps digestion". By 1905, figures in the confectionery industry were complaining about an excessive emphasis on nutrition, arguing that eggs and milk were being added to products to permit health claims at the expense of taste. Despite this, nutrition remained central to chocolate marketing until the 1950s.

Outside of advertisements, parents in the 1910s received contrasting advice from pediatricians on whether they should be feeding their children chocolate. One publication recommending mothers feed chocolate to their children came in 1912, based on the idea that it contained nutrients lacking in wagashi. A dissenting view could be read in 1916 from Takeuchi Kunpei, with warnings that parents who fed chocolate to their children under the age of four may face overstimulation that impacted sleep.

=== Growth in industry ===
By the 1910s, growing demand began drawing domestic and international firms into chocolate manufacturing. The Swiss firm Nestlé was among the first of these international organizations, setting up operations in Yokohama in 1912. Nestlé advertised its chocolates as an energizing food source that was to be eaten outdoors in line with other advertisers, although unusually for the time Nestlé's advertisements associated chocolate with children, which was then more common in Europe. Other companies that entered the market in the 1910s and early 1920s included Goncharoff Shōkai in Kobe, founded by a Russian immigrant, and Ezaki Glico in Osaka.

By 1918, there were no manufacturers in Japan making their own chocolate. That year, Morinaga began taking steps to make his own chocolate and achieve his goal of creating a large, industrial chocolate company like those in Europe which would no longer rely on other countries for cacao processing. He sent a trusted employee to America to purchase equipment, and invited an American engineer to Japan to advise. By June, Morinaga's factory in Tamachi was outfitted with new machinery, and within months it was producing a "bitter cream chocolate", then milk chocolate, and in the new year chocolate drinks. These new chocolates were significantly cheaper than those of Morinaga's competitors, priced at 15 sen (equivalent to US$1.17 in 2019) for a milk chocolate block containing 40 pieces, and brought immediate profit. In 1921, Morinaga dispatched more employees to acquire more complex machinery, and over the next four years underwent installation. These machines gave manufacturers greater control of humidity and input size.

1918 advertisements from Morinaga, promoting the first chocolate made in Japan.

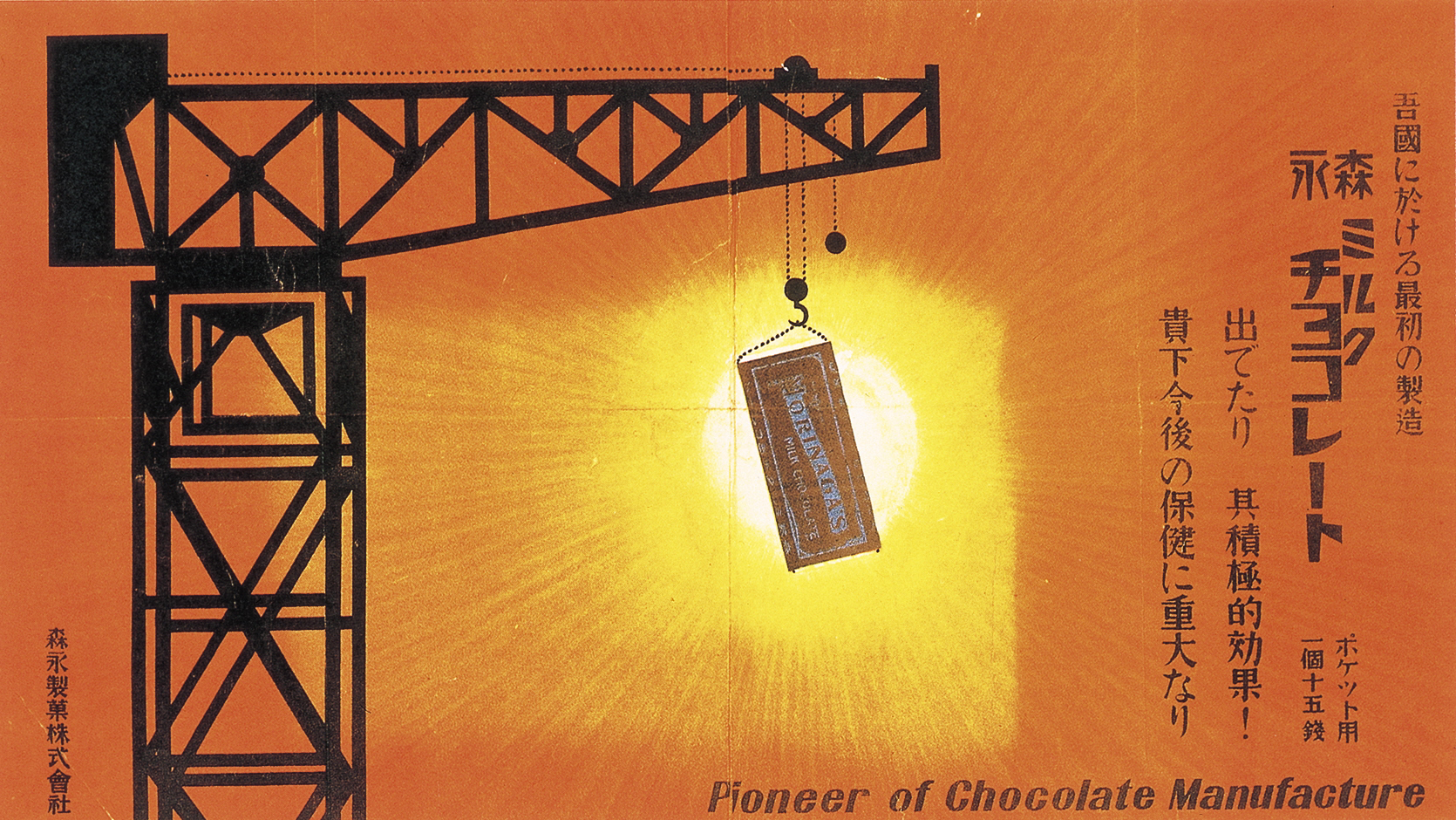

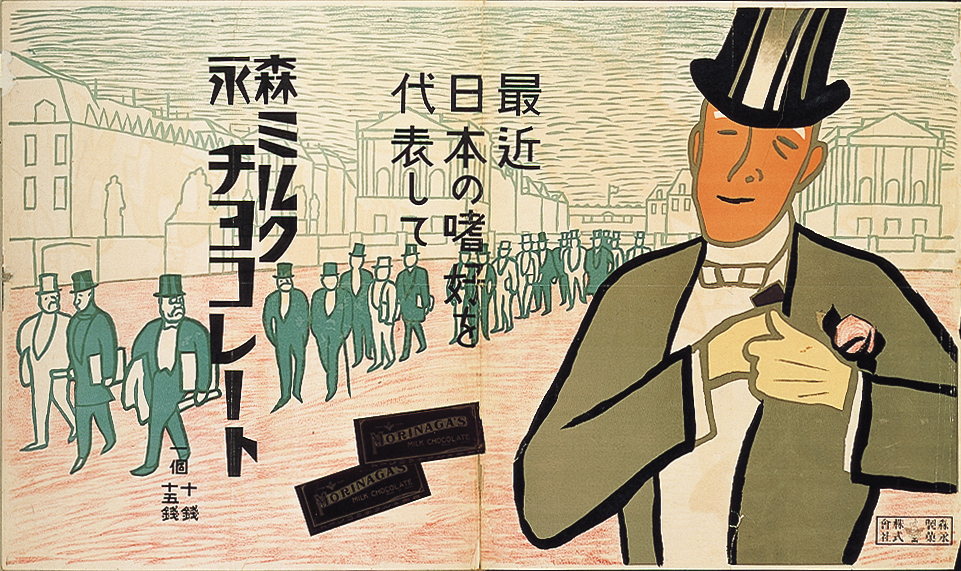

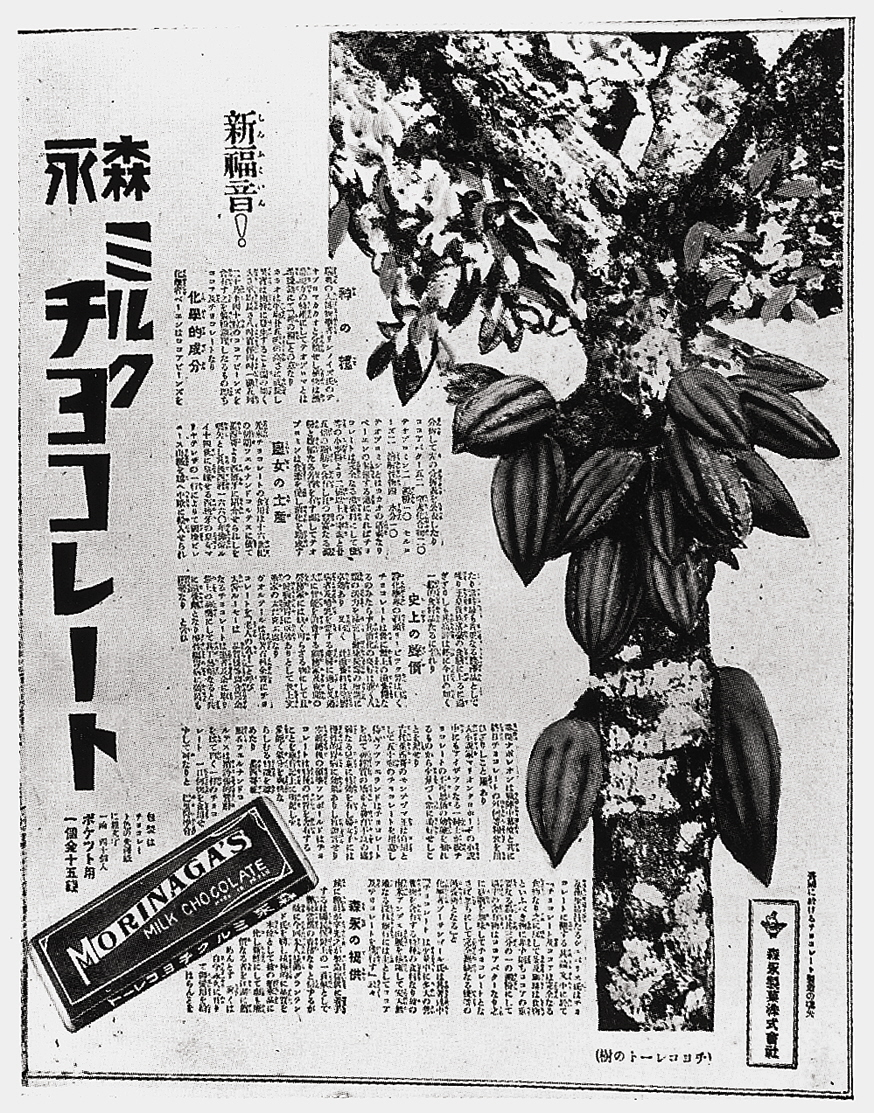

Morinaga's largest competitor entered the Japanese chocolate industry in the mid-1920s. Meiji Co. was a large and wealthy sugar manufacturer that had begun making confectionery in 1916 with a spinoff. Like Morinaga, Meiji's CEOs dispatched employees to Europe to purchase equipment, and brought advisers from America. They built a factory in 1925 in Kawasaki, Kanagawa, and were producing chocolate the following year. Apart from Morinaga's chocolate bars and drinking chocolate, various companies introduced a number of sweets from the late 1910s through 1920s, including chocolate shaped as cigarettes, toys and dolls, and those flavored with liquor, vanilla, and fruit. In 1930, Morinaga brought chocolate in the shapes of harmonicas and sportsfigures, the first time chocolate and music and sports were connected, which was to become a longstanding association. Meiji's chocolate advertisements through the late 1920s presented an image of chocolate as aiding performance, with the men and women in its marketing now able to break long-jump records, carry luggage on vacation, and succeed in business.

Chocolates produced in large factories were received with some ambivalence. On the one hand, factories were appreciated for their sterile conditions, contrasting with the perceived and actual issues of wagashi made unhygienically in the back of shops. Companies cultivated this attribute, with Morinaga designing its factories to resemble hospitals, and Meiji opening their factories for public tours in the 1930s. On the other hand, the scale of chocolate production meant confections were often made far from where they were eaten. For many consumers, this was undesirable, especially when contrasted with the appeal of wagashi produced in their neighbourhoods. Over time, hygiene concerns won out as imagery of dirty hands turned consumers, particularly middle-class women, off the idea of hand-made confections.

In 1936, the first efforts were made at introducing Valentine's Day to Japan by the confectionery company Morozoff Ltd.. The targets of the efforts were foreigners residing in the area around Kobe, but the holiday attracted little observance.

=== War and occupation ===
Throughout the 1930s, companies had boosted chocolate consumption through advertising, with the volume of marketing increasing over time. This continued as the Second Sino-Japanese War began in 1937. One such campaign, begun in June 1938, had Meiji driving a car stocked with chocolates and caramels from town to town. Over a sound system, the "Meiji Caramel Song" and the "Meiji Chocolate Song" played, the latter featuring lyrics including "I am a young boy from the south, feeling the beautiful chocolate melt in my mouth", invoking a popular association between confectionery and the southern Japanese islands. Chocolate was also linked to the war, with Meiji that year releasing the film Chocolate and Soldiers with an accompanying, popular of the song name. The film follows a soldier who sends chocolate wrappers back home from the front to assist his son in winning a competition, and concludes with the chocolate company paying for his son's education when they were moved by the soldier's actions and subsequent death on the battlefield.

As war conditions set in, domestic production of chocolate was hampered by the cessession of cocoa bean imports in 1940, and it was not until 1950 that imports resumed. Among Japanese people, it is the period immediately following World War II when chocolate is understood to have entered the country in the popular imagination. American GIs distributed chocolates to children on the street, creating an image of benevolvence and an identity among a generation of Japanese who later identified themselves as ones who had chased American GIs, asking for chocolate. (Note: Some versions have them asking for chewing gum.) Among American allies who lacked the resources to engage in such gifting, the American's actions were understood as a source of disadvantage in occupied Japan.

An early example of post-war chocolate production came in 1948. The previous October, the Japanese National Confectioners Association was notified by the government that the Americans would be sending Japan cocoa in an effort to boost morale. After consultations with Meiji and Morinaga, it was decided that the cocoa would be used to produce chocolate caramels, and factories across Japan were engaged for speedy production. By August, the treats were being given to children and heavy industry workers.

=== Post-war appeal to children ===
As production of confectionery restarted in the post-war period, established sweets companies Fujiya and Glico joined Morinaga and Meiji in the manufacture of Western-style confectionery (yōgashi). Even as children now knew the taste of chocolate from their encounters with GIs, chocolate bars were too expensive for most of them to eat with any regularity, with a single bar costing five times more than some boxes of caramels, and caramels proliferated in the late 1940s. Even so, chocolate companies identified a market for chocolate among children. Beginning in the late 1950s, the four major chocolate companies began running large scale advertising campaigns at scales not previously seen in the country, in what newspapers dubbed a "chocolate war". These campaigns targeted children, and included competitions with prizes for paid-trips across the world to the winning children. The era of chocolate advertisements emphasizing health benefit claims was over.

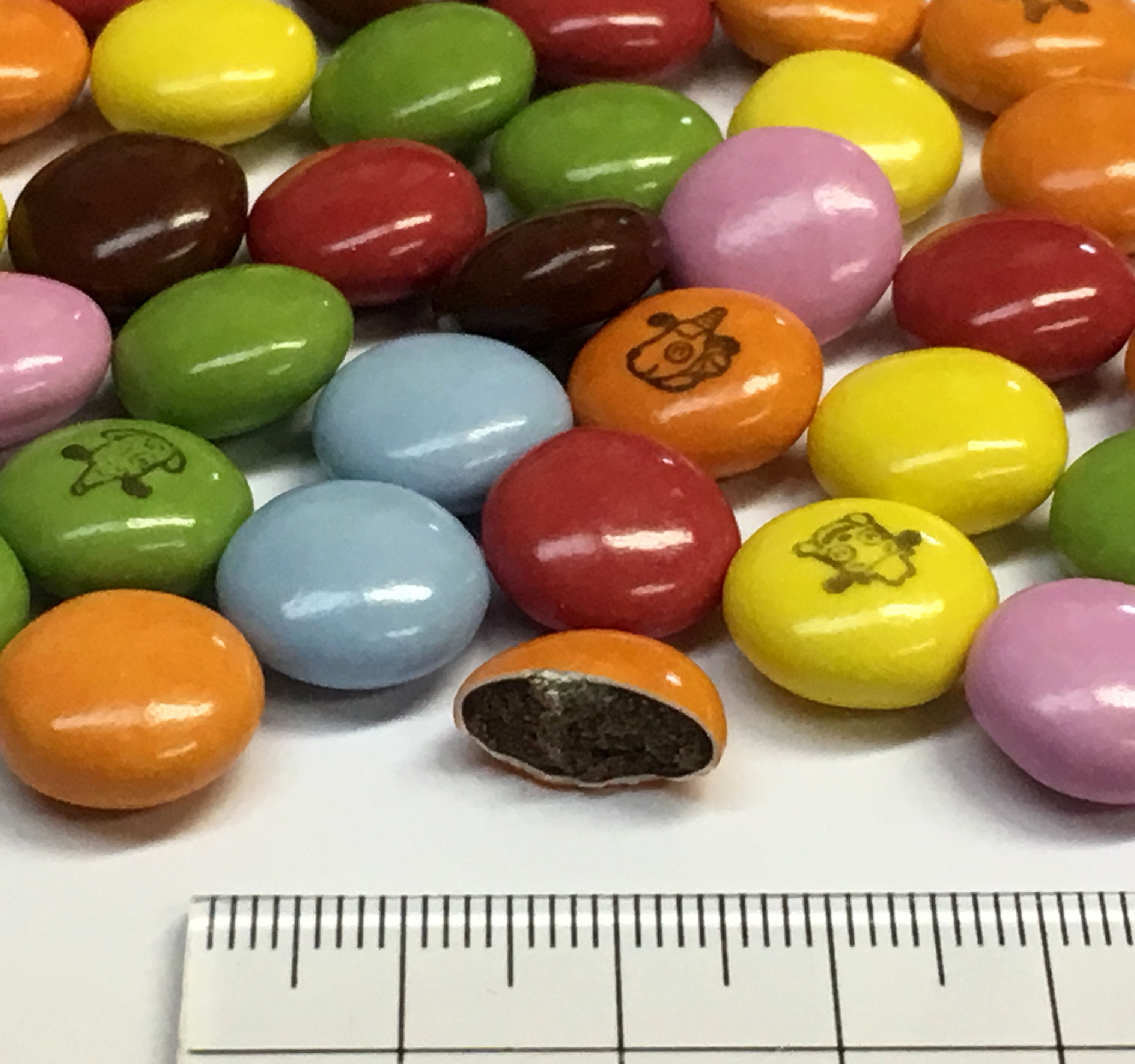
Meiji Marble Chocolate

In 1962, complaints from smaller chocolate manufacturers who could not afford elaborate marketing schemes brought pressure from the Fair Trade Commission, and agreements were made to reduce the intensity of chocolate advertising. Chocolate advertisements continued over a range of mediums, including children's television, when in 1963 Meiji advertised "Marble Chocolate" (a candy-coated chocolate based on the British and American Smarties and M&M's) as a tie-in to the cartoon Astro Boy. Stickers depicting the show's characters were provided with the purchase of chocolate, quickly becoming a fad, and other chocolate manufacturers followed suit, including Morinaga sponsoring the anime Wolf Boy Ken. (Note: In this period, Glico engaged in a tie-in with an anime adaptation of Tetsujin 28-go, and Fujiya with an anime adaptation of Obake no Q-Tarō.)

Chocolate production increased dramatically. Between 1955 and 1963, the value of the chocolate being produced in Japan increased fourfold, rising from less than 5% of the Japanese confectionery market to over 15%. By the early-to- mid 1960s, chocolate had become the most popular confection in Japan. Postwar histories of chocolate describe the years of 1960–1965 as "the golden age of chocolate", and Meiji was the dominant force, accounting for 38% of the entire market and 58% of the children's market. Meiji's advertising on TV and radio in this time was ubiquitous, and a campaign featuring a character named Marble-chan, played by a five-year-old Uehara Yukari, was received with popular and critical acclaim. In retrospective assessments of the history of Japanese advertising, the period between 1962 and 1964 is known as "the age of Meiji Seika".

By the end of the decade, savory sweets had overtaken chocolate as the most popular snack, though the average household still consumed chocolate weekly, with one study finding that the average Japanese consumer was purchasing 1.37 chocolate products each week.

=== Introduction of foreign customs ===
From the late 1950s, companies had again tried introducing Valentine's Day to Japan. By this time, Valentine's Day was little observed, and when it was, it was seen as an opportunity to give cards and gifts to loved ones, regardless of gender. Presents included clothing and stocks, and into the 1960s, pharmaceutical companies advertisements promoted vitamin drinks as gifts for the day. The first to try reintroducing the link between chocolate and Valentine's was Mary Chocolate Company in 1958. Though their efforts initially produced little in the way of sales, they were joined by other chocolate companies in the 1960s.

At the end of the 1960s, white chocolate entered Japan. Rokkatei Confectionery was the first to sell the new chocolate in 1968, though sale was restricted to Hokkaido and was unpopular. In the 1970s, Japanese National Railways launched the Discover Japan campaign. As young backpackers travelled to Hokkaido and tasted white chocolate for the first time, they spread it across Japan. In 1973, Kit Kat was introduced in Japan (see Kit Kats in Japan). The 1970s were also a turning point in attitudes towards Valentine's. In 1970, newspapers and advertising began framing the day around women having an opportunity to express their feelings to men. This immediately had an impact on practice, and the day became widely observed. To provide a setting for women to receive reciprocal gifts from men, a new holiday, White Day, was set a month later in the 1980s.

=== 1980s onwards ===
In 1984 estimates of chocolate consumption by region, Japan dominated consumption figures for Asia. As of the 1990s, little dark chocolate was eaten, as bitter flavours were generally eschewed in the Japanese diet. Accordingly, the milk chocolates that were eaten were sweeter than those outside of Japan.

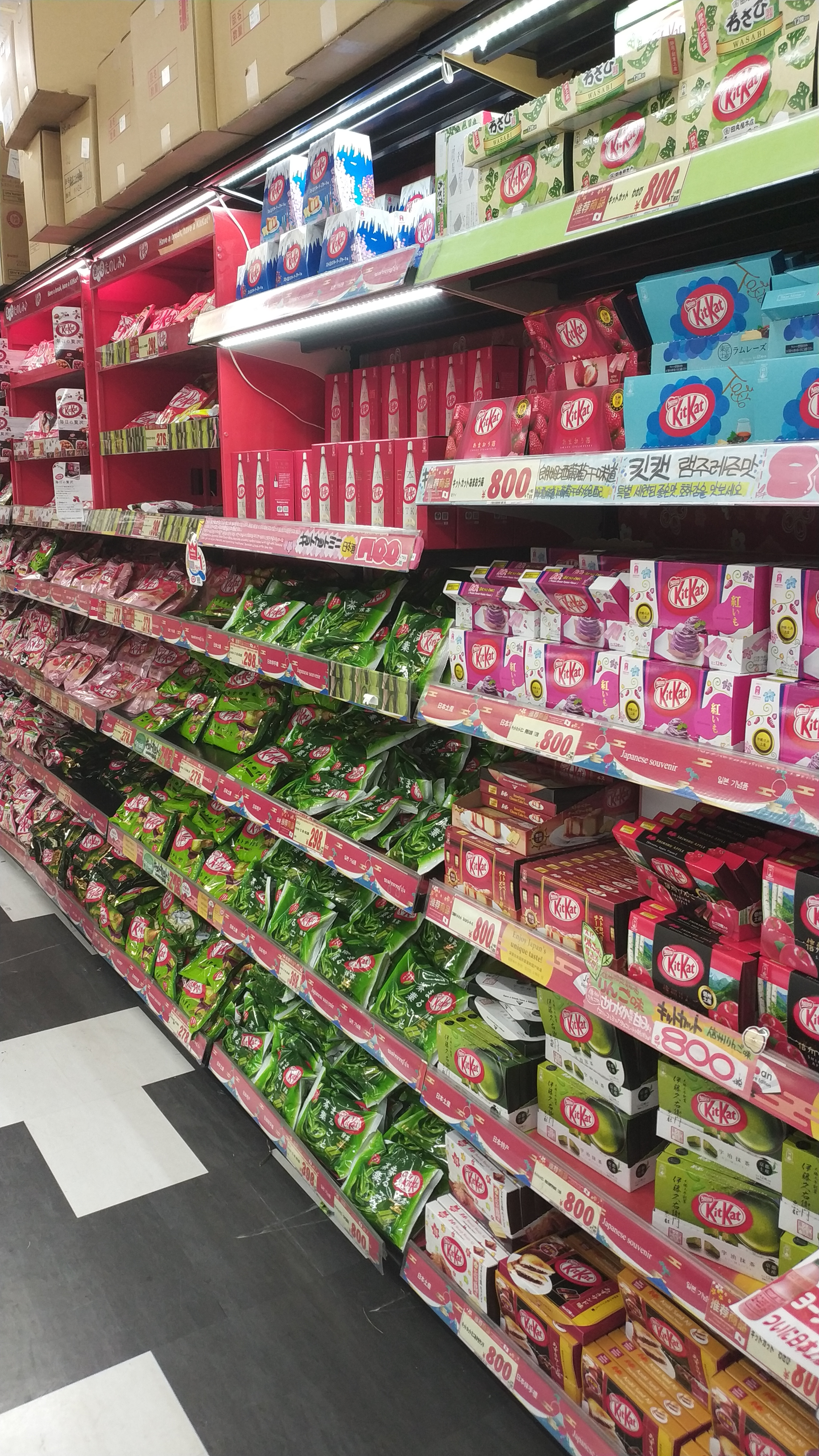
Kit Kats on display in Osaka

Nestlé Japan began selling a wide range of Kit Kat flavors at the beginning of the 21st century. At the time, strawberry was a particularly popular flavor in Japan, and it was used as the first flavor. By 2018 almost 400 variations of Kit Kat had been sold. Bright packaging, sale of some products restricted to specific regions and limited-time sales encouraged collecting practices. Products were sold across a range of commercial contexts, including specialty stores, with the most popular format being the "mini". The sale of different Kit Kats in different regions—shōyu (soy sauce) in Tokyo, wasabi in Shizuoka—with packaging resembling a postcard to facilitate mailing, made the products an attractive cheaper gift for omiyage.

As of 2012, chocolate made up 42% of the Japanese confectionery market, constituting a dominant part of chocolate consumption throughout Asia. Lotte and Meiji were the largest producers. By the end of the decade, Meiji and Glico were the largest chocolate companies in Japan by sales. Japan was the largest consumer in Asia of craft chocolate products, and was among the largest worldwide.

== Holidays ==
Chocolate consumption in Japan is concentrated around Christmas, Valentine's Day and White Day. This division of holidays persists. On Valentine's Day, women distribute giri choco to co-workers, particularly those in positions of seniority.

== See also ==
- Cocoa production in Japan
- List of Japanese desserts and sweets
- Sugar in Japan

== Sources ==
=== Books ===
- Goldstein, Darra, ed. (2015). The Oxford Companion to Sugar and Sweets. New York: Oxford University Press. ISBN 978-0-19-931339-6.
  - Rath, Eric C (2015a). "East Asia". In Goldstein (2015).
  - Rath, Eric C (2015b). "Japan". In Goldstein (2015).
- Holtzman, Jon D (2016). "Sweetness, Gender, and Identity in Japanese Culinary Culture". In Banerjee-Dube, Ishita (ed.). Cooking Cultures: Convergent Histories of Food and Feeling. New York: Cambridge University Press. ISBN 978-1-107-14036-3.
- Hosking, Richard (1996). A Dictionary of Japanese Food. Shinagawa-ku, Tokyo: Tuttle. ISBN 978-4-8053-1335-0.
- Kushner, Barak (2012). "Sweetness and Empire: Sugar Consumption in Imperial Japan". In Francks, Penelope; Hunter, Janet (eds.). The Historical Consumer: Consumption and Everyday Life in Japan, 1850-2000. Basingstoke, Hampshire: Palgrave Macmillan. ISBN 978-1-349-32413-2.
- Mitsuda, Tatsuya (2017). "'Sweets Reimagined': The Construction of Confectionary Identities, 1890–1930". In Niehaus, Andreas; Walravens, Tine (eds.). Feeding Japan: The Cultural and Political Issues of Dependency and Risk. Palgrave Macmillan Cham. ISBN 978-3-319-50552-7.
- Mitsuda, Tatsuya (2019). "Snacking, Health, Modernity". In Leung, Angela Ki Che; Caldwell, Melissa L; Ku, Robert Ji-Song; Yano, Christine R (eds.). Moral Foods: The Construction of Nutrition and Health in Modern Asia. University of Hawaii Press. doi:10.1515/9780824879570. ISBN 978-0-8248-7957-0.
- Mitsuda, Tatsuya (Winter 2021). "Consumed by Sweets: Parents, Children, and Snacking in Modern Japan". Journal of the History of Childhood and Youth. 14 (1). doi:10.1353/hcy.2021.0009.
- Nuttall, C; Hart, W A (1994). "Chocolate marketing and other aspects of the confectionery industry worldwide". In Beckett, Stephen T (ed.). Beckett's Industrial Chocolate Manufacture and Use (2nd ed.). West Sussex, UK: Springer Science+Business Media. ISBN 978-1-4613-5879-4.
- Rath, Eric C (2016). Japan's Cuisines: Food, Place and Identity. London: Reaktion Books. ISBN 978-1-78023-643-8.
- Smil, Vaclav; Kobayashi, Kazuhiko (2012). Japan's Dietary Transition and Its Impacts. Cambridge, Massachusetts: The MIT Press. ISBN 978-0-262-01782-4.
- Steinberg, Marc (2012). Anime's Media Mix: Franchising Toys and Characters in Japan. Minneapolis, Minnesota: University of Minnesota Press. ISBN 978-0-8166-7549-4.

=== Journals ===
- Cadby, Jeana; Araki, Tetsuya (March 2022). "The recent rise of craft chocolate in Japan: A 2019 snapshot". Journal of Agriculture and Food Research. 7 100273. doi:10.1016/j.jafr.2022.100273.
- Hashimoto, Rie (February 2019). "北海道スイーツ企業の売上高推移と上位企業の戦略の方向性" [Trends in Sales of Hokkaido Sweets Companies and Strategies of Top Sales Companies]. 北海商科大学論集 (in Japanese). 8 (1). Archived (PDF) from the original on June 1, 2025.
- Maekawa, Shiori (2025). "明治製菓『スヰート』 : 洋菓子の「清新な」味わいのデザインとブランド戦略の萌芽". デザイン理論. 86. doi:10.18910/102491.
- Minowa, Yuko; Khomenko, Olga; Belk, Russell W (8 September 2010). "Social Change and Gendered Gift-Giving Rituals: A Historical Analysis of Valentine's Day in Japan". Journal of Macromarketing. 31 (1). doi:10.1177/0276146710375831.
- Mitsuda, Tatsuya (2014). "From Reception to Acceptance: Chocolate in Japan, c. 1870–1935". Food & History. 12 (1). doi:10.1484/J.FOOD.5.105148.

=== Other ===
- Rao, Tejal (24 October 2018). "In Japan, the Kit Kat Isn't Just a Chocolate. It's an Obsession". The New York Times Magazine.
