= Kinoko no yama =

Japanese snack food

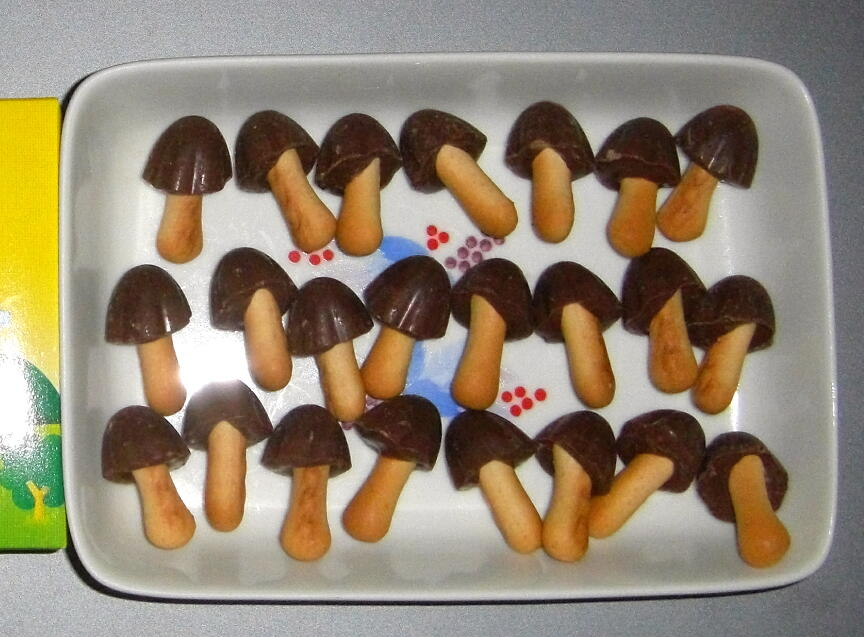
Kinoko no yama laid out on a plate, with the package at left.

Kinoko no yama (きのこの山), branded as Chocorooms in the United States, is a Japanese snack food produced by Meiji Seika. It is made in the shape of little mushrooms. Kinoko means "mushroom" and yama means "mountain". The "stem" of the mushroom is made of a biscuit-type cookie and the top is made of chocolate. Although chocolate is the most common flavor, it may come in many other flavors.

It was first sold in 1975.

There is a longtime conflict between Kinoko no yama and another Meiji product, Takenoko no sato, with millions voting in "elections" between the two.

== See also ==
- Chocolate in Japan
- Kinoko no yama vs Takenoko no sato
