= Kinoko no yama vs Takenoko no sato =

Japanese snack debate

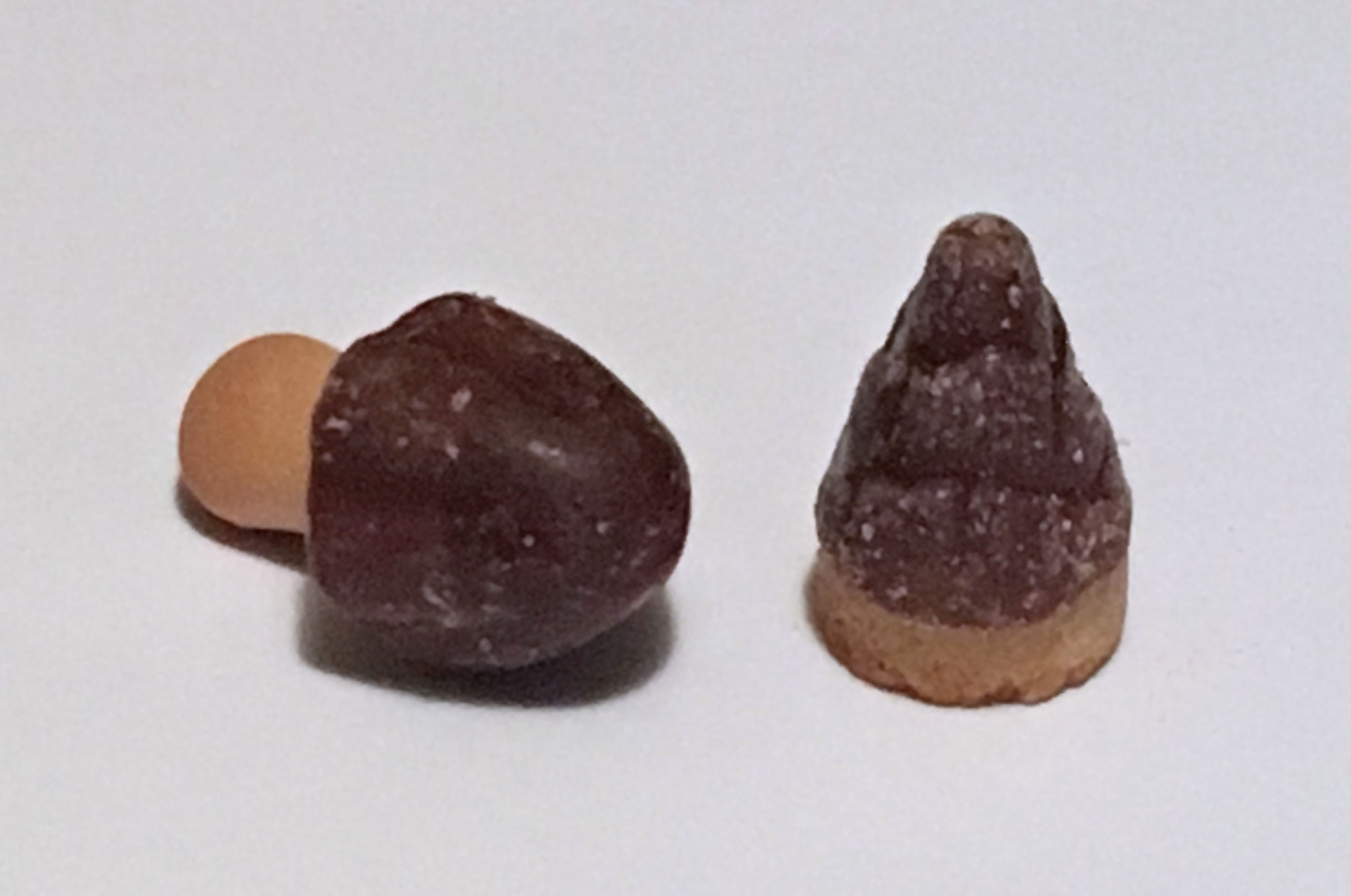
Chocorooms (Kinoko no yama) and Chococones (Takenoko no sato)

Kinoko vs Takenoko (Japanese: きのこたけのこ戦争, Hepburn: Kinoko-Takenoko Sensō; lit. 'Kinoko-Takenoko War') is a debate between consumers over which one of Kinoko no yama and Takenoko no sato (branded as Chocorooms and Chococones respectively in the United States), both made by Meiji Co., is better. This trend of comparing the two products began from the 1980s and has become an Internet meme in the 21st century. Meiji has held several votes to decide which chocolate is better, with Takenoko no sato winning most of the votes. According to a survey by Meiji Co., older generations tend to prefer Kinoko no yama.

== Background ==
In 1975, Meiji Co. released Kinoko no yama using some of the production lines that were used for a different chocolate, Apollo. Meiji then released its successor, Takenoko no sato, following the success of Kinoko no yama in 1979. Due to the similarity of the two products, minor conflicts started in 1980 comparing the products. Meiji Co. held a popularity contest across Japan following Kinoko no yama's drop in sales in 2001. In the first contest, Takenoko no sato won, and the sales of both chocolates increased.

== Viral spread ==
With the spread of the Internet, each side began supporting its favored product on social media platforms such as Twitter. Several athletes and celebrities, such as Saori Yoshida, took part by supporting a side. Internet users developed backstories and spread "violent" images of war between the two pieces of candy, with the question of which of the two chocolates a Japanese person prefers being joked as a "forbidden question".

== Results of votes ==
- Unofficial voting events are excluded.

| Voting events | Year | Kinoko no yama votes | Takenoko no sato votes | Winner | Citations |
|---|---|---|---|---|---|
| 1st Kinoko-Takenoko National Vote | 2001 | About 450,000 | About 550,000 | Takenoko no sato | |
| 2nd Kinoko-Takenoko National Vote | 2018 | 6,761,773 (Note: The "both" option received 2,238,204 votes.) | 6,931,220 | Takenoko no sato | |
| 3rd Kinoko-Takenoko National Vote | 2019 | 6,021,986 | 4,565,799 | Kinoko no yama | |

== Aftermath ==
After the 2019 public vote, both sides' leaders signed a peace treaty canonically putting an end to 40 years of conflict. Despite the campaigns, Chococones still surpass Chocorooms in sale for the last three decades, even when adding Chocorooms' foreign sales. Although Chococones are usually not sold outside of Japan as of 2025, an event that took place in the Saudi Anime Expo in 2022 showed that the participants preferred Chococones.
