= Taichirō =

- Gender: Male

Origin
- Origin: Japanese
- Meaning: Different meanings depending on the kanji used

Taichirō, Taichiro or Taichirou (written: 太一郎) is a masculine Japanese given name. Notable people with the name include:

- Taichirō Hirokawa (広川 太一郎; 1940–2008), Japanese voice actor
- Taichirō Koga (古賀 太一郎; born 1989), Japanese volleyball player
- Taichiro Morinaga (1865–1937), Japanese businessman
