= Meiji Co. =

Japanese food company

Meiji Co., Ltd.

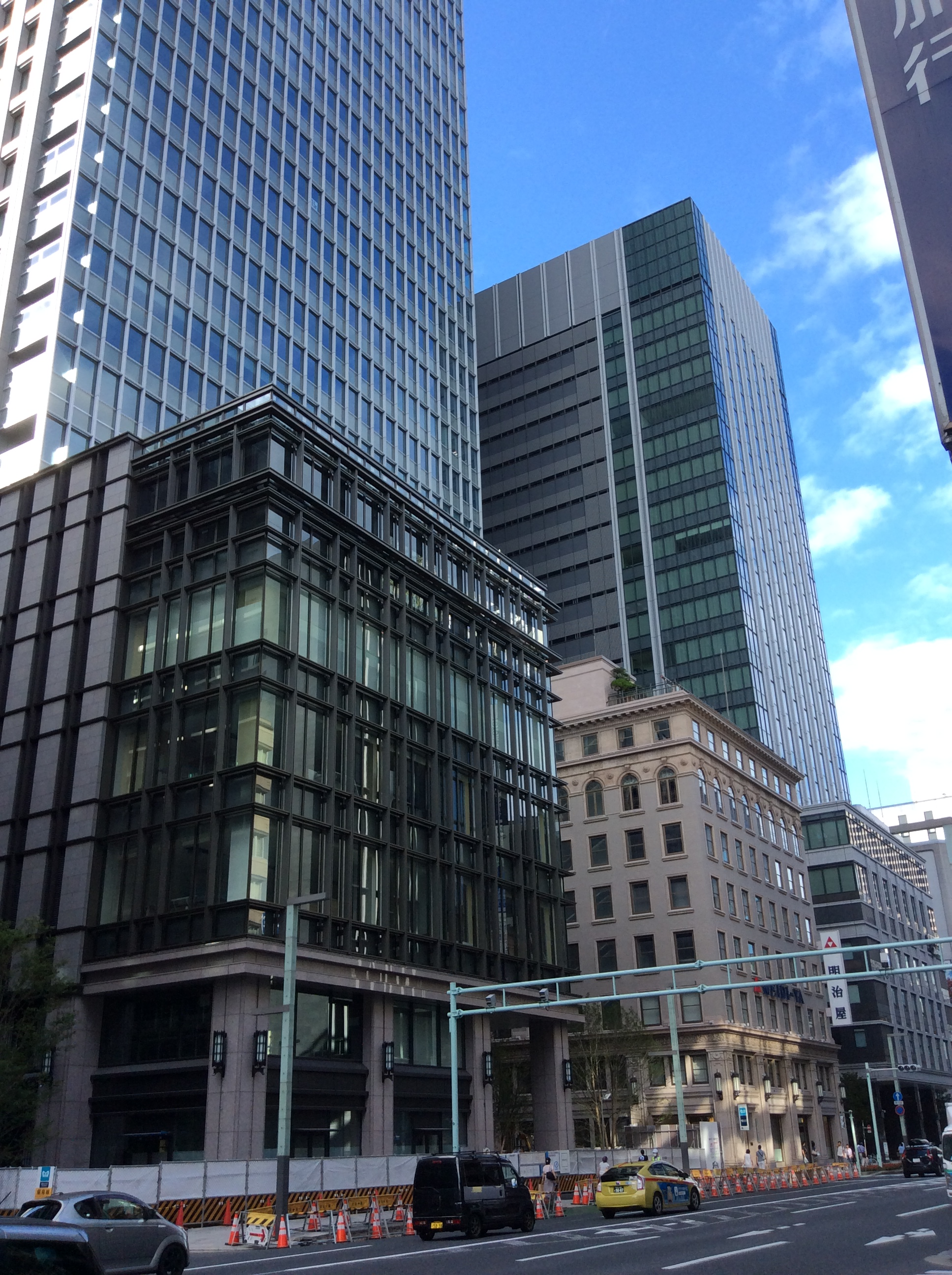
- Headquarters in Kyobashi Edogrand
- Native name: 株式会社明治
- Romanized name: Kabushiki-gaisha Meiji
- Formerly: Kyokuto Condensed Milk Co., Ltd. (1917-1924); Meiji Dairies Corporation (1924-2011)
- Type: Subsidiary
- Industry: Food
- Predecessor: Kyokutō Rennyū; Meiji Seika
- Founded: 21 December 1917; 108 years ago
- Headquarters: Kyōbashi, Chūō, Tokyo, Japan
- Revenue: 727,838,000,000 yen (2020)
- Parent: Meiji Holdings
- Website: www.meiji.co.jp/english/

Meiji Co., Ltd. (株式会社明治, Kabushiki-gaisha Meiji), formerly Meiji Dairies Corporation (明治乳業株式会社, Meiji Nyūgyō Kabushiki-gaisha), is a Japanese food company. It was established in 1917 as a dairy company.

Apart from dairy products like milk, ice cream, and cheese, its lineup includes sports drinks, pizza, chocolate bars and food supplements. The company manufactures confectionery products including Hello Panda and Yan Yan. Its competitors include Ezaki Glico, Kabaya, Lotte Confectionery, and Morinaga.

On 1 April 2009, Meiji Seika and Meiji Dairies established the holding company Meiji Holdings, which is a constituent of the Nikkei 225 index. Two years later, Meiji Dairies took over the food and healthcare business of Meiji Seika and became a food company under the legal name Meiji Co., Ltd.

It operates CP-Meiji, a joint venture with Charoen Pokphand in Thailand that was founded on 1 February 1989, and produces and markets dairy products including pasteurized milk and yogurt.

On 6 December 2011, radioactive caesium was detected in batches of Meiji Step baby formula made in March 2011. Meiji said the levels were within safe limits and did not pose a health risk. Tests found caesium-134 at up to 15.2 becquerels per kilogram and caesium-137 at up to 16.5 becquerels per kilogram, below Japan’s limit of 200 becquerels per kilogram for infant milk and dairy products. The company voluntarily recalled 400,000 cans of the product.

In the United States, Meiji operates through Meiji America Inc., which owns Stauffer’s, a cookie and cracker manufacturer based in York, Pennsylvania.

In October 2026, Meiji agreed to sell its wholly owned subsidiary Nihon Kanzume, a Hokkaido-based producer of frozen vegetables and retort foods, to Yoshimura Food Holdings for an undisclosed sum. The transfer was scheduled for 1 November, following a recapitalisation by Meiji.

== See also ==
- Chocolate in Japan
- Meiji Seika
