= Morozoff Ltd. =

Japanese bakery and confectionery company

Morozoff Limited モロゾフ株式会社
- Type: Public K.K.
- Traded as: TYO: 2217; Osaka SE:2217
- Industry: Food industry
- Founded: Kobe, Japan (August 8, 1931)
- Founder: Fyodor Dmitriyevich Morozov
- Headquarters: 5-3, Nishi, Koyo-cho, Higashinada-ku, Kobe, Hyōgo Prefecture 658-0033, Japan
- Number of locations: 952 stores (as of September 30, 2012)
- Area served: Japan
- Key people: Yuichi Kawakita (Chairman); Shinji Yamaguchi (President)
- Products: Pudding; Cheese cake; Chocolate; Cookies; Baked sweets; Ice cream
- Services: Confectionery manufacturing and selling; Candy retail stores; Cafe shops; Restaurants
- Revenue: ▲US$ 271.48 million (FY 2013) (¥ 27.92 billion) (FY 2013)
- Net income: ▲US$ 4.56 million (FY 2013) (¥ 469.81 million) (FY 2013)
- Number of employees: 749 (as of September 31, 2012)
- Website: Official website (in Japanese)

Morozoff Limited (モロゾフ株式会社, Morozofu Kabushiki Gaisha) is a confectionery and cake company headquartered in Kobe, Japan. Since its founding in 1931 by Fyodor Dmitriyevich Morozov, a white emigre from Russia, Morozoff has grown and now has 952 restaurants and cafes across Japan.

Morozoff is also well known in Japan as the company that first introduced Valentine's Day to the nation. In 1936 it ran an advertisement in the Japan Advertiser (a publication catering to foreigners) with the phrase, “For your Valentine, Make A Present of Morozoff’s Fancy Box Chocolates”. However, it wasn't until after World War II in the 1950s and '60s when the department stores and other manufacturers caught on that Valentine's Day truly became a national phenomenon.

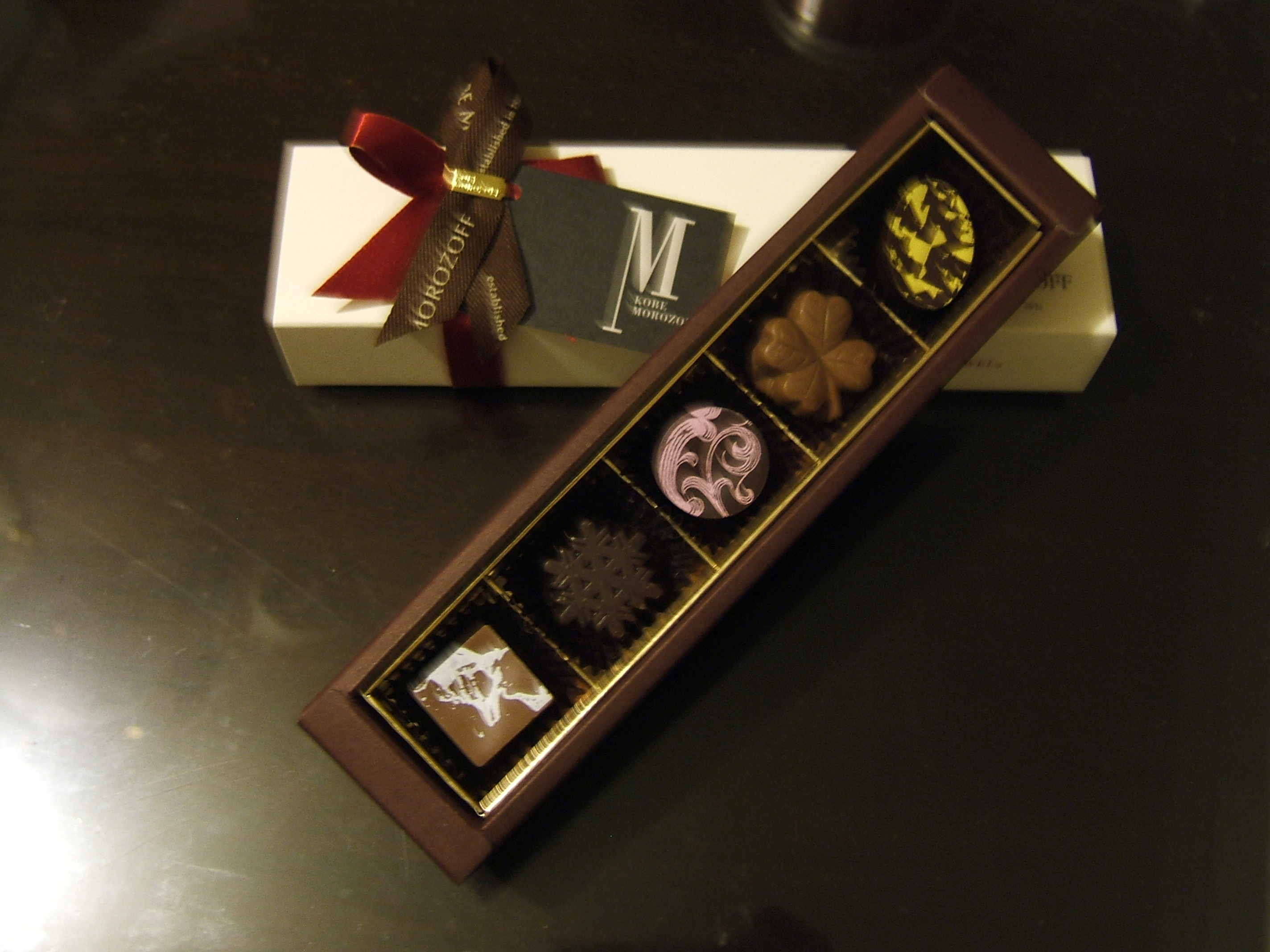
Morozoff Jewel Chocolate

== See also ==
- Chocolate in Japan
