= Yan Yan (snack) =

Japanese biscuit snack

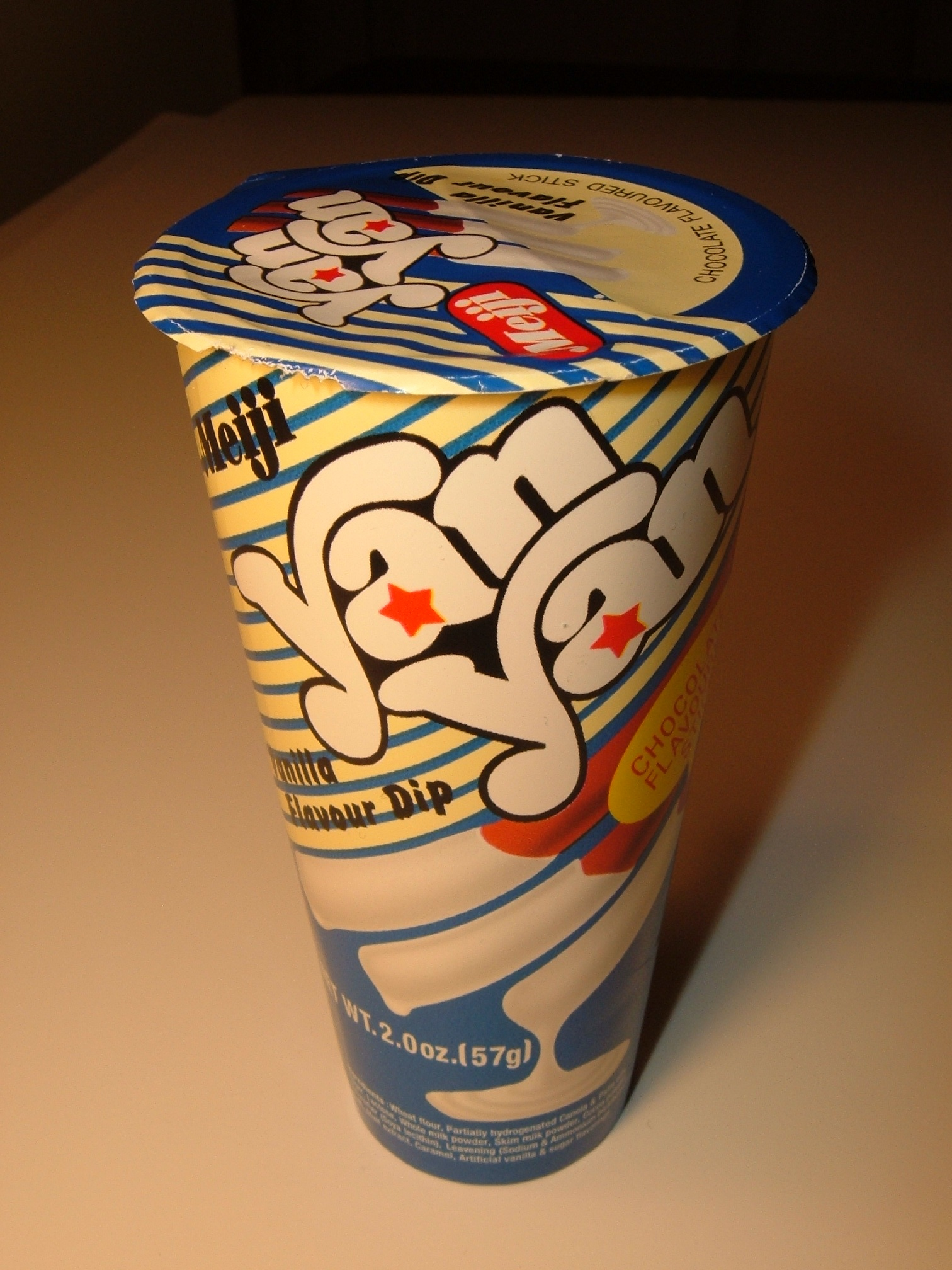
Yan Yan with chocolate sticks and vanilla dip

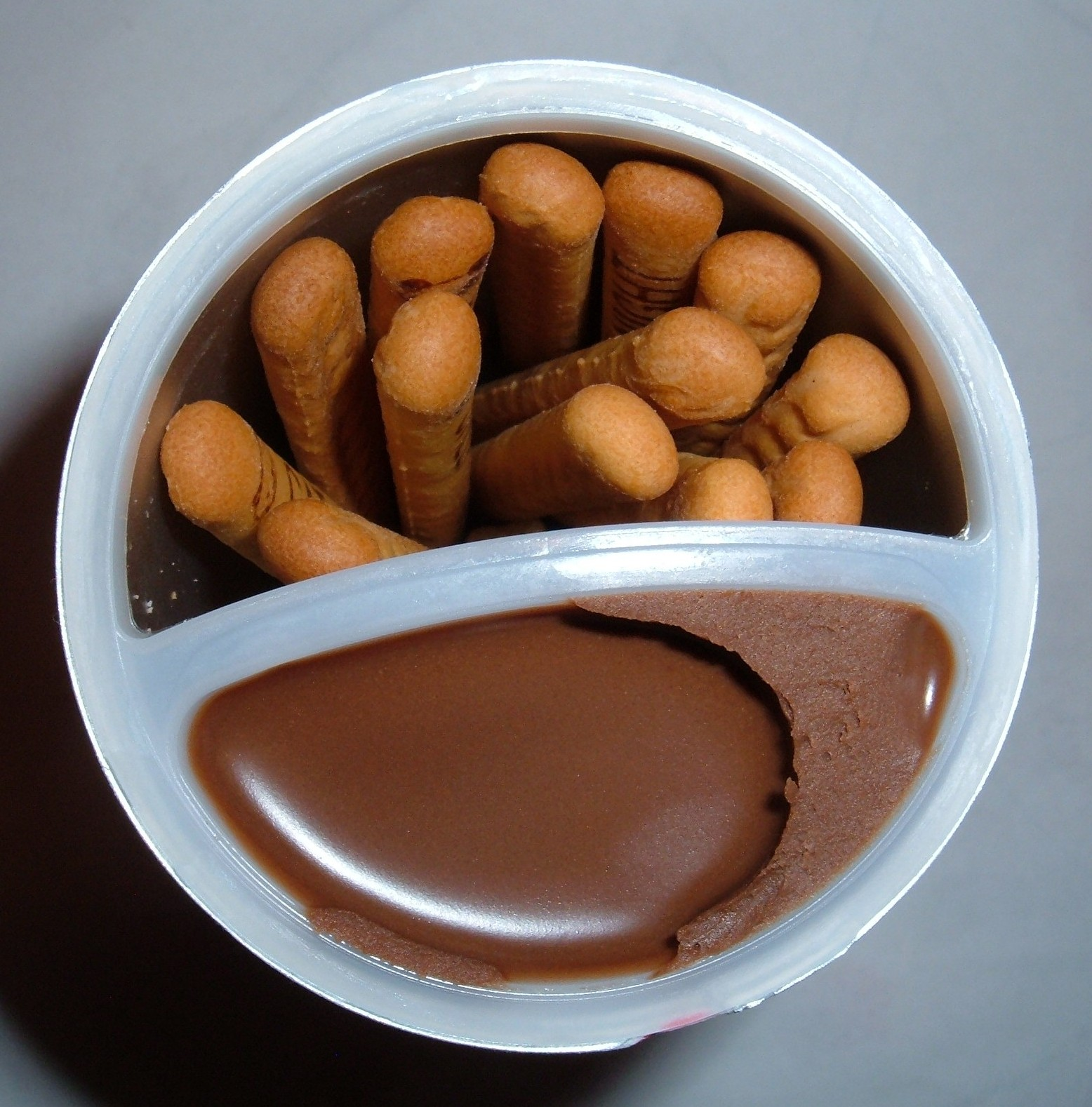
A package of regular Yan Yan

Yan Yan (ヤンヤンつけボー, Yan Yan Tsukebō) is a Japanese snack food made by Meiji Seika since 1979. It comes in a package with two compartments. One side has biscuit sticks (which can be sometimes called cracker sticks), the other side has chocolate, strawberry, vanilla, or yogurt flavored frosting used for dipping. The sticks themselves may also be flavored. Some Yan Yan products are sold in rectangular containers with 9 sticks and dip. There is also a new version which includes two flavored dips.

In 1982, British company KP Snacks began licensing Yan Yan for UK markets releasing it under the name Choc Dips.

== The sticks ==
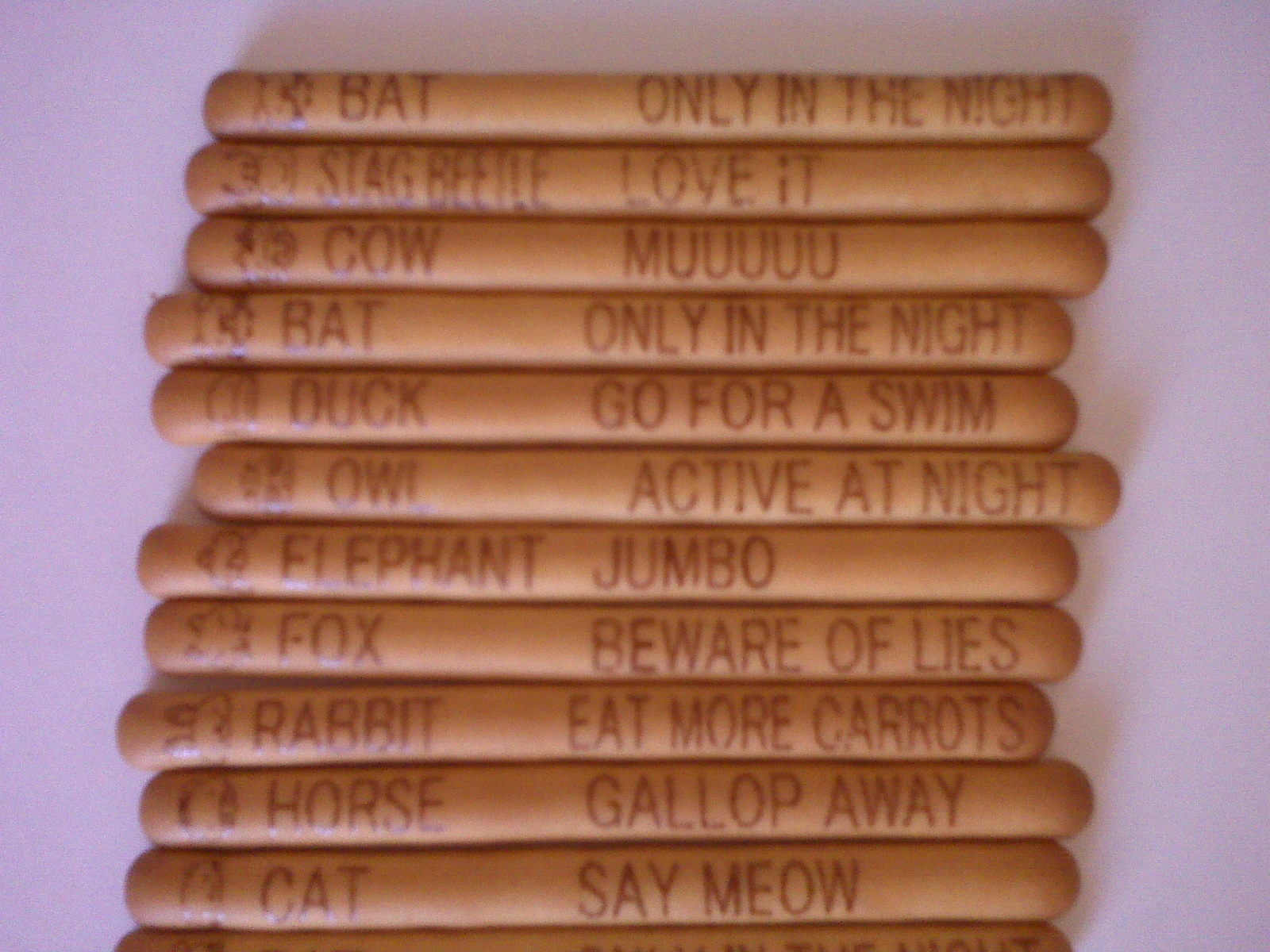
Messages on yan yan sticks

The sticks were once plain, but Meiji later printed pictures of various animals on them with quotes relating to that animal. The quotes are in English, but often appear unorthodox to native English speakers. Examples of these animal quotes include:

- Balloon: Goes Pop
- Bat: Only In The Night / Flying Mammal
- Beetle: Thick Shiny Shell / Lucky Color: Brown
- Butterfly: Flower to Flower
- Cat: Has Nine Lives / Say Meow
- Chick: Eager to Hatch / Lucky Color: Yellow
- Chicken: Kokekokko / Cluck Cluck
- Cow: Muuuuu
- Duck: Go For A Swim / Quack, Quack
- Elephant: Jumbo / Longest Nose
- Fox: Beware Of Lies / Cunning And Sly
- Frog: Amphibian / Ribbit
- Giraffe: Tallest Mammal / Longest Neck
- Goat: You Are Lucky Today / Don't Feed Paper
- Grown Baby: Cradle Them All
- Horse: Gallop Away / My "Neigh"bor
- Kettle: Goes Ssss
- Lion: Roar
- Mole: In A Hole / Born to Dig
- Mouse: Eats Cheese / Do Not Be Timid
- Octopus: Eight Arms / Lucky Number: 8
- Owl: Active At Night / Night Predator
- Panda: Go for More / Loves Bamboo
- Rabbit: Eat More Carrots
- Rhinoceros: Think Big / Nose Horn
- Seal: Loves To Sun Tan / Barks Underwater
- Sheep: Wool Sweaters
- Snail: Snail Mail? / Slow Mail
- Squid: Black Ink
- Squirrel: Your Best Friend / Nut Burrower
- Stag Beetle: Love It / Powerful Jaw
- Starfish: Star in the Sea / Star+Fish / Sea Star
- Whale: Biggesy Mammal (Typo: Should be "Biggest Mammal") / Largest Mammal
- Zebra: Herbivore / Fancy Stripes

Some of the animal-related quotes relate not to facts about the animals, but instead to the noise the animal makes, which is printed in a Japanese-influenced English dialect. For example:

- Chicken: Kokekokko
- Cow: Muuuuu

There are also two "golden" non-animal quotes: Golden Egg and Golden Log.

== Flavors ==
Yan Yan comes in a variety of flavors. This includes vanilla sticks with chocolate, strawberry, mango, purple yam, vanilla cream, and the newest, hazelnut, or chocolate sticks with vanilla cream.

== Similar snacks ==
Pocky is a similar Japanese snack which includes thinner sticks pre-dipped in cream. The cream comes in a much wider variety of flavors such as green tea cream or honey-flavored cream. Yan Yan is dipped by the consumer themselves, and comes in a more limited assortment of flavors. Meiji also produces another snack called Hello Panda. It is a panda-shaped biscuit with either chocolate, strawberry, vanilla, or matcha (green tea) flavored fillings. Yan Yan is also similar to the American snack Dunk-a-roos.

Nutella has a similar snack called Nutella & Go that includes breadsticks or pretzels for dipping into their signature hazelnut spread. It has similar packaging to Yan Yan, but Yan Yan is significantly taller while Nutella & Go is wider.
