= Meiji Holdings =

Japanese multinational holding company

Meiji Holdings Company, Ltd.

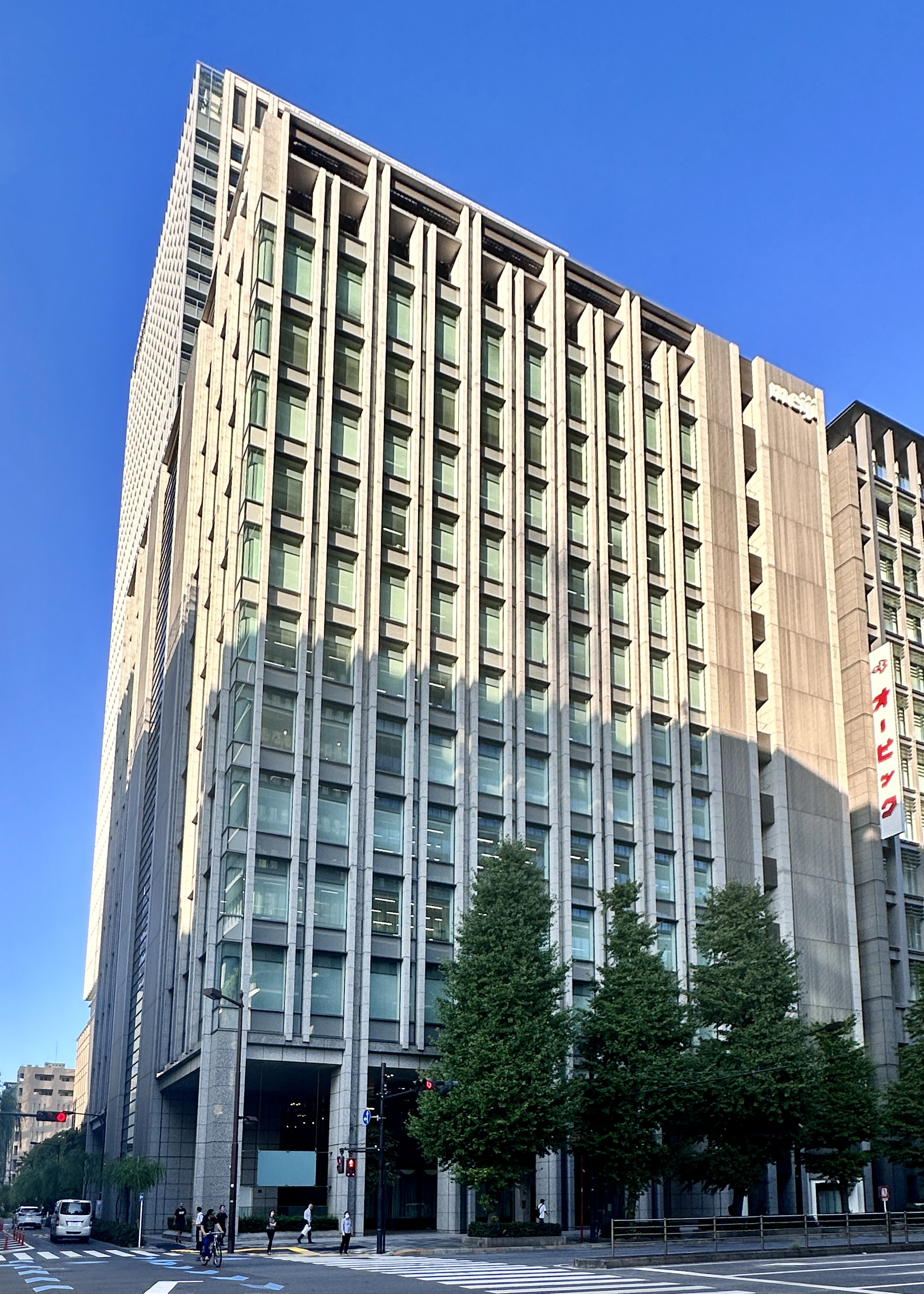
- Headquarters in Kyōbashi, Chūō, Tokyo
- Native name: 明治ホールディングス株式会社
- Romanized name: Meiji Hōrudingusu Kabushiki Gaisha
- Type: Public (K.K)
- Traded as: TYO: 2269
- Industry: Food; Pharmaceutical; Healthcare
- Founded: April 1, 2009; 17 years ago
- Founder: Meiji Seika; Meiji Co.
- Headquarters: 4-16, Kyobashi Nichome, Chuo, Tokyo, Japan
- Key people: Katsunari Matsuda (CEO, President & Chairman)
- Revenue: ▼¥1,252,706 million (consolidated, March 2020)
- Operating income: ▲¥102,708 million (consolidated, March 2020)
- Net income: ▲¥67,313 million (consolidated, March 2020)
- Total assets: ▼¥998,637 million (consolidated, March 2020)
- Total equity: ▲¥562,747 million (consolidated, March 2020)
- Subsidiaries: Meiji Seika; Meiji Dairies
- Website: www.meiji.com

Meiji Holdings Company, Ltd. (明治ホールディングス株式会社) is a Japanese holding company established on April 1, 2009, after the stock transfer from Meiji Seika and Meiji Dairies and is the fourth largest confectionery company in the world.

== Reorganization ==
Meiji Holdings held a press conference on September 14, 2010, and announced the reorganization of the Meiji Group. On April 1, 2011, Meiji Holdings reorganized Meiji Seika and Meiji Dairies to a food company, Meiji Co., Ltd., and a pharmaceutical company, Meiji Seika Pharma Co., Ltd.; Meiji Dairies took over the food and healthcare business of Meiji Seika to form Meiji Co., and Meiji Seika was renamed Meiji Seika Pharma Co., Ltd. According to the International Cocoa Organization, Meiji is the 9th largest confectionery producer in the world.
