= Hi-Chew =

Japanese fruit chew confectionary

- Japanese snack food
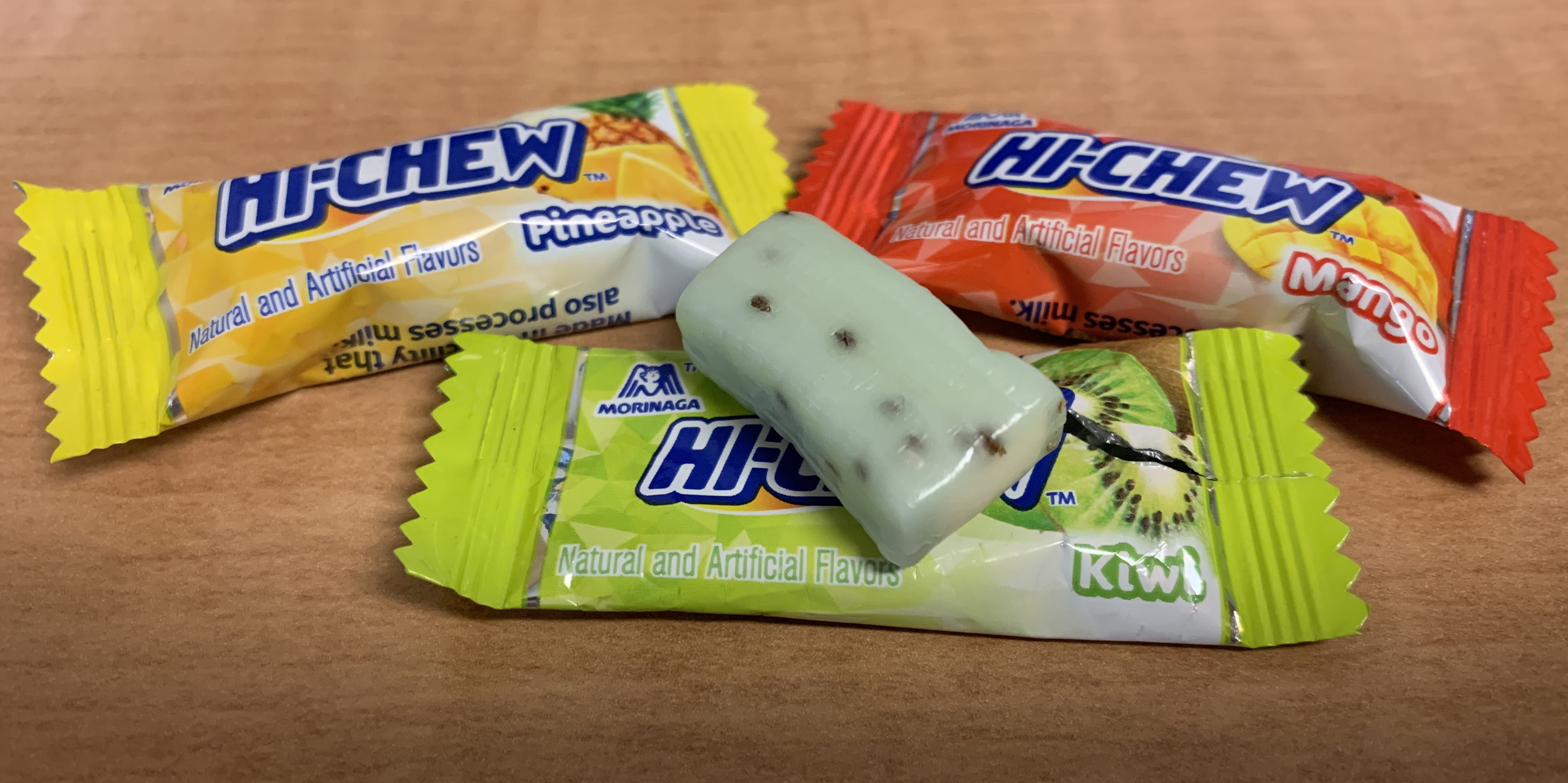
- Japanese name: ハイチュウ (haichū)
- Maker: Morinaga & Company
- Ingredients: Gelatin, fruit flavoring, sugar
- Flavours: Watermelon, strawberry, green apple, dragon fruit, mango, orange, grape, peach, banana, melon, cherry, kiwi, açai, pineapple, blueberry, raspberry, black cherry, lemon and passion fruit, rainbow sherbet, blue hawaii, blue raspberry, and cola

Hi-Chew (ハイチュウ, Haichū) is a brand of chewy candy made by the Japanese confectionary company Morinaga & Company. Introduced in 1975, Hi-Chew is known for its soft, elastic texture that is often described as being between chewing gum and soft taffy, and for its wide range of fruit and dessert-inspired flavors. Each piece typically consists of a flavored interior surrounded by a lighter outer layer.

Hi-Chew is sold across Asia, North America, Europe, and Oceania. It has become one of Morinaga’s flagship international brands, with more than 170 flavors having been released. In the United States, the brand has seen rapid growth since the 2010s, supported by expanded distribution, marketing partnerships, and the opening of a domestic production facility in North Carolina in 2016.

== Origin ==
The origins of Hi-Chew trace back to the 1930s, when Morinaga & Co. founder Taichiro Morinaga conceived of creating an edible alternative to chewing gum that would avoid the Japanese taboo against removing food from one's mouth in public. In 1931, Morinaga & Co. developed a candy called Chewlets by combining chewy caramel with fruit flavorings. Although World War II brought the business to a halt, the company rebuilt itself after the war, and Chewlets evolved into the Hi-Chew format that the company introduced in 1975.

== Description ==
Hi-Chew candies are individually wrapped in logo-stamped foil or plain white wax paper (depending on the location). Each individual candy piece has an outer white coating (the same for most flavors) and a colored, flavored interior. Exceptions to the rule are the Strawberry Cheesecake, Yogurt, Cotton Candy, Sweet and Sour Mix, Superfruit Mix, and Fantasy Mix flavors, which have a colored outer coating with a white, flavored inside, whereas the Cola-flavored Hi-Chews are brown.

The texture is similar to a cross between chewing gum and fruit-flavored candies in the United States and other western countries, such as the German brand Mamba or the British brand Starburst. Hi-Chew is sold in many countries around the world, including Taiwan, China, Singapore, Hong Kong, South Korea, the United States, the United Kingdom, South Africa, Australia and New Zealand.

Special editions are sometimes released, normally focusing on a specific fruit farmed in Japan and the location where they are grown; examples include Seto Inland Sea lemon and Okinawan Shikuwasa.

Beginning in 2012, Hi-Chew became a gluten-free product. Although the candy never actually contained gluten ingredients, it had been processed in factories that processed gluten. It contains gelatin ingredients derived from pork, so it is not halal, kosher, vegetarian, or vegan.

Hi-Chew's ingredients include glucose syrup, sugar, hydrogenated palm kernel oil, gelatin, natural and artificial flavors, strawberry juice from concentrate, DL-malic acid, citric acid, emulsifiers, sodium lactate solution, and natural colors (beta-carotene, carmine). It may contain soybeans. The product also may be processed in facilities which use dairy products.

== In the United States ==
After seeing increased sales in Salt Lake City in the early 2010s attributed to Latter-Day Saint missionaries who had visited Japan, Hi-Chew began a marketing campaign with Major League Baseball players. U.S. sales grew from $8 million in 2012 to more than $100 million in 2021.

Hi-Chew is available in many flavors in the United States, including:

- candy apple,
- strawberry ice cream,
- key lime pie,
- Blue Hawaii (a citrus and pineapple flavor),
- blue raspberry,
- rainbow sherbet,
- raspberry, blueberry,
- black cherry,
- watermelon,
- green apple,
- dragon fruit,
- strawberry,
- grapefruit,
- kiwi,
- mango,
- grape,
- lemon,
- açai,
- cola,
- ramune,
- banana,
- plain yogurt,
- blueberry yogurt,
- strawberry yogurt,
- lilikoi,
- pineapple

Hi-Chew Sours and Hi-Chew Bites were released in February 2016. Hi-Chew Sours flavors include lemon, watermelon, and grapefruit. Hi-Chew combos contain two flavor blends, tropical smoothie (passionfruit plus mango) and piña colada (pineapple plus coconut). Hi-Chew plus fruit contain two flavors plus real fruit bits: orange plus tangerine and red apple plus strawberry. Hi-Chew Bites are soft chew candy blended with already established flavors, "grape and strawberry" and "mango and orange". Since its inception, over 170 flavors of Hi-Chew have been created.

In 2016, Hi-Chew opened its first production factory in North Carolina.

In early 2018, Hi-Chew began a contest known as "East meets West"; user-submitted votes decide which of their Japanese line of flavors should be introduced to a Western audience. On April 11, 2018, Hi-Chew's Instagram account officially announced that dragon fruit had won the competition and would be coming to the United States the following year.

== Product recall ==
In 2008, Morinaga recalled some of its Hi-Chew products due to complaints that rubber-like material had been found in the candy. It was discovered that a piece of a worker's glove had fallen into a cooking vat at the Hyogo Morinaga factory. Some of the affected products had been exported to Hong Kong; the Centre for Food Safety monitored the situation there, warning the public against its purchase or consumption.

== See also ==
- Puccho (Spanish Wikipedia)
- Chewits
