= Kyobashi Edogrand =

- 京橋エドグラン
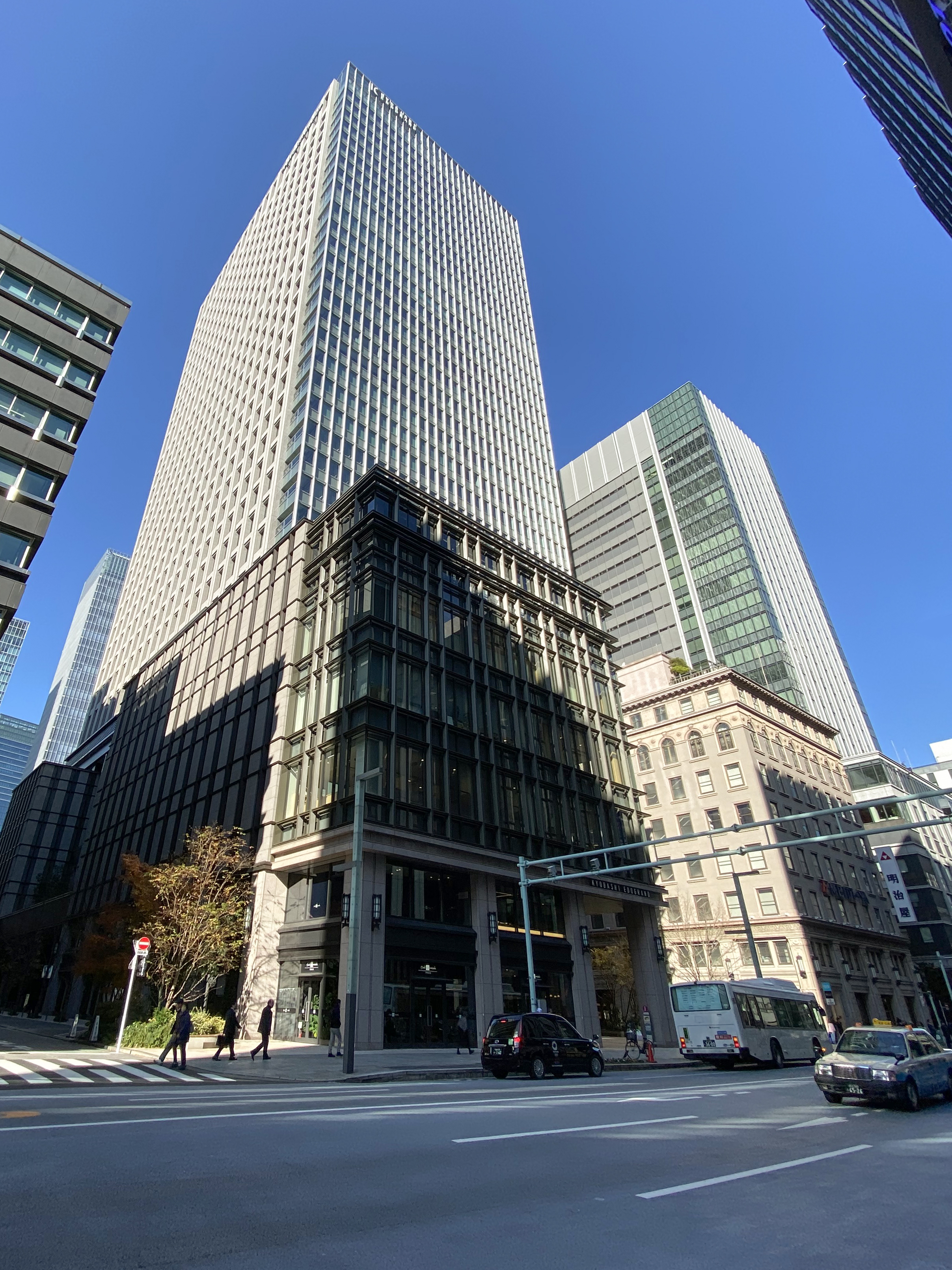

General information
- Status: Completed
- Type: Office, Retail, Public facilities
- Location: Chūō, Tokyo, Japan, 2-2-1 Kyobashi, Chūō, Tokyo
- Coordinates: 35°40′38.7″N 139°46′10.2″E
- Construction started: October 2, 2013
- Completed: October 2016
- Cost: Approximately ¥66.2 billion
- Owner: Kyobashi 2-chome West District Urban Redevelopment Association

Height
- Roof: 170.37 m (559.0 ft)

Technical details
- Structural system: Steel (partially steel-reinforced concrete and reinforced concrete); mid-story seismic isolation
- Floor count: 32 (+3 underground)
- Floor area: 119,040 m^{2} (1,281,300 sq ft)
- Lifts/elevators: 17

Design and construction
- Architect: Nikken Sekkei
- Developer: Nihon Tochi-Tatemono (lead developer); Tokyo Tatemono; Nikken Sekkei; Shimizu Corporation
- Main contractor: Shimizu Corporation joint venture

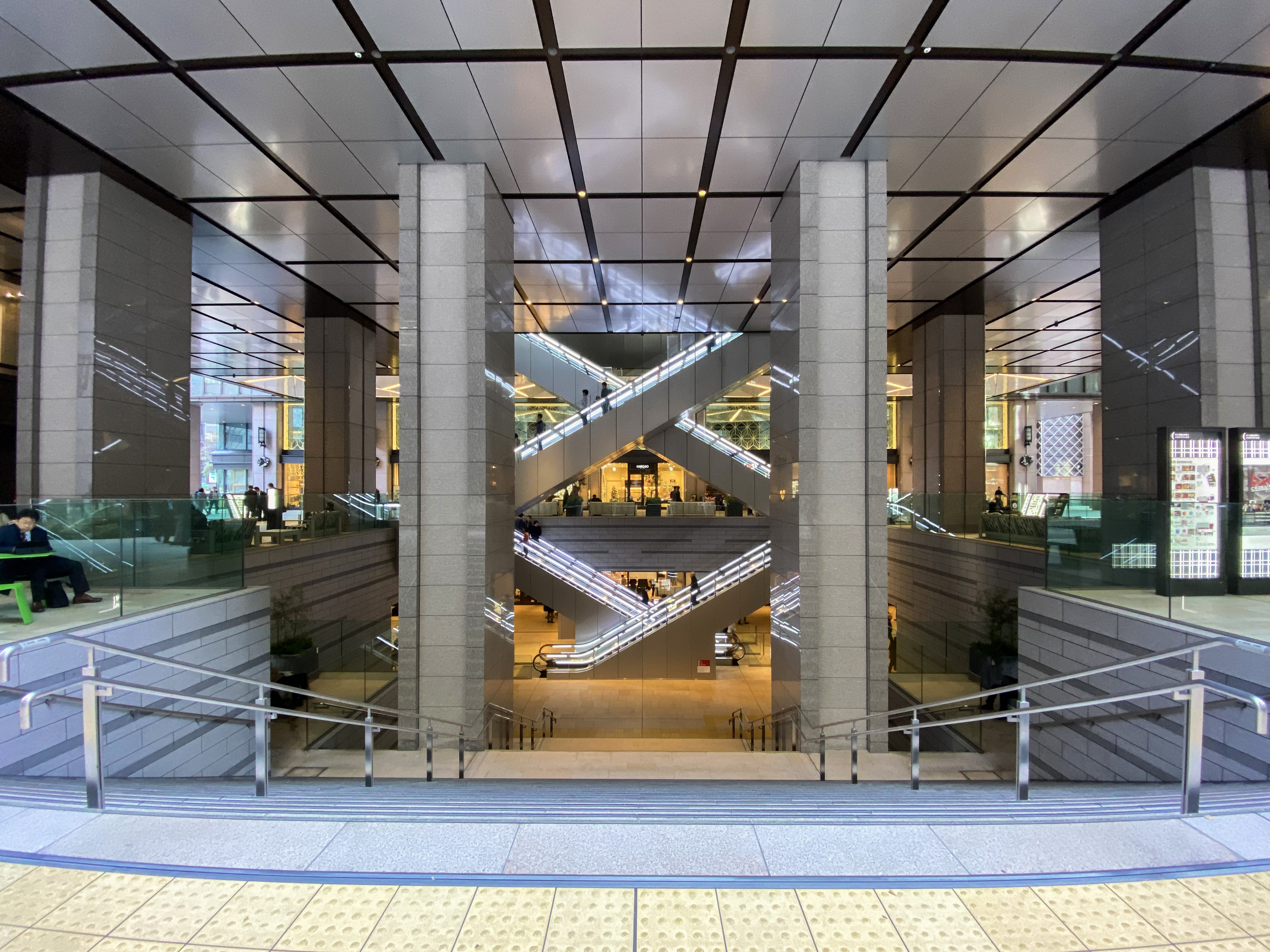
The large staircase on the first basement floor

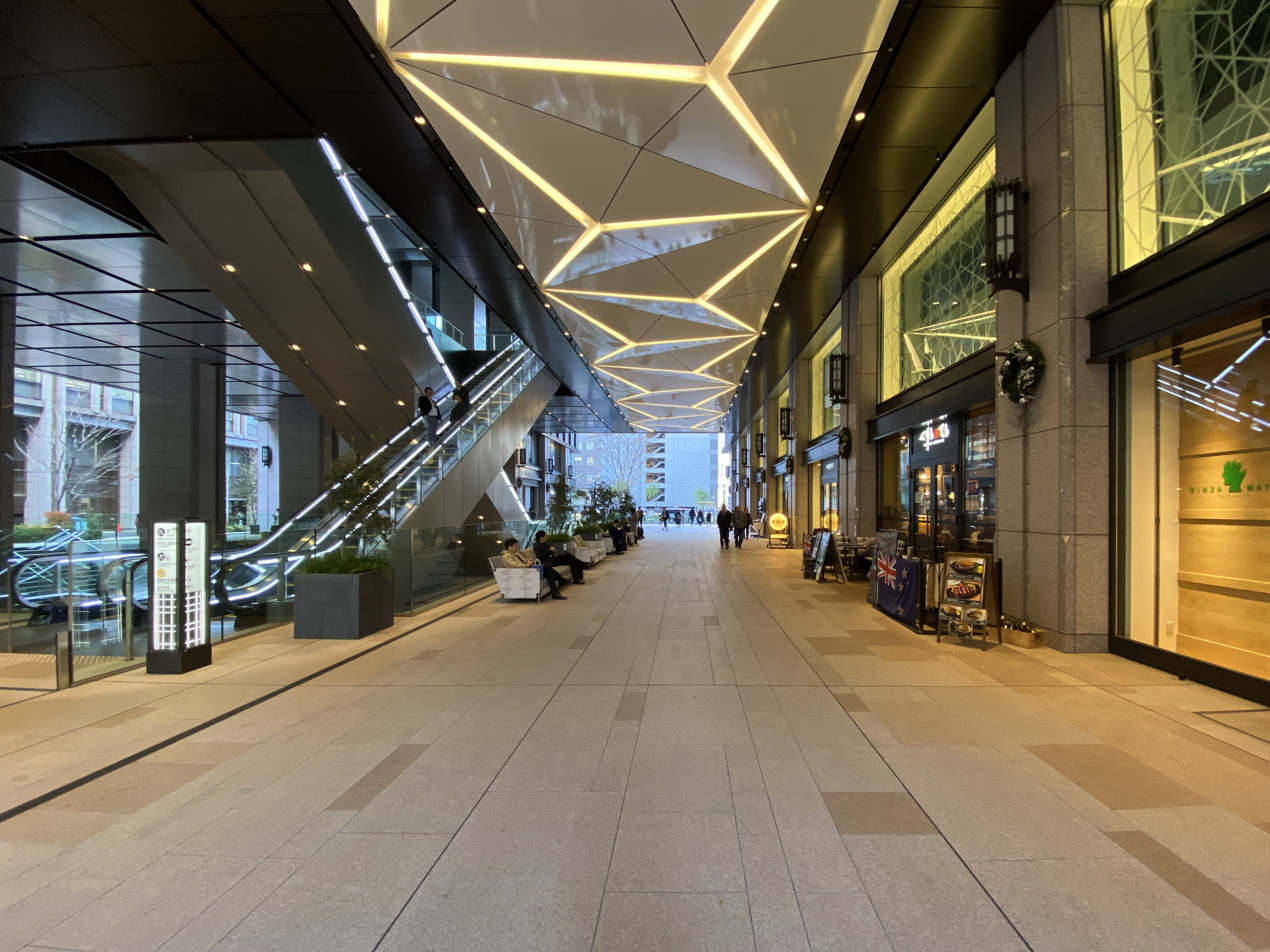
Kyobashi Central Square on the first floor (2019)

Kyobashi Edogrand (京橋エドグラン, Kyōbashi Edoguran) is a mixed-use complex developed as part of an urban redevelopment project on the former site of the Kyō Building and other properties in Kyobashi, Chūō, Tokyo, Japan, near Tokyo Station, Kyobashi Station, and Takaracho Station.

The complex houses offices, retail facilities, and public and community facilities. It opened on November 25, 2016.

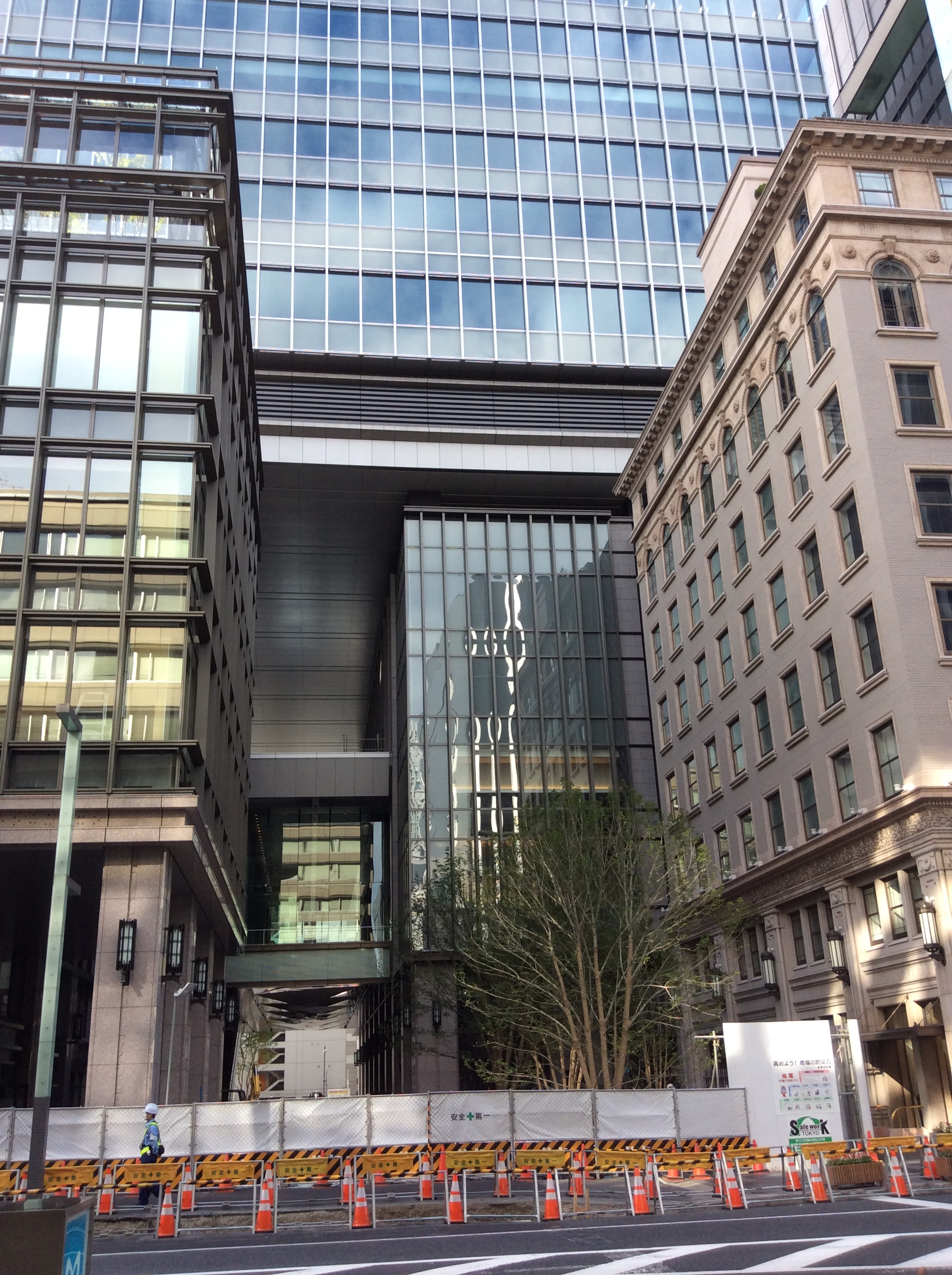
The redevelopment tower on the left, the lower floors of the historic building on the right, and the pedestrian passageway in the center, constructed following the closure of a Chūō Ward road (September 3, 2016)

== Overview ==
The complex is located in a prime location approximately a five-minute walk from Tokyo Station and directly connected to Kyobashi Station on the Tokyo Metro Ginza Line. In response to concerns over the aging of buildings in the area, more than 50 property owners established a town planning study group in 2001.

The project preserved and repurposed the historic Meidi-Ya Kyobashi Building, a designated tangible cultural property of Chūō City, located within the redevelopment area. A municipal road within the site was also closed and replaced with a pedestrian passageway. The complex consists of two buildings: the newly constructed redevelopment tower and the renovated historic building.

== History ==
- August 2001: The Kyobashi 2-chome West District Town Planning Study Group was established.
- July 2002: The Tokyo Station–Yūrakuchō Station area was designated as an Urban Renaissance Urgent Development Area.
- July 2003: The Kyobashi 2-chome West District Redevelopment Council was established.
- February 2006: The Kyobashi 2-chome West District Redevelopment Preparatory Association was established.
- June 2009: The urban planning decision was announced, including amendments to the Special Urban Renaissance District designation, the Category I Urban Redevelopment Project, and the district plan.
- 2011:
  - Early February: A consortium comprising Nihon Tochi-Tatemono, Tokyo Tatemono, Nikken Sekkei, and Shimizu Corporation was selected as the special business agent.
  - July 12: The governor of Tokyo approved the establishment of the Kyobashi 2-chome West District Urban Redevelopment Association and its project plan.
- 2012:
  - August 8: Approval was obtained from the governor of Tokyo for amendments to the association's articles of association and project plan.
  - December 7: The governor of Tokyo approved the rights conversion plan.
- 2013:
  - April 17: Demolition work began on existing buildings, including the Kyō Building, completed in 1960.
  - October 2: Construction began on the redevelopment tower and the renovated historic building.
- October 22, 2014: Demolition of existing buildings was completed.
- 2015:
  - August 27: Renovation work on the historic building was completed.
  - September 16: The Meidi-Ya Kyobashi Store reopened following renovation.
- 2016:
  - January 19: The complex was officially named KYOBASHI EDOGRAND.
  - Late October: Construction of the redevelopment tower was completed.
  - November 25: The redevelopment tower opened.

== Building specifications ==
- Location: 2-2-1 Kyobashi, Chūō, Tokyo.
- Zoning: Commercial zone, fire prevention district, and high-level use district; building coverage ratio of approximately 72% and floor area ratio of 1,330%.
- District plan: Kyobashi 2-chome West District Category I Urban Redevelopment Project.
- Additional designation: Special Urban Renaissance District.
- Development area: Approximately 1.0 hectare (2.5 acres).
- Site area: Approximately 7,990 square metres (86,000 sq ft).
- Building footprint: Approximately 5,740 square metres (61,800 sq ft).
- Floor area of the redevelopment tower: 113,553.53 square metres (1,222,280.0 sq ft) (excluding the Meidi-Ya Kyobashi Building).
- Floor area of the renovated historic building: Approximately 5,480 square metres (59,000 sq ft).
- Structural system:
  - Redevelopment tower: Steel construction, partially steel-reinforced concrete and reinforced concrete, with a mid-story seismic isolation system.
  - Historic building: Steel-reinforced concrete construction with seismic isolation.
- Height and floors:
  - Redevelopment tower: 32 floors above ground, 3 underground floors, and 2 penthouse floors; height of 170.37 metres (559.0 ft).
  - Historic building: 8 floors above ground and 2 underground floors; height of 31 m.
- Foundation: Spread foundation.
- Building use: Offices, retail facilities, public and community facilities, and parking.
- Project owner: Kyobashi 2-chome West District Urban Redevelopment Association.
- Special business agent: A consortium comprising Nihon Tochi-Tatemono Co., Ltd. (lead company), Tokyo Tatemono Co., Ltd., Nikken Sekkei Ltd., and Shimizu Corporation.
- Architect: Nikken Sekkei Ltd.
- Main contractor: Shimizu Corporation joint venture.
- Construction period: October 2013 – late October 2016.
- Retail outlets: Approximately 30, primarily restaurants.
- Elevators: 17 (8 serving the upper floors, 6 serving the lower floors, and 3 service elevators).
- Parking spaces: 280 (24 conventional and 256 mechanical).

== Cultural property ==
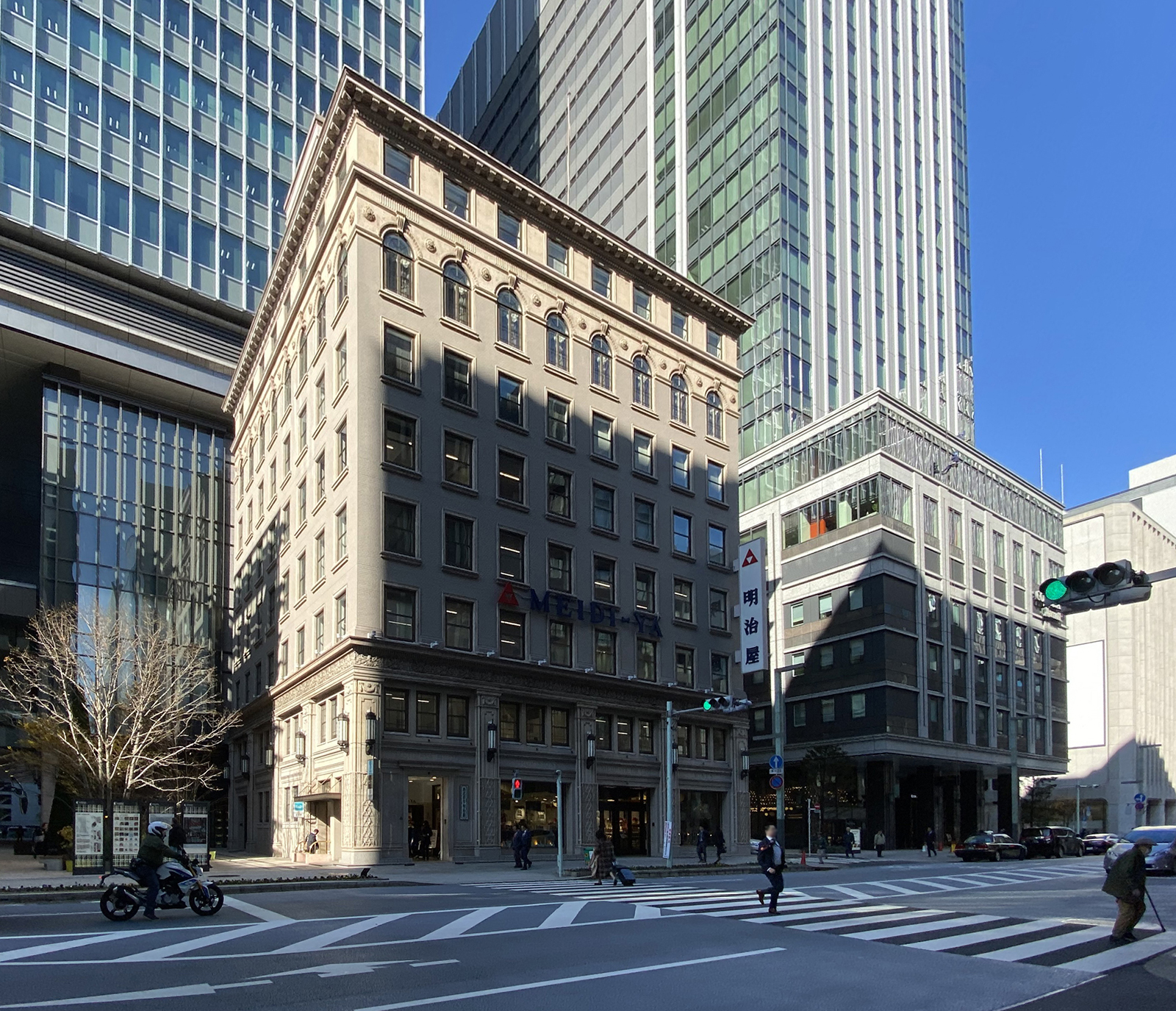
Meidi-Ya Kyobashi Building

Meidi-Ya Kyobashi Building

Constructed in March 1933 as the headquarters building of Meidi-Ya, housing both its offices and retail premises. Designed by the Sone-Chūjō Architectural Office, it is a steel-reinforced concrete office building with eight floors above ground and two underground floors.

An example of modern architecture in the Renaissance style characteristic of the early Shōwa period. It was the first privately owned building in Japan to be constructed with its basement integrated with a Kyobashi subway station, making it one of the oldest buildings of its kind. The building is of historical and cultural significance and is considered an important structure in the history of modern Japanese architecture, having survived the Great Tokyo Air Raid and subsequent changes to its surrounding environment.

== Main facilities ==
- Commercial facilities: Located on the first basement floor and floors 1–6, occupying approximately 2,845.99 square metres (30,634.0 sq ft) and comprising 30 stores, primarily restaurants.
- Offices: Located on floors 7–32, with a standard floor rental area of 2,714.30 square metres (29,216.5 sq ft) and a total floor area of approximately 66,592.58 square metres (716,796.6 sq ft).
- Public and community facilities: Located from the first basement floor through the sixth floor.
- Chūō City temporary accommodation facility for people unable to return home: A facility providing temporary accommodation for visitors and commuters stranded by disasters.
Grand staircase at Kyobashi Central Square (2019)

First basement floor (2019)

Third floor (2019)

View of Kyobashi Central Square (2019)

Kyobashi Edogrand (2017)

== Transportation ==
- JR East Yamanote Line and Keihin-Tōhoku Line – 5 minutes on foot from Tokyo Station.
- Tokyo Metro Ginza Line – 1 minute on foot from Kyobashi Station.
- Tokyo Metro Yūrakuchō Line – 10 minutes on foot from Ginza-itchōme Station.
- Toei Subway Asakusa Line – 6 minutes on foot from Takarachō Station.
