= Morinaga & Company =

Japanese confectionery company

Morinaga & Co., Ltd.

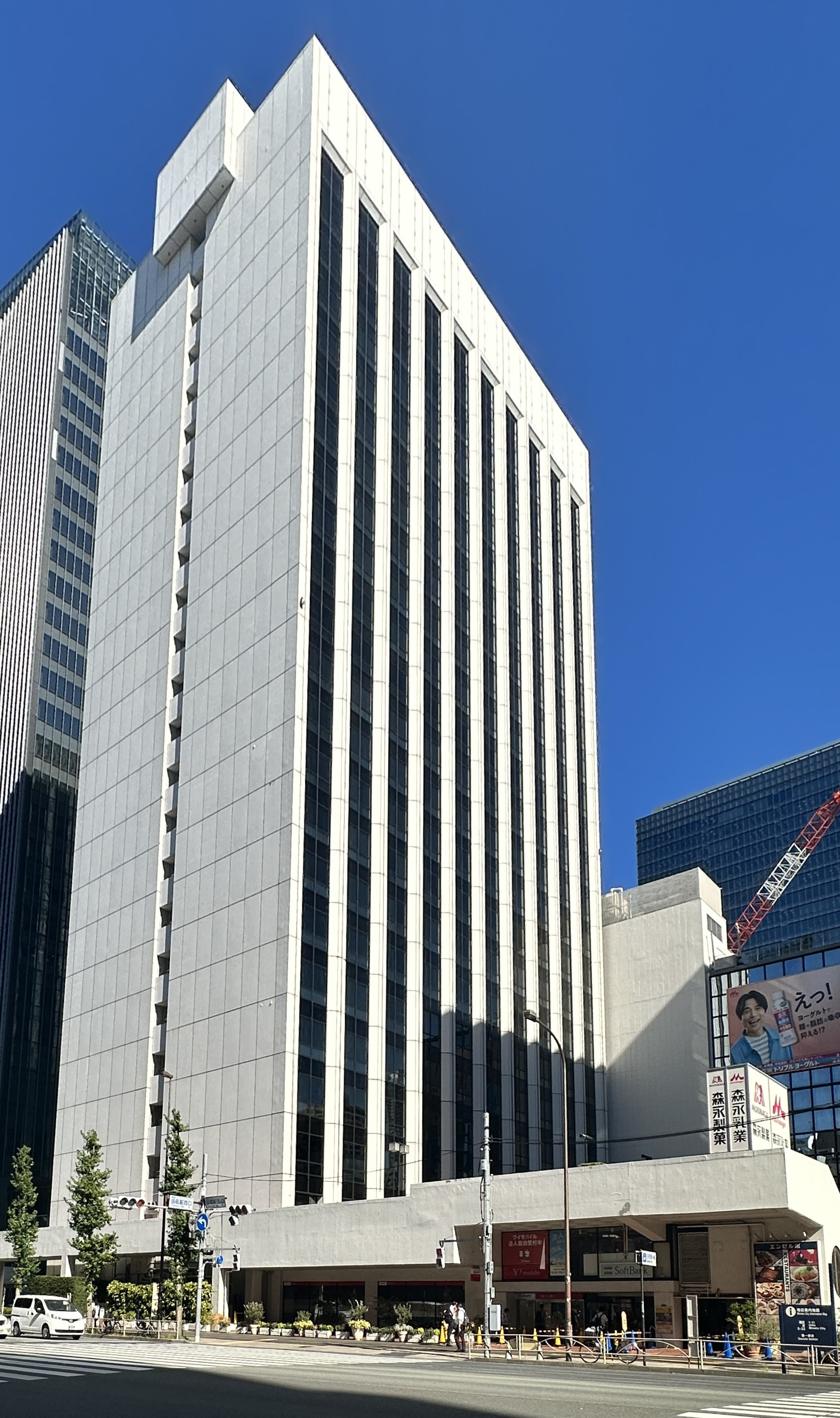
- Native name: 森永製菓株式会社
- Type: Public (K.K)
- Traded as: TYO: 2201
- ISIN: JP3926400007
- Industry: Food
- Founded: August 15, 1899; 126 years ago as Morinaga’s Western Confectionary Shop
- Founder: Taichiro Morinaga
- Headquarters: Shiba, Minato, Tokyo, 108-8403, Japan
- Area served: Worldwide
- Key people: Eijiro Ota (President)
- Products: Confectionery; Beverages; Cocoa; Chilled desserts; Health food
- Revenue: ▲JPY 205 billion (FY 2017) (US$ 1.9 billion) (FY 2017)
- Net income: ▼JPY 10.2 billion (FY 2017) (US$ 97 million) (FY 2017)
- Number of employees: 3,170 (consolidated, as of March 31, 2018)
- Subsidiaries: Morinaga Milk Industry (10.34%)
- Website: Official website

Morinaga & Company, Ltd. (森永製菓株式会社, Morinaga Seika Kabushiki-gaisha) is a Japanese confectionery company headquartered in Tokyo, and founded in 1899. Their products include candy, such as Hi-Chew, and other confectioneries.

Morinaga is loosely affiliated with Morinaga Milk Industry Co., Ltd., a public company in which Morinaga & Company holds 10.34% of the stock.

== Brands ==
Major Morinaga brands include:

- Hi-Chew
- In Jelly / Chargel
- Choco Monaka Jumbo
- Ice Box
- DARS
- Morinaga Biscuits
- Morinaga Milk Cocoa
- Morinaga Amazake
- Morinaga Chocoball
- Packncho (license manufacturer)
- Werther's Original (Japan distributor)
- Pez (Japan distributor)

== History ==
The company was founded in 1899 by Taichiro Morinaga, who opened a Western confectionery shop in Tokyo after returning from the United States. It was incorporated as Morinaga & Co., Ltd. in 1912. In 1918, Morinaga began manufacturing the first chocolate produced in Japan.

In 1944, during World War II, Morinaga created Japan's first domestically produced penicillin.

In 1960, the company advertised that women should give chocolates to men on Valentine's Day. This action strongly influenced the present culture of Valentine's Day in Japan. Moreover, in 2009, the company made chocolates for men to give women, which are called Gyaku-choco. (Gyaku means reverse in Japanese.)

Morinaga began selling its popular Hi-Chew candy in the US market in 2008. The candy quickly became popular among baseball players, a fad started by Japanese baseball player Junichi Tazawa of the Boston Red Sox. Morinaga signed a sponsorship deal with the Red Sox in 2012 and Hi-Chew's popularity spread quickly in the 2010s. Morinaga began reverse imports of American Hi-Chew flavors to Japan in 2023.

Morinaga has had Ayumi Hamasaki and Mao Asada appear in their commercials, and in the past has used stars such as the Carpenters to advertise their products.

== Locations ==
Morinaga is headquartered in the Shiba district of Minato, Tokyo, adjacent to Tamachi Station, and has production facilities in Tsurumi-ku, Yokohama, Oyama, Tochigi, Mishima, Shizuoka, and Anjo, Aichi.

Morinaga began manufacturing Hi-Chew candy in Mebane, North Carolina in 2016. Morinaga announced plans for a second Mebane factory in 2024, scheduled to begin manufacturing in 2027.

== See also ==
- Glico Morinaga case
- Marie biscuit
