= Journal of Macromarketing =

- Language: English
- Edited by: Mark Peterson

Publication details
- History: 1981–present
- Publisher: SAGE Publications
- Frequency: Quarterly
- Impact factor: 1.969 (2017)

Standard abbreviations
- ISO 4: J. Macromarketing

Indexing
- ISSN: 0276-1467 (print); 1552-6534 (web)
- LCCN: 81643778
- OCLC no.: 485801862

Links
- Journal homepage; Online access; Online archive

The Journal of Macromarketing is a peer-reviewed academic journal that publishes papers in the field of business. The journal's editor is Mark Peterson (University of Wyoming). It has been in publication since 1981 and is currently published by SAGE Publications.

== Scope ==
The Journal of Macromarketing aims to examine social issues and how they are affected by factors such as marketing, society influences and the conduct of marketing. The journal is multidisciplinary and covers areas such as management, economics and sociology.

== Abstracting and indexing ==
The Journal of Macromarketing is abstracted and indexed in, among other databases: SCOPUS, and the Social Sciences Citation Index. According to the Journal Citation Reports, its 2017 impact factor is 1.969, ranking it 81 out of 140 journals in the category ‘Business’.
