= Taichiro Morinaga =

Japanese entrepreneur

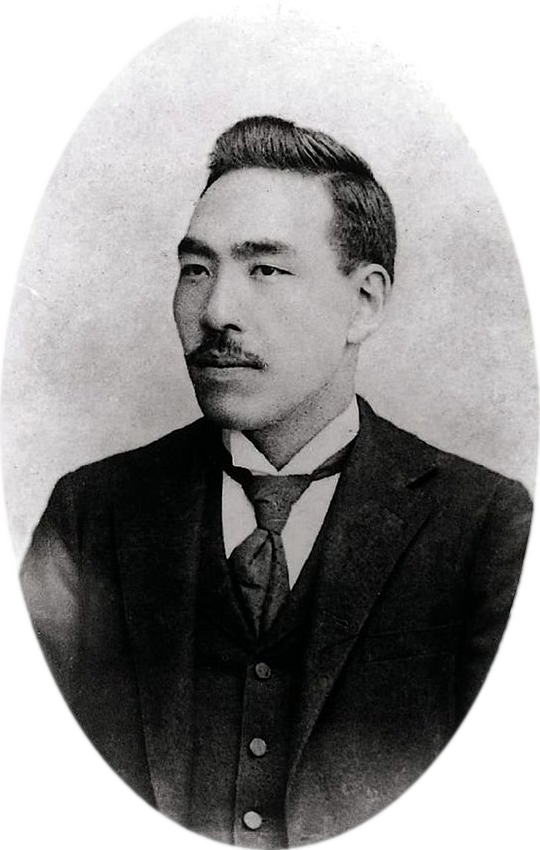
- Born: Taichiro Morinaga; 1865
- Died: 1937 (aged 71–72); Japan
- Known for: Founding Morinaga & Company, philanthropy

Taichiro Morinaga (森永 太一郎, 1865–1937) was a Japanese entrepreneur and philanthropist. In 1899, he founded what would become Morinaga & Co, the first modern candy company in Japan, and the first to mass-produce chocolates in the country. Now known for the popular fruit candy Hi-Chew, one of Morinaga & Co's first products was marshmallow.

== Early life ==
Morinaga was born in 1865, in Hizen Imari on Japan's southern island of Kyushu. He had no formal education. His father died when he was young and he was estranged from his mother's family. Later he became a potter's apprentice in Yokohama. He later became a branch manager for a wholesaler in nearby Yokohama, but his branch lost money after extending too much credit to customers due to leniency. Since employees were considered personally responsible for such losses, Morinaga searched for a way to repay his boss. With no local prospects found to repay the loss, Morinaga, at age 23, moved to the United States where he opened a hardware store in San Francisco. Racism against Asians, common at the time, made business difficult. During the visit, he also converted to Christianity.

== Candy pioneer in Japan ==
During his time in the United States, an American gave him a piece of candy which was a new appetizing treat for Morinaga. Morinaga returned to Japan but came to the United States for a second time. He was unable to obtain candy apprentice jobs in the United States because of his race. Instead, he worked as a janitor in a candy factory to gain experience.

Morinaga studied candymaking in the United States for eleven years before returning to Japan. In 1899, he opened a candy store in the Akasaka District of Tokyo called "Morinaga Mill of Western-style Sweets" (later called Morinaga & Co). Japanese people in the United States had told Morinaga that they liked marshmallows, but that they were unavailable in Japan. Inspirited by this knowledge, his first product was marshmallows, which he called "angel food" because of their color and the association with Christianity. He started by selling perishable sweets from a pushcart, but shifted to selling non-perishable sweets as a wholesaler. His products were initially popular with the wives of foreign ministers. Morinaga hired Hanzaburo Matsuzaki, a friend and Christian, to market his candies in 1905, and the company started mass production of sweets with a factory steam engine in 1909. While Morinaga was initially doubtful that Japanese people would ever like milk and butter flavors, his 10-cen milk caramels became very popular in 1914. They were less buttery and more resistant to melting in hot Japanese weather than the caramel formulations that he had seen in the United States. To adapt chocolate for the Japanese market, where chocolate had a reputation for bitterness, Morinaga sold milk chocolate, with advertisements describing its flavor as "On behalf of modern Japanese tastes." In 1918, his company was the first to mass-produce chocolate in Japan. In addition to caramels and chocolate, Morinaga Mill also produced biscuits, drops, and milk-related products. Morinaga said that he produced several different products rather than one because the market for Western-style sweets was still small.

Morinaga is considered one of Japan's greatest industrialists who was not part of a zaibatsu. Early difficulties of the company included the fact that Japan had little commercial milk production, obliging the company to open its own dairy. Another difficulty was that Japan had little arable land for crops and no locally produced corn or sugar cane to make corn syrup.

== Relationship marketing ==
After Matsuzaki refused to let retailers sell competing products in the 1920s, Morinaga replaced contract-based wholesale agents with a sales company that Morinaga co-invested. The salespeople in these new companies worked with retailers to help sell products. This system was part of the keiretsu, or informal business group, that Morinaga was a part of. Morinaga opened its own western-style retail stores, complete with a display window and soda fountain. His network of exclusive retailers rose to 4,000 stores before World War II. The retailers had to avoid selling products similar to Morinaga's and sell Morinaga's products for certain fixed prices. Morinaga also created a society for sweets retailers to encourage the modernization of the industry, and gave illustrated examples of how to create a display window and modern floorplan. Morinaga's various vertical marketing campaigns included a special product available only on the 1st and the 15th of every month, a nationwide art festival using candy wrappers, and "special days" for member stores in certain regions. Inspired by Takashimaya's "mannequin girl", Morinaga hired five "Sweet Girls" to be demonstrators/models at events. The MB Club sent members candy twice a month and invited them to special events, in exchange for a monthly fee. The MB Club was one of the first club marketing programs in Japan. These practices showed Hanzaburo's marketing philosophy of "selling deeply" to return customers and retailers. After World War Two, Morinaga started the organization of retail stores with exclusive selling rights under the name "Morinaga Angel Stores" in 1949. The keiretsu retail store eventually gave way to the Japanese self-service store, or super in 1972.

== Legacy ==
After the Great Kantō earthquake, Morinaga led rescue efforts and also distributed sweets and dairy products to people displaced by the disaster and made donations for the purchase of rice to distribute to disaster victims.

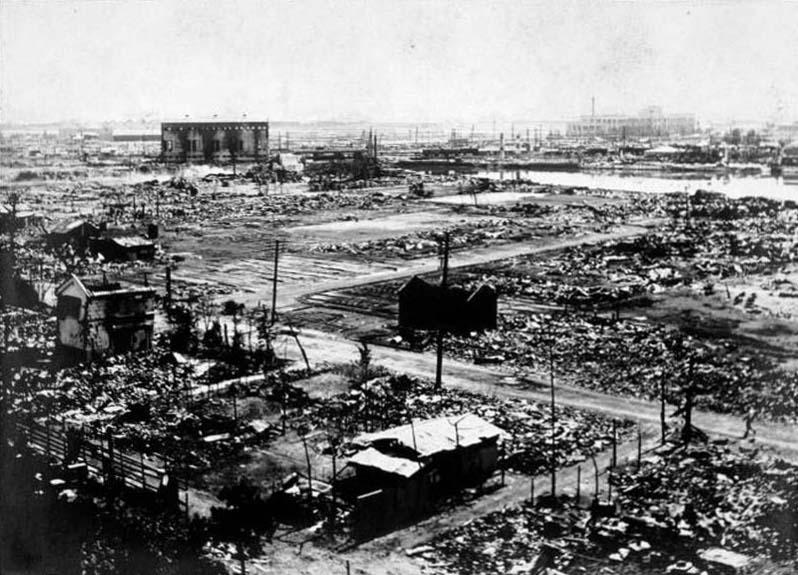
View of the destruction in Yokohama after the Great Kanto earthquake

In 1944, Morinaga's company, with the Army Medical School of Japan, was the first to produce penicillin, an antibiotic drug, in Japan.
