= Meiji Seika Pharma =

Japanese food and pharmaceutical company

Meiji Seika Pharma Co., Ltd.
- Trade name: Meiji
- Native name: Meiji Seika ファルマ株式会社
- Formerly: List: Tokyo Confectionery Co., Ltd. (1916-1924); Meiji Seika Kaisha Co., Ltd. (1924-1943); Meiji Sangyo Kaisha Co., Ltd. (1943-2011)
- Company type: Subsidiary
- Industry: Pharmaceutical
- Founded: Tokyo, Japan (October 9, 1916; 109 years ago, Tokyo Kashi Company)
- Headquarters: 4-16, Kyobashi Nitchome, Chuo, Tokyo, Japan
- Key people: Hanji Sōma (Founder)
- Parent: Meiji Holdings
- Website: www.meiji-seika-pharma.co.jp/english/

Meiji Seika Pharma Co., Ltd. (Meiji Seikaファルマ株式会社, Meiji Seika Faruma Kabushiki gaisha), formerly Meiji Seika Kaisha, Ltd. (明治製菓株式会社, Meiji Seika Kabushiki-gaisha) is a Japanese pharmaceutical company. It is currently a subsidiary of Meiji Holdings and a Japanese leader in the area of infectious disease with 18% market share. It markets treatments for depression, obsessive-compulsive disorder, vaccines, and allergy drugs. Meiji Pharma is doing research in generic anticancer drugs and biosimilars with partner organisations.

They acquired the Stauffer Biscuit Company based in York, Pennsylvania, US, in 2004.

On April 1, 2009, Meiji Seika Kaisha, Ltd. and Meiji Dairies Corporation established a joint holding company, Meiji Holdings, which is a constituent of the Nikkei 225 index. Two years later on the day, the food and healthcare business was taken over by Meiji Dairies to form "Meiji Co., Ltd.", and Meiji Seika was reorganized to a pharmaceutical company "Meiji Seika Pharma Co., Ltd." In 2014, Meiji acquired Medreich for $290 million, an Indian company active in selling generic pharmaceuticals to Europe, Asia, and Africa.

== Logos ==
Old Meiji Seika brand logo (used from 1955 until March 2009)

Current logo
