= List of Japanese anniversaries and memorial days =

This is a list of Japanese anniversaries and memorial days or kinenbi (記念日). Many dates have been selected because of a special relationship with the anniversary, but some are the product of Japanese wordplay (語呂合わせ, goroawase).

These are listed by month in date order. Those excluded from the list are as follows:

- Public holidays in Japan such as New Year's Day, National Foundation Day, etc.
- Traditional festivals such as Tanabata and Setsubun
- Personal anniversaries (such as birthdays and wedding anniversaries)
- Anniversaries and memorial days that are only held in a certain locality
- Anniversaries created by companies or organizations to promote a product or event that were not continued or effectively were not commemorated.

== Japanese anniversaries and memorial days ==
=== February ===
- 14 February: Valentine's Day

=== March ===
- 14 March: White Day
- 20 March: Minion Day

=== April ===
- 18 April: Invention Day — Japan Patent Office
- 20 April: Postal Day — Japan Post Holdings
- 23 April: Children's reading Day (子ども読書の日, Kodomo Dokusho no Hi)

=== May ===
- 9 May: Goku (孫悟空) Day — established by the Japan Anniversary Association in 2015
- 27 May: Dragon Quest Day — established by the Japan Anniversary Association in 2018 for its impact on Japanese culture

=== June ===
- 5 June: Environment Day (環境の日, Kankyo no Hi)
- 10 June: Anniversary of Time (時の記念日, Toki no Kinenbi)
- 23 June: Okinawa Memorial Day (慰霊の日, Irei no Hi; lit. "the day to console the dead") — Okinawa Prefecture

=== July ===
- 7 July: Tanabata (星祭り, Hoshi Matsuri, "Star Festival")
- 22 July: One Piece Day — established by the Japan Anniversary Association in 2017

=== August ===
- 14 August: Happy Summer Valentine (テニスの王子様) — established by the Japan Anniversary Association in 2018

=== September ===
- 6 September: Younger Sister's Day (妹の日, Imouto no Hi)
- 9 September: [Attack On Titan Day]] (妹の日, Shingeki no kyojin)
- 13 September: Fist of the North Star (北斗の拳) Day — established by the Japan Anniversary Association in 2018

=== October ===
- 1 October: International Music Day (国際音楽の日, Kokusai Ongaku no Hi)

=== November ===
- 1 November: Classics Day (古典の日, Koten no Hi) — established on November 1, 2008, which was the 1000th anniversary of The Tale of Genji
- 11 November: Pocky & Pretz Day (ポッキー＆プリッツの日, Pokkii & Purittsu no hi) — marketing event regarding Glico products Pocky and Pretz

=== December ===
- 1 December: Motion Picture Day — Motion Picture Producers Association of Japan
