= List of The 100 Girlfriends Who Really, Really, Really, Really, Really Love You chapters =

The 100 Girlfriends Who Really, Really, Really, Really, Really Love You is written by Rikito Nakamura and illustrated by Yukiko Nozawa. It has been serialized in Shueisha's seinen manga magazine Weekly Young Jump since December 26, 2019. Its chapters are collected and published by Shueisha into individual tankōbon volumes. The first volume was released on April 17, 2020. As of September 17, 2026, twenty-seven volumes have been released.

On July 2, 2021, Seven Seas Entertainment announced they licensed the series for English publication in North America in print and on digital platforms in single volume editions. The first volume was released on February 22, 2022.

== Volumes ==
No.	Original release date	Original ISBN	English release date	English ISBN
1	April 17, 2020	978-4-08-891533-3	February 22, 2022	978-1-63858-136-9
1. "Hanazono-san and Inda-san" (花園さんと院田さん, Hanazono-san to Inda-san); 2. "The First-Ever Kiss" (はじめてのチュウ, Hajimete no Chū); 3. "Yoshimoto-san" (好本さん); 4. "Looks Like a Hanky-Panky Episode..." (いちゃいちゃ回と思いきや, Ichaicha-kai to Omoiki ya); 5. "And It IS a Hanky-Panky Episode" (その実、もっといちゃいちゃ回, Sono Jitsu, Motto Ichaicha-kai); 1. "Rentarō's First Love" (恋太郎の初恋, Rentarō no Hatsukoi)
2	June 19, 2020	978-4-08-891569-2	April 12, 2022	978-1-63858-206-9
6. "Eiai-san" (栄逢さん); 7. "The AI Girl's Meaningless Day" (AI少女の無意義な日, AI Shōjo no Muigi na Hi); 8. "The Fan Favorite: Swimsuit Episode!" (皆大好き水着回, Minna Daisuki Mizugi-kai); 9. "Lovers at the Water Park" (スパリゾートの恋人達, Supa Rizōto no Koibito-tachi); 10. "The Mysterious Senpai in the Chemistry Lab" (化学室にいた謎の先輩, Kagaku-shitsu ni Ita Nazo no Senpai); 11. "Hello to the Medicine Girl" (はじめましてのお薬少女, Hajimemashite no Okusuri Shōjo); 12. "Kiss Zombie ♥ Panic" (キスゾンビ♥パニック, Kisu Zonbi ♥ Panikku); 13. "Because I Love You the Way You Are" (そんな先輩が好きだから, Son'na Senpai ga Suki dakara); 14. "The Sacred Battle for Heart and Spirit" (愛と魂をかけた聖戦, Ai to Tamashī o Kaketa Seisen); 1. "Boob Guessing Game" (おむね当てゲーム, Omune Ate Gēmu)
3	September 18, 2020	978-4-08-891656-9	July 12, 2022	978-1-63858-375-2
15. "Behind the Goodbye" (さよならの理由, Sayonara no Riyū); 16. "Love Mission: Impossible" (ラブミッション：インポッシブル, Rabu Misshon: Inposshiburu); 17. "Hakari's Mother" (羽香里のお母様, Hakari no Okāsama); 18. "Lie Detector Witch Trial" (嘘吐き探しの魔女裁判, Usotsuki Sagashi no Majo Saiban); 19. "If It Costs Me My Life" (この命にかえても, Kono Inochi ni Kaete mo); 20. "We Promised: We're Going In on the Fan Service" (やると言ったからには全力でご褒美回をやる, Yaru to Itta Kara ni wa Zenryoku de Gohōbi-kai o Yaru); 21. "We're Still Going in the New Chapter, Because We Are ALL IN" (話数を跨ごうがやる。これが全力でやると言う事だ, Wasū o Matagō ga Yaru. Kore ga Zenryoku de Yaru to Iu Koto da); 22. "The Hanazono Family" (花園家の人達, Hanazono-ke no Hito-tachi); 23. "Her Name." (彼の名は。, Kano no Na wa.); 1. "Hahari-san Needs Someone to Pamper" (羽々里さんは甘えられたい, Hahari-san wa Amaeraretai)
4	December 18, 2020	978-4-08-891736-8	November 22, 2022	978-1-63858-805-4
24. "The Voracious High School Student" (はらぺこの後輩, Harapeko no Kōhai); 25. "The Food Fight Festival...Begins!" (開幕！フードファイトフェスティバル, Kaimaku! Fūdo Faito Fesutibaru); 26. "The Food Fight Festival...Heats Up!" (激闘！フードファイトフェスティバル, Gekitō! Fūdo Faito Fesutibaru); 27. "The Food Fight Festival...Concludes!" (決着！フード ファイト フェスティバル！, Ketchaku! Fūdo Faito Fesutibaru); 28. "We Were All Babies Once" (みんな昔はベイビーだった, Minna Mukashi wa Beibī datta); 29. "Pen-taro's Epic Adventure" (ペン太郎の大冒険, Pentarō no Dai Bōken); 30. "The Ever-Smiling Maid" (いつも笑顔のメイドさん, Itsumo Egao no Meido-san); 31. "Master of the Day" (１日ご主人様体験❤︎, Ichi-nichi Goshujin-sama Taiken); 32. "Super-Soaked Maid Party" (ぬれぬれメイドパーティー, Nure Nure Meido Pātī); 1. "When Mei Met Hahari" (芽衣と羽々里の出会い, Mei to Hahari no Deai)
5	March 18, 2021	978-4-08-891816-7	February 21, 2023	978-1-63858-972-3
33. "Sutou-san" (須藤さん); 34. "Coach Rentarō's Training Program of Passion" (恋太郎監督の熱血愛指導, Rentarō Kantoku no Nekketsu Ai Shidō); 35. "It's Not Like We're Playing Baseball Just 'Cause There're Nine of Us!" (きゅ、9人だから野球だとか安直なアレじゃないんだからねっ！！, Kyu, Kyū-nin dakara Yakyū da Toka Anchoku na Are ja nain dakara ne!!); 36. "An Oath to Your Home Run" (君のホームランに誓う, Kimi no Hōmu Ran ni Chikau); 37. "Lovey-Dovey-Wub-Wub" (好き好き大好き❤︎, Suki Suki Daisuki); 38. "Karaoke Krisis" (カラオケ・クライシス, Karaoke Kuraishisu); 39. "Utsukushisugi-senpai" (美杉先輩); 40. "An Unforgettable Past" (忘れ得ぬ過去, Wasure Enu Kako); 41. "Mimimi-senpai's Beauty Advice (Probably)" (美々美先輩の美しさ指南(多分), Mimimi-senpai no Utsukushi-sa Shinan (Tabun)); 1. "And Thus, a Monster Was Created" (こうしてモンスターは生まれた, Kōshite Monsutā wa Umareta)
6	June 18, 2021	978-4-08-892007-8	May 9, 2023	978-1-68579-540-5
42. "A Very Normal, Highly Ordinary, Hairstyling Episode" (どこにでもあるただのヘアチェンジ回, Doko ni Demo Aru Tada no Hea Chenji-kai); 43. "After You End the World" (あなたがセカイを終わらせて、そして, Anata ga Sekai o Owarasete, Soshite); 44. "I Want to Eat Your Tongue" (君の牛タンをたべたい, Kimi no Gyūtan o Tabetai); 45. "Kakure-san" (華暮さん); 46. "The Cute-tastic! Hide-and-seek@School" (鬼キュン！校内かくれんぼ, Oni Kyun! Kōnai Kakurenbo); 47. "Mei-san's Big Surprise Present" (芽衣さんのプレゼント大作戦, Mei-san no Purezento Dai Sakusen); 48. "Tsundere Lost" (失われしツンデレ, Ushinawareshi Tsundere); 49. "Tsundere Sought" (取り戻せツンデレ, Torimodose Tsundere); 50. "Tsundere Beloved" (愛すべきツンデレ, Aisubeki Tsundere); 1. "Her First Misdirection" (はじめてのみすでぃれくしょん, Hajimete no Misudirekushon)
7	September 17, 2021	978-4-08-892072-6	September 5, 2023	978-1-68579-922-9
51. "Chiyo-chan" (知与ちゃん); 52. "Chiyo-chan's Family Guidance" (知与ちゃんのファミリー指導, Chiyo-chan no Famirī Shidō); 53. "This Is Basically a Commercial" (ニチアサは大体これ, Nichiasa wa Daitai Kore); 54. "The Cancellation of the Rentarō Family On-Campus Kissing Activities" (恋太郎ファミリーの校内キス禁止令, Rentarō Famirī no Kōnai Kisu Kinshi-rei); 55. "Everyone Loves a Training Chapter" (皆大好き修行回, Minna Daisuki Shugyō-kai); 56. "The Lap Pillow Champion Play-off" (膝枕王者決定戦, Hizamakura Ōja Kettei-sen); 57. "Miss Naddy" (ナディー先生, Nadī-sensei); 58. "Miss Naddy's Freedom Time" (ナディー先生の自由の時間, Nadī-sensei no Jiyū no Jikan); 59. "Prison Club Break" (プリ(ズン)・ブレイク, Puri (Zun) Bureiku); 1. "Nadeshiko Girl and Awakening of the Catastrophic English" (撫子少女と壊滅的イングリッシュの目覚め, Nadeshiko Shōjo to Kaimetsuteki Ingurisshu no Mezame)
8	December 17, 2021	978-4-08-892164-8	December 5, 2023	979-8-88843-068-2
60. "Boyish Girlfriend" (ボーイッシュな彼女, Bōisshu na Kanojo); 61. "My First Errand" (はじめてのおつ回, Hajimete no Otsu-kai); 62. "The Rentarō Family's Idolmaking Project" (恋太郎ファミリーアイドル化計画, Rentarō Famirī Aidoru-ka Keikaku); 63. "And Now, to a Brand New Stage" (そして新たなステージへ, Soshite Arata na Sutēji e); 64. "Yasashiki-san" (優敷さん); 65. "Yamame-chan's Gardening Club Tour" (山女ちゃんの園芸部ツアー, Yamame-chan no Engei-bu Tsuā); 66. "Now... Let the Shadow Game Begin!" (さぁ…闇のゲームの始まりだぜ！, Sā... Yami no Gēmu no Hajimari daze!); 67. "Sea Otter Hot Pot Sumo Tournament (Grave Sea Otter Slander)" (ラッコ鍋相撲大会(深刻なラッコへの風評被害), Rakko Nabe Sumō Taikai (Shinkokuna Rakko e no Fūhyō Higai)); 68. "Farewell, Sea Otter Hot Pot Sumo Tournament" (さらばラッコ鍋相撲大会, Saraba Rakko Nabe Sumō Taikai); 1. "The Rentarō Family's Summer Vacation" (恋太郎ファミリーの夏休み, Rentarō Famirī no Natsuyasumi); 1. "Her First Killing" (はじめてのせっしょう, Hajimete no Sesshō)
9	March 18, 2022	978-4-08-892245-4	March 12, 2024	979-8-88843-418-5
69. "Momi-san" (茂見さん); 70. "Momiji-chan's Fondling Festival" (紅葉ちゃんのもみもみフェスティバル, Momiji-chan no Momi Momi Fesutibaru); 71. "Miss Naddy's 'Murrican Patrol" (ナディー先生はアメーリカパトロール, Nadī-sensei wa Amērika Patorōru); 72. "The Nanoputian's Prince" (一寸凪乃師の王子様, Issun Nanoshi no Ōji-sama); 73. "May I Trouble You For a Love Story?" (恋話、聞いてイイですか？, Koibana, Kiite Ī desu ka?); 74. "Nozawa-Sensei Already Calls Hakari's Dad "Papari", So Should She Really Be Calling Kusuri's Dad "Papari" Too?" (野澤先生 羽香里のお父さんの事「パパ里」って呼んでるけど楠莉のお父さんの事も「パパ莉」って呼ぶのかな 呼ばないか, Nozawa-sensei Hakari no Otousan no Koto "Papari" tte Yonderu kedo Kusuri no Otousan no Koto mo "Papari" tte Yobu noka na Yobanai ka); 75. "Kusuri-senpai's Grandmother" (楠莉先輩のおばあさん, Kusuri-senpai no Obāsan); 76. "Yaku-san's Girlfriend Concentration" (ヤクさんの彼女神経衰弱, Yaku-san no Kanojo Shinkei-Suijaku); 77. "Rentarō Family's Onsen Date" (恋太郎ファミリーの温泉デート, Rentarō's Famirī no Onsen Dēto); 1. "Rentarō Family in the Fairyland" (おとぎの国の恋太郎ファミリー, Otogi no Kuni no Rentarō Famirī); 1. "Her First Fluffy" (はじめてのふわふわ, Hajimete no Fuwafuwa)
10	June 17, 2022	978-4-08-892338-3	June 11, 2024	979-8-88843-645-5
78. "Mwehehe, Aye" (むふふだど, Mufufu dado); 79. "Everyone Was a Coed at Some Point" (みんな昔はJKだった, Minna Mukashi wa Jēkē datta); 80. "Rentarō Family's Hiking Date" (恋太郎ファミリーのハイキングデート, Rentarō Famirī no Haikingu Dēto); 81. "The Kendo Club's Lady Knight" (剣道部の女騎士さん, Kendō-bu no Onna Kishi san); 82. "The Lady Knight's Enrollment Test That Kinda Looks Like the Final Fight in Demon Slayer" (女騎士の入団試験もしくは鬼滅のラスボス戦のようななにか, Onna Kishi no Nyūdan Shiken Moshikuwa Kimetsu no Rasubosu-sen no Yōna Nanika); 83. "Rentarō Family vs. Challenge Ramen" (恋太郎ファミリーVSチャレンジラーメン, Rentarō Famirī Bāsasu Charenji Rāmen); 84. "Everyone Was a Baby at Some Point Returns" (みんな昔はベイビーだったリターンズ, Minna Mukashi wa Beibī datta Ritānzu); 85. "A Day with Rentarō" (恋太郎の1日, Rentarō no Ichi Nichi); 86. "Pocky Game Royale" (ポッキーゲームロワイヤル, Pokkī Gēmu Rowaiyaru); 1. "Her First Melting" (はじめてのとろとろ, Hajimete no Torotoro)
11	September 16, 2022	978-4-08-892427-4	September 10, 2024	979-8-88843-867-1
87. "Kedarui-san" (毛樽井さん); 88. "Welcome to Rentarō Family's Shopping District" (ようこそ恋太郎ファミリー商店街, Yōkoso Rentarō Famirī Shōtengai); 89. "A Training Chapter ft. the Two Who Need it the Least" (修行回 feat. 特にする必要のない2人, Shugyō-kai Fīcharingu Tokuni Suru Hitsuyō no Nai Futari); 90. "Saved by You, by Your Book" (本にあなたに救われて, Hon ni Anata ni Sukuwarete); 91. "An Equipment Chapter" (装備回, Sōbi-kai); 92. "My BFFs" (あーしのズッ友, Āshi no Zuttomo); 93. "A Chapter That's Just Close-ups of Everyone Wearing Glasses" (皆が眼鏡かけたお顔ドアップで見るだけの回, Minna ga Megane Kaketa Okao Doappu de Miru dake no Kai); 94. "The Girl Fishing in a Puddle" (水たまりで釣りをする少女, Mizutamari de Tsuri o Suru Shōjo); 95. "A Bard Knows All There is to Know" (吟遊詩人はなんでも知っている, Gin'yū-Shijin wa Nandemo Shitte iru); 1. "Her First Kawaii / Her First Bard" (はじめてのかーいー／はじめてのぎんゆうしじん, Hajimete no Kāī / Hajimete no Gin'yū-Shijin)
12	December 19, 2022	978-4-08-892537-0	December 24, 2024	979-8-89160-208-3
96. "Rentarō Family's Toxic Jar" (恋太郎ファミリーの蠱毒, Rentarō Famirī no Kodoku); 97. "Rentarō Family vs. The Quad Town Public Sports Festival" (恋太郎ファミリーVS四町対抗市民運動会, Rentarō Famirī Bāsasu Yon-chō Taikō Shimin Undō-kai); 98. "Rentarō Family vs. Kiraisugi's Athlete Corps" (恋太郎ファミリーVS木雷杉町アスリート軍団, Rentarō Famirī Bāsasu Kiraisugi-chō Asurīto Gundan); 99. "His Thoughts, Our Thoughts, All Connected" (彼の 皆の 想いを繋いで, Kare no Minna no Omoi o Tsunaide); 100. "Working on This Series Has Made Me Happier Than I Can Say. Honestly, Thank You All So Much. We're in This for the Long Haul!" ((第100話)も連載できて幸せな限りです本当にありが とうございますこれからも頑張ります, (Dai Hyaku-wa) mo Rensai Dekite Shiawase na Kagiri desu Hontō ni Arigatō Gozaimasu Korekara mo Ganbari masu); 101. "Mai Dear Sister Mei's Little Sister" (妹は芽衣お姉様の妹, Mai wa Mei Onēsama no Imōto); 102. "Mai Little Little Sister Maid Lessons" (妹の妹妹メイドレッスン, Mai no Imōto Imōto Meido Ressun); 103. "Hakari's Heat" (羽香里の発情期, Hakari no Hatsujō-ki); 104. "The Gorgeous 100 GFs"/"The Pure Side" (きれいな100カノ, Kireina Hyakkano); 1. "Her First Older Sister" (はじめてのおねえさま, Hajimete no Onēsama)
13	March 17, 2023	978-4-08-892629-2	March 4, 2025	979-8-89160-903-7
105. "Yaku vs. Kishika vs. Rentarō" (ヤクVS騎士華VS恋太郎, Yaku Bāsasu Kishika Bāsasu Rentarō); 106. "Rentarō Family's Yakiniku Date" (恋太郎ファミリーの焼肉デート, Rentarō Famirī no Yakiniku Dēto); 107. "That's What Addictive Cabbage Tastes Like" (やみつきキャベツはアレの味, Yamitsuki Kyabetsu wa Are no Aji); 108. "Bonnouji-sensei is a Loser" (盆能寺先生はダメ人間, Bonnōji-sensei wa Dame Ningen); 109. "Rentarō Family's Serious Pretend Drinking Party" (恋太郎ファミリーの本気飲み会ごっこ, Rentarō Famirī no Honki Nomikai Gokko); 110. "No Alcohol or Anything With Similar Effects Has Been Consumed" (アルコール及びアルコールと同様の効果があるものは摂取しておりません, Arukōru Oyobi Arukōru to Dōyō no Kōka ga Aru Mono wa Sessyu Shite orimasen); 111. "One Could Call it a Duet Betwixt a Gal and a Bard, Perhaps" (あえて言うならギャルと吟遊詩人の二重奏――かな, Aete Iu nara Gyaru to Gin'yū-Shijin no Nijūsō --kana); 112. "Mimimi-senpai is a Beautiful Heroine" (美々美先輩は美しいヒロイン, Mimimi-senpai wa Utsukushī Hiroin); 113. "Spring Light Show Dates are Most Efficient" (春イルミデートは最効率に, Haru Irumi Dēto wa Saikōritsu ni); 1. "Her First Gambling and Drinking" (はじめてのぎゃんぶる＆いんしゅ, Hajimete no Gyanburu Ando Inshu)
14	July 19, 2023	978-4-08-892718-3	June 17, 2025	979-8-89160-989-1
114. "A Tsunderesque Date" (ツンデレ色のデート, Tsundere-iro no Dēto); 115. "Baio Rin-san is a Violin Aficionado" (灰尾凛さんはバイオリン少女, Baio Rin-san wa Baiorin Shōjo); 116. "Rentarō Family's Zombie Nurse Tag" (恋太郎ファミリーのゾンビナース鬼ごっこ, Rentarō Famirī no Zonbi-Nāsu Onigokko); 117. "The End of Violence" (バイオレンスの果てに, Baiorensu no Hate ni); 118. "Farewell to Naddian, Long Live Naddian" (さらばナディー語よエターナルに, Saraba Nadī-go yo Etānaru ni); 119. "Fondling Festival (Part Two)" (もみフェス（第二部）, Momi Fesu (Dai Nibu)); 120. "Rentarō Family's Daily Life" (恋太郎ファミリーの日常, Rentarō Famirī no Nichijō); 121. "Do You Like Going On Dates With High Class Ladies?" (お嬢様デートはお好きですか?, Ojōsama Dēto wa Osuki desuka?); 122. "A Home Date With Meme-chan and Her Stuffed Toys" (愛々ちゃんとあみぐるみお部屋デート, Meme-chan to Amigurumi Oheya Dēto); 1. "Her First Happy Smile" (はじめてのいひひ, Hajimete no Ihihi)
15	October 19, 2023	978-4-08-892861-6	September 2, 2025	979-8-89373-745-5
123. "A Maiden in Love" (恋をする少女, Koi o Suru Shōjo); 124. "1 and 1 in Year 1 Class 1" (1年1組の1と1, Ichi-nen Ichi-kumi no Ichi to Ichi); 125. "Kusuri and Kishika Are Classmates" (楠莉と騎士華はクラスメイト, Kusuri to Kishika wa Kurasu Meito); 126. "An Adult Date with Chiyo-chan" (知与ちゃんとオトナのデート, Chiyo-chan to Otona no Dēto); 127. "Night-pool" (夜プ, Yoru Pu); 128. "A Very Small and Very Cute Chapter" (なんか小さくてかわいい回, Nanka Chīsakute Kawaii Kai); 129. "The Doomed Trio" (終わってる3人, Owatteru San-nin); 130. "Rentarō Family's Daily Life (Part 2)" (恋太郎ファミリーの日常 (その2), Rentarō Famirī no Nichijō (Sono Ni)); 131. "Problem After Problem at the Mountain Teahouse" (山茶屋はピンチがいっぱい, Yama-Jaya wa Pinchi ga Ippai); 1. "Her First Farewell" (はじめてのさよなら, Hajimete no Sayonara)
16	November 17, 2023	978-4-08-892896-8	December 2, 2025	979-8-89373-746-2
132. "Kaho-san the Capoeirista" (カポエイラ使いの火保さん, Kapoeira Tsukai no Kaho-san); 133. "Playing With the Capoeira Lady" (カポエイラお姉さんと遊ぼう, Kapoeira Onēsan to Asobō); 134. "Tell Me in Confidence" (あなたの内緒を聞かせて, Anata no Naisho o Kikasete); 135. "Mother, Um" (お母さん、あのね, Okāsan, Anone); 136. "Rentarō Family and the School Ghost Story" (恋太郎ファミリーと学校の怪談, Rentarō Famirī to Gakkō no Kwaidan); 137. "Rentarō Family vs. Youkai (It's Basically Total Youkai War)" (恋太郎ファミリーVS妖怪（要するに妖怪大戦争）, Rentarō Famirī Bāsasu Yōkwai (Yōsuruni Yōkwai Dai Sensō)); 138. "Appointment Annoyances" (待ち合わせ事変, Machiawase Jihen); 139. "The 100 GF Spring Girlfriend Bread Festival" (100カノ春のパンまつり, Hyakkano Haru no Pan Matsuri); 140. "Woe! Yaku-san and the Appraisal Troupe" (悶絶! ヤクさん鑑定団, Monzetsu! Yaku-san Kantei Dan); 1. "Her First Physical Attacks Don't Work" (はじめてのぶつりじゃたおせない, Hajimete no Butsuri ja Taosenai)
17	March 18, 2024	978-4-08-893171-5	March 17, 2026	979-8-89373-747-9
141. "The Cat That Wants To Be Adopted" (拾われたい猫, Hirowaretai Neko); 142. "Meow Festival" (にゃんフェス, Nyan Fesu); 143. "A Cute and Obtuse Triangle" (姉妹三角形, Shimai Anguru); 144. "The Inda Family Secret" (院田家の秘密, Inda-ke no Himitsu); 145. "Rentarō Family's Dreams of Married Life" (恋太郎ファミリーの理想の結婚生活, Rentarō Famirī no Risō no Kekkon Seikatsu); 146. "And Then They Become Marriage" (そして彼らは結婚となる, Soshite Karera wa Kekkon to Naru); 147. "The Tama of a Wealthy Family (Are We in a Ghibli Movie Now?)" (金持ちの家のタマ (ジブリかな?), Kanemochi no Ie no Tama (Jiburi kana?)); 148. "Her Name. Returns (First Half)" (彼の名は。リターンズ（前半戦）, Kano no Na wa. Ritānzu (Zenhan Sen)); 149. "Her Name. Returns (Second Half)" (彼の名は。リターンズ（後半戦）, Kano no Na wa. Ritānzu (Kōhan Sen)); 1. "Her First Dream" (はじめてのゆめ, Hajimete no Yume)
18	June 19, 2024	978-4-08-893278-1	June 23, 2026	979-8-89373-748-6
150. "The Singer Singing in the Restroom" (トイレで歌ってた歌手, Toire de Utatteta Kashu); 151. "I Wanna Be the Most Abnormal" (めざせ奇人マスター, Mezase Kijin Masutā); 152. "The Rentarō Family's Idolmaking Project (2nd Generation)" (恋太郎ファミリーアイドル化計画(二代目), Rentarō Famirī Aidoru-ka Keikaku (Ni Dai Me)); 153. "Learn From Your Predecessors! Rentarō Family's Practice Drills" (先代に学ぶ! 恋太郎ファミリーの練習風景, Sendai ni Manabu! Rentarō Famirī no Renshū Fūkei); 154. "And Now, to a Brand New Radiance" (そして新たな輝きへ, Soshite Aratana Kagayaki e); 155. "Line Survival" (行列サバイバル, Gyōretsu Sabaibaru); 156. "Miss Naddy's 'Murrican Hug Date" (ナディー先生のアメーリカなハグデート, Nadī-sensei no Amērika na Hagu Dēto); 157. "Rentarō Family's Daily Life (Part 3)" (恋太郎ファミリーの日常 (その3), Rentarō Famirī no Nichijō (Sono San)); 158. "Kiki the Songstress and Master Uto's Teachings" (歌姫奇姫とマスター・ウトの教え, Utahime Kiki to Masutā Uto no Oshie); 1. "Her First Prodigy (and After)" (はじめてのきさい (のそのご), Hajimete no Kisai (no Sonogo))
19	September 19, 2024	978-4-08-893385-6	September 22, 2026	979-8-89561-406-8
159. "The Gothic Lolita Festival Girl" (ゴスロリお祭り少女, Gosurori Omatsuri Shōjo); 160. "Give You a Taste of Yakisoba That I Made" (あていの焼きそば食いねぃ, Atei no Yakisoba kui nei); 161. "A Dazzling Beauty That Illuminates All" (全てを照らす眩い美, Subete o Terasu Mabayui Hikari); 162. "The Ahren Channel's Secrets" (あーれんチャンネルの秘め事, Āren Channeru no Himegoto); 163. "Cloudy With a Chance of Headdress" (晴れ時々ヘッドドレス, Hare Tokidoki Heddodoresu); 164. "God Slayer: Kimetsu no Aiba — The Moving Passion: Mugen Shrine" (激情版「神滅の愛刃」無限神社編, Gekijō Ban "Kimetsu no Aiba" Mugen Jinja Hen); 165. "Rentarō Family's Daily Life (Part 4)" (恋太郎ファミリーの日常 (その4), Rentarō Famirī no Nichijō (Sono Yon)); 166. "The Beach Swordfighting Couple Tag Tournament" (ビーチチャンバラカップルタッグトーナメント, Bīchi Chanbara Kappuru Taggu Tōnamento); 167. "Everyone Was a Baby at Some Point Returns Returns" (みんな昔はベイビーだったリターンズリターンズ, Minna Mukashi wa Beibī datta Ritānzu Ritānzu); 1. "Her First Damn Me" (はじめてのばーろちくしょ, Hajimete no Bāro Chikusho))
20	December 18, 2024	978-4-08-893504-1	December 8, 2026	979-8-89561-407-5
168. "Rentarō Snapshot Swap Party" (恋太郎ブロマイド交換会, Rentarō Buromaido Kōkan-kai); 169. "The Girl That Slipped Right Into Rentarō Family's" (恋太郎ファミリーに紛れ込んでいた女, Rentarō Famirī ni Magirekonde Ita Onna); 170. "Mai and Momoha Become Maid Certified (Maybe)" (妹と百八のメイド検定 (多分), Mai to Momoha no Meido Kentei (Tabun)); 171. "The Stacked Woman—Ponytail—Knit Sweater Combo Chapter" (セクシーポニテニット回, Sekushī Ponite Nitto Kai); 172. "The Slender Lady—Pigtails—Pajamas Combo Chapter" (スレンダーおさげルームウェア回, Surendā Osage Rūmuwea Kai); 173. "The Small Girl—Hairbun—Overalls Combo Chapter" (ロリおだんごオーバーオール回, Rori Odango Ōbāōru Kai); 174. "Usa-chan is Clingy" (うさちゃんはべったり, Usa-chan wa Bettari); 175. "Rentarō Family's Daily Life (Part 5)" (恋太郎ファミリーの日常 (その5), Rentarō Famirī no Nichijō (Sono Go)); 176. "Kurumi Gorging at Deezney" (胡桃のくいだおれヂヅニー, Kurumi no Kuidaore Djidzunī); 1. "Her First Desolation" (はじめてのさみしぬ, Hajimete no Samishinu))
21	March 18, 2025	978-4-08-893590-4	March 9, 2027	979-8-89765-645-5
177. "Zetsubouda-san" (雪房田さん, Zetsubōda-san); 178. "Rentarō Family's World of Unknown Fairy Tales" (恋太郎ファミリーの知らないメルヘンの世界, Rentarō Famirī no Shiranai Meruhen no Sekai); 179. "Rentarō Family's Cherry Blossom Viewing" (恋太郎ファミリーのお花見, Rentarō Famirī no o Hanami); 180. "Rentarō Daily Life with his Girlfriends (Part 1)" (恋太郎と彼女の日常 (その1), Rentarō to Kanojo no Nichijō (Sono Ichi)); 181. "Rentarō Daily Life with his Girlfriends (Part 2)" (恋太郎と彼女の日常 (その2), Rentarō to Kanojo no Nichijō (Sono Ni)); 182. "Two Write to Write" (筆をとって、ふたり, Fude o Totte, Futari); 183. "Rentarō Family's Awesome Vacation Trip" (恋太郎ファミリーの楽しいバカンス旅行, Rentarō Famirī no Tanoshii Bakansu Ryokō); 184. "Rentarō Family's Sky Island Escape" (恋太郎ファミリーの空の島脱出, Rentarō Famirī no Sora no Shima Dasshutsu); 185. "Eira and Mei are the Same Age" (エイラと芽衣は同い年, Eira to Mei wa Onaidoshi); 1. "Her First Fairy Tale" (はじめてのめるへん, Hajimete no Meruhen))
22	June 18, 2025	978-4-08-893699-4	June 22, 2027	979-8-89765-646-2
186. "Ohana High's Shadow Bancho" (お花高の裏番長, Ohana-Kō no Ura Banchō); 187. "Rentarō Family's Brand New Bancho" (恋太郎ファミリーの新番長, Rentarō Famirī no Shin Banchō); 188. "Rentarō Daily Life with his Girlfriends (Part 3)" (恋太郎と彼女の日常 (その3), Rentarō to Kanojo no Nichijō (Sono San)); 189. "Saki's Senpai and Kouhai" (先の先輩と後輩, Saki no Senpai to Kōhai); 190. "Momiji's Gropeless Days" (紅葉の揉めない日々, Momiji no Momenai Hibi); 191. "Rentarō Family's Flowing Soumen" (恋太郎ファミリーの流しそうめん, Rentarō Famirī no Nagashi Sōmen); 192. "Rentarō Family's Daily Life (Part 6)" (恋太郎ファミリーの日常 (その6), Rentarō Famirī no Nichijō (Sono Roku)); 193. "Meme Knitting and Tama the Kitty / Meme and Kurumi's Back-Alley Expedition" (あみあみ愛々と猫のタマ／愛々と胡桃の路地裏探検隊, Amiami Meme to Neko no Tama / Meme to Kurumi no Roji Ura Tankentai); 194. "Yamame-chan's Outer Wildlife Preservation Diaries" (山女ちゃんと宇宙人保護日記, Yamame-chan to Uchūjin Hogo Nikki); 1. "Her First Senpai" (はじめてのせんぱい, Hajimete no Senpai))
23	September 19, 2025	978-4-08-893806-6	—	—
195. "The Sleepy Girl" (眠い少女, Nemui Shōjo); 196. "Rentarō Family's Sweet Dreams Party" (恋太郎ファミリーの寝顔パーティー♡, Rentarō Famirī no Negao Pātī); 197. "Rentarō Daily Life with his Girlfriends (Part 4)" (恋太郎と彼女の日常 (その4), Rentarō to Kanojo no Nichijō (Sono Yon)); 198. "The Theater of Thrills and Violence" (バイオレンスシアターは刺激がいっぱい, Baiorensu Siatā wa Shigeki ga Ippai); 199. "The Dog, the Daughter, and the Dad" (犬と娘とお父さん, Inu to Musume to Otōsan); 200. "The 100 Girlfriends Party" (100カノパーティ, Hyakkano Pātī); 201. "The 100 Girlfriends Party (Part 2)" (100カノパーティ(その2), Hyakkano Pātī (Sono Ni)); 202. "The 100 Girlfriends Party (Part 3)" (100カノパーティ(その3), Hyakkano Pātī (Sono San)); 203. "Rentarō Family's Daily Life (Part 7)" (恋太郎ファミリーの日常 (その7), Rentarō Famirī no Nichijō (Sono Nana)); 1. "Her First Shoemaking" (はじめてのくつづくり, Hajimete no Kutsu-zukuri))
24	December 18, 2025	978-4-08-894005-2	—	—
204. "Hasu-san the Great Detective" (名探偵の端須さん, Meitantei no Hasu-san); 205. "Great Detective Hasuha and the Mysterious Affair at Rentarō Family's" (名探偵蓮葉と恋太郎ファミリーの事件, Meitantei Hasuha to Rentarō Famirī no Jiken); 206. "Rentarō Daily Life with his Girlfriends (Part 5)" (恋太郎と彼女の日常 (その5), Rentarō to Kanojo no Nichijō (Sono Go)); 207. "The Three in Class 1-3" (1年3組の3人, Ichi Nen San Kumi no Sannin); 208. "The World of My Memories" (私の思い出の世界, Watashi no Omoide no Sekai); 209. "Even if the World Forgets You" (世界が君を忘れても, Sekai ga Kimi o Wasurete mo); 210. "Finding Girlfriends" (ファインディング・カノ, Faindingu Kano); 211. "Rentarō Family's Daily Life (Part 8)" (恋太郎ファミリーの日常 (その8), Rentarō Famirī no Nichijō (Sono Hachi)); 212. "Everyone Was a Baby at Some Point IV: The End of Mommyngelion" (みんな昔はベイビーだったIV:Mother/ままごころを､君に, Min'na Mukashi wa Beibī datta Fō:Mazā/Mama-gokoro o, Kimi ni); 1. "Her First Snoooof" (はじめてのくぅ~ん, Hajimete no Kū~n); 1. "Ouchytarou" (キツ太郎, Kitsutarou)
25	March 18, 2026	978-4-08-894131-8	—	—
213. "Morikita-sensei the Guidance Counselor" (生徒指導の守北先生, Seito Shidō no Morikita-sensei); 214. "Rentarō Family's After-School Snack" (恋太郎ファミリーの買い食い, Rentarō Famirī no Kai-gui); 215. "Rentarō Daily Life with his Girlfriends (Part 6)" (恋太郎と彼女の日常 (その6), Rentarō to Kanojo no Nichijō (Sono Roku)); 216. "The Distance Between Friends" (友達の距離感, Tomodachi no Kyori-kan); 217. "The Reason I Sing" (私の歌う理由, Watashi no Utau Riyū); 218. "The 100 Puzzle Chapter" (100パズ回, Hyappazu Kai); 219. "Missy Nemu's a Real Sleep Guardian, Ya Hear" (オー寧夢ガールはスリープガーディアンデース, Ō Nemu Gāru wa Surīpu Gādian Dēsu); 220. "Rentarō Family vs. Challenge Ramen (Round Two)" (恋太郎ファミリーVSチャレンジラーメン (Round 2), Rentarō Famirī Bāsasu Charenji Rāmen (Round 2)); 221. "Fare Ye Well, O Fine Forelocks" (旅立ちという名の前髪〜♪, Tabidachi to Iu Na no Maegami); 1. "Her First Friends" (はじめてのともだち, Hajimete no Tomodachi); 1. "Cranemari's Return of a Favor" (きまの恩返し, Kima no Ongaeshi)
26	July 17, 2026	978-4-08-894235-3	—	—
222. "The Twintails Girl" (ツインテールの少女, Tsuintēru no Shōjo); 223. "Rentarō Family's Twintails" (恋太郎ファミリーのツインテール, Rentarō Famirī no Tsuintēru); 224. "Rentarō Daily Life with his Girlfriends (Part 7)" (恋太郎と彼女の日常 (その7), Rentarō to Kanojo no Nichijō (Sono Nana)); 225. "The Junior High Homemaking Sleepover" (中一組の花嫁修業お泊まり女子会, Chū Ichi Gumi no Hanayome Shugyō Otomari Joshi Kai); 226. "Suu Says Math Sucks" (数は数学がクソ, Sū wa Sūgaku ga Kuso); 227. "Rentarō Family's vs. "Easter" at Loveney Land" (恋太郎ファミリーVSラヴィニーランド"イースター", Rentarō Famirī bāsasu Ravinī Rando "Īsutā"); 228. "At Last... The Dragon!" (ついに龍あらわる!?, Tsui ni Doragon Arawaru!?); 229. "Momoha-sensei was Raised in a Sake Shop" (百八先生は酒屋の娘, Momoha Sensei wa Sakaya no Musume); 230. "Siblings, Sisters, Senpai" (姉と長女と先輩, Ane to Chōjo to Senpai); 1. "The Three Little Pigs" (3匹の子ブタ, Sanbiki no Ko Buta)
27	September 17, 2026	978-4-08-894343-5	—	—
231. "Nurse Jiai" (保健室の慈相先生, Hokenshitsu no Jiai Sensei); 232. "A Day With Rentaro's Family and Nurse Jiai" (恋太郎ファミリーと保健室の先生の1日, Rentarō Famirī to Hokenshitsu no Sensei no Ichinichi); 233. "Rentarō Daily Life with his Girlfriends (Part 8)" (恋太郎と彼女の日常 (その8), Rentarō to Kanojo no Nichijō (Sono Hachi)); 234. "The Delinquent and The School Nurse" (不良少女と保健室の先生, Furyō Shōjo to Hokenshitsu no Sensei); 235. "Kusuri's Beloved Granny" (楠莉の大好きなおばあちゃん, Kusuri no Daisuki na Obāchan); 236. "Aijou Rentaro's Wish" (愛城恋太郎の願い, Aijō Rentarō no Negai); 237. "Mai's Hottie Heroine Paradise" (妹のイケメンヒロインパラダイス, Mai no Ikemen Hiroin Paradaisu); 238. "Rentarō Family's Daily Life (Part 9)" (恋太郎ファミリーの日常 (その9), Rentarō Famirī no Nichijō (Sono Kyū)); 239. "Totes, Naturally" (マジふふーんですわ, Maji fufūn desuwa); 1. "Her First Twintails" (はじめてのついんてーる, Hajimete no Tsuinteru); 1. "Her First Ba-crk" (はじめてのびきびき, Hajimete no Biki-Biki); 1. "The Tortoise and the Hare" (ウサギとカメ, Usagi to Kame)
28	December 17, 2026	978-4-08-894456-2	—	—
240. "The Classmate With Sanpaku Eyes" (三白眼のクラスメイト, Sanpakugan no Kurasumeito); 241. "Rentarō Family's and Kogoe's Favorite Thing" (恋太郎ファミリーと小々枝の好きなやつ, Rentarō Famirī to Kogoe no Sukina Yatsu); 242. "Rentarō Daily Life with his Girlfriends (Part 9)" (恋太郎と彼女の日常 (その9), Rentarō to Kanojo no Nichijō (Sono Kyū)); 243. "Spinning a Yarn, Carving a Tale" (編んだり切ったり紡がれて, Andari Kittari Tsumu ga rete); 244. "Story Time With Meru-sensei and the Angel" (める先生と天使の読み聞かせ会, Meru-sensei to Tenshi no Yomikikasekai); 245. "Rentarō Family's Daily Life (Part 10)" (恋太郎ファミリーの日常 (その10), Rentarō Famirī no Nichijō (Sono Jū)); 246. "Mei, Tamagoppi, and Family Ties" (芽衣とたまごっぴと繋がるファミリー, Mei to Tamagoppi to Tsunagaru Famirī); 247. "The Literature Girl's Strong and Cool Friend" (文学少女の強くてかっこいい友達, Bungaku Shōjo no Tsuyokute Kakkoī Tomodachi); 248. "Eira and Rentarō Are Scared of Ghosts" (エイラと恋太郎は幽霊が怖い, Eira to Rentarō wa Yūrei ga Kowai)

== Chapters not yet in tankōbon format ==
These chapters have yet to be published in a tankōbon volume.

249. "Fushida-san Is a Not-At-All Vulgar Class President" (伏ふし田ださんはふしだらじゃない委い員いん会ちょう, Fushida-san wa Fushidara Ja Nai Īnchō)
250. "Rentarō Vulgar Family" (恋太郎ファミリーはふしだら, Rentarō Famirī wa Fushidara)
251. "Rentarō Daily Life with his Girlfriends (Part 10)" (恋太郎と彼女の日常 (その10), Rentarō to Kanojo no Nichijō (Sono Jū))
252. "Butt, Sweat, and Tears" (汗あせと涙なみだのケツバット, Ase to Namida no Ketsubatto)
253. "Tama's Territorial Dispute" (タマの縄なわ張ばり争あらそい, Tama no Nawabari Arasoi)
254. "Rentarō Family's Daily Life (Part 11)" (恋太郎ファミリーの日常 (その11), Rentarō Famirī no Nichijō (Sono Jūichi))
255. "Hungry Hungry Haraga" (クルクル食クライシス, Kurukuru Kuraishisu)
256. "Suu, Rin, and Friday the 13th" (数と凛と13日の金曜日, Suu to Rin to Juusan-nichi no Kin'yōbi)
257. "Rentarō and Hakari-chan's Paternal Date" (恋太郎とはかりちゃんの父性デート, Rentarō to Hakari-chan no Fusei Dēto)
258. "Nuremi-senpai Wants to Swim" (濡ぬれ海み先せん輩ぱいは泳およぎたい, Nuremi-senpai wa Oyogitai)
259. "Rentarō Family's Sea Date (etc.)" (恋太郎ファミリーの海デート (以下略), Rentarō Famirī no Umi Deto (Ikaryaku))
260. "Rentarō Daily Life with his Girlfriends (Part 11)" (恋太郎と彼女の日常 (その11), Rentarō to Kanojo no Nichijō (Sono Jūichi))
261. "Finding Aye-o" (ファインディング・ダド, Faindingu dado)
