= Pepero Day =

Annual observance in South Korea

Pepero Day (Korean: 빼빼로 데이) is held annually on November 11, and is an observance in South Korea similar to Valentine's Day. It is the biggest annual day-marketing event in South Korea, and involves the gifting or exchange of Pepero snacks, a line of chocolate-dipped cookie sticks, with the intention of displaying affection for friends and loved ones. It is held on this day for the resemblance of Pepero sticks to the shortened date.

== History ==
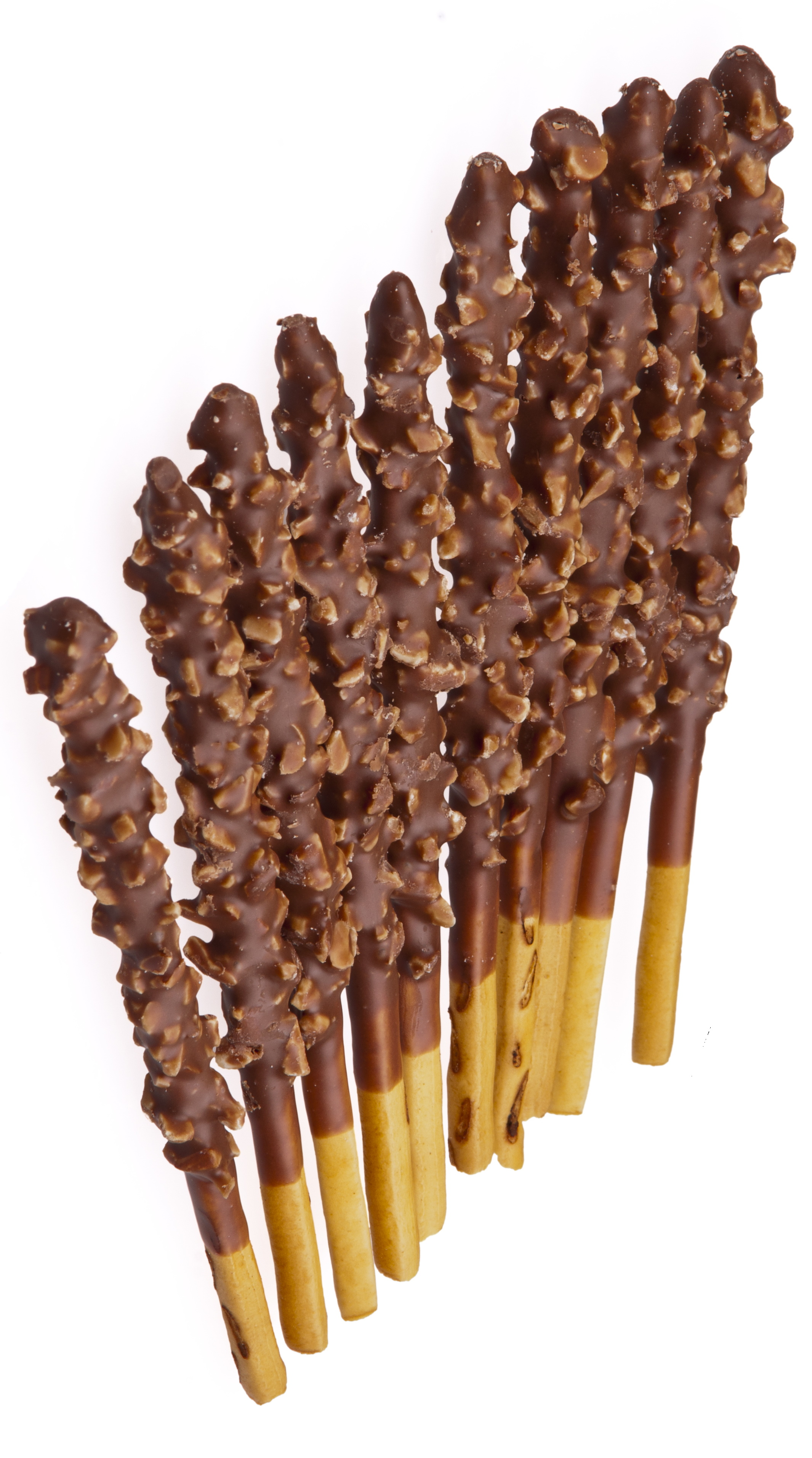
Pepero snacks

The exact origins of this day are unknown. The origins are usually traced to a news story set in 1983. In the story, two female middle school students in the Yeongnam region exchanged Pepero, wishing they would both become tall and thin. However, there is some doubt about this story. Some argue that the origin was due to the shape of 1's in the date (November 11 – 11/11) resembling Pepero sticks, while others attribute the similarity of shapes as factors that contributed to the popularity but not its origin.

The fad spread with the idea that, for maximum effectiveness for height and thinness, one must eat 11 packets of Pepero on November 11, 11:11 am and 11:11 pm at 11 seconds exactly. From 1997, Lotte started to use the aforementioned school story to successfully promote Pepero Day. The trend led to other companies creating similarly shaped snacks to participate in Pepero Day. As of 2012, Lotte was making 50% of its annual sales on Pepero Day. As of 2013, several department stores including Hyundai Department Store, Shinsegae, and Lotte Department Store were benefiting for people celebrating the day while stores such as E-mart and Homeplus were specially displaying and selling peperos on the day.

== Controversy ==
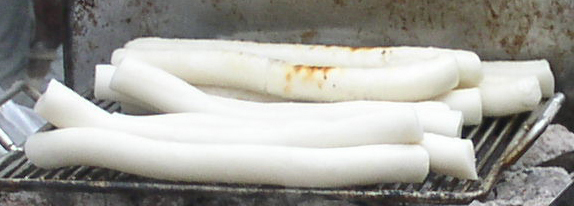
Garaetteok has been proposed as more healthy and less commercial alternative

Pepero Day has been criticized as a business tool and marketing strategy of certain companies, as well as for promoting unhealthy, fattening food that contradicts its original meaning (about becoming tall and thin). In addition, some say the day is an insult to hardworking farmers, as Farmers' Day, enacted in Korea in 1996 to promote farming, also falls on November 11.

Thus, the alternative "Garaetteok Day" has been proposed to promote the exchange of garaetteok (sticks of white tteok, a type of Korean rice cake), which, unlike pepero are commonly made and sold by smaller businesses.

== See also ==
- Pocky & Pretz Day – a similar celebration in Japan, also held on 11 November.
- Singles' Day – a somewhat similar celebration in China, also held on 11 November
