= The Monster with 21 Faces =

Alias for blackmail group

- かい人21面相
- Named after: Fictional villain
- Years active: 18 March 1984 – 12 August 1985
- Territory: Japan
- Activities: Kidnapping; Extortion; Attempted mass poisoning

The Monster with 21 Faces (怪人21面相, Kaijin Nijūichi Mensō) was a name (based on Edogawa Rampo's fictional villain The Fiend with Twenty Faces) used as an alias by the group responsible for the blackmail letters in the Glico Morinaga case in Japan, in 1984. Variations of the name's translation, including "the Mystery Man with the 21 Faces" and "the Phantom with 21 Faces", have also been used in articles and books featuring the case.

== Kidnapping of Katsuhisa Ezaki ==
At around 9:00 pm on 18 March 1984, two masked men armed with a pistol and rifle (later assumed to be toy guns) used a key stolen from the home next door to enter the home of Ezaki Glico president, Katsuhisa Ezaki. The home next door belonged to Katsuhisa's 70-year-old mother, Yoshie, and was located on the same property surrounded by a brick wall. The criminals had broken into her home and tied her up with a cut telephone line. They retrieved the key to her son's home which had a security system installed.

Having entered the home of Katsuhisa Ezaki, the two masked men tied up his wife Mikieko (35 years old) and his eldest daughter Mariko (7 years old). Mikieko offered the men money and one of them responded, "Be quiet. Money is irrelevant." After cutting some telephone lines the two masked men located Katsuhisa Ezaki who was bathing with his other two children, Yukiko (4 years old) and Etsuro (11 years old). Katsuhisa Ezaki was abducted naked from his home and taken to a warehouse in Ibaraki, Osaka.

Three days after his abduction, Ezaki was able to escape his captors after breaking free from the ropes they had tied him with. However he was unable to identify the culprits or provide police with any clues as to their motivations.

Several weeks after Ezaki's abduction, the group set fire to several vehicles at the company's headquarters. Then on 16 April 1984, a plastic container full of hydrochloric acid was found inside a Glico company building in Ibaraki, Osaka, the same city Ezaki was held captive in.

== Letters ==
=== Letters to Ezaki Glico ===
On 8 April 1984, The Monster with 21 Faces sent a letter to police, saying (English translation):

To Japanese police fools: Are you stupid? There's so many of you, what on earth are you doing? If you are real pros try catching me. There’s too much handicap so I will give you a hint. There's no fellows in the Ezaki’s relatives, there's no fellows in Nishinomiya police, there's no fellows in Flood fighting corps. Car I used is gray, food was bought at Daiei. If you want a new info, beg for it in the newspaper. After telling you all this you should be able to catch me. If you don't you are tax thieves. Shall I kidnap the head director of the prefectural police?

Although the letter told police the color of the vehicle they had driven while kidnapping Ezaki, as well as the supermarket they had bought the food used to feed him during his captivity, these clues provided little assistance to authorities.

Meanwhile, the Monster with 21 Faces also sent letters to the media, taunting police efforts to capture the culprit(s) behind the scare. An excerpt from one such letter, written in hiragana and with an Osaka dialect, reads, "Dear dumb police officers. Don't tell a lie. All crimes begin with a lie as we say in Japan. Don't you know that?"

Another letter sent by the Monster with 21 Faces that was received on 23 April was sent to both Sankei and Mainichi newspapers as well as the Koshien police station. It read:

To police fools: You shouldn't lie. If you lie, you steal. I also sent this to the Koshien police. Why are you lying. Don't hide things. Why are you complaining? You guys are having such a hard time, so I will give you a hint. I entered the factory from the side staff entrance. The typewriter we used is PAN-writer. The plastic container used was a piece of street garbage. Monster with 21 faces"

The Monster with 21 Faces sent its first letter on May 10 to the giant food company Ezaki Glico following the kidnapping and escape of Katsuhisa Ezaki, president of Glico. The letter stated it had laced $21 million worth of the company's confections with potassium cyanide soda, and it later threatened to put them on store shelves. None of these poisoned candies were found, but Glico products were removed from stores, resulting in a loss of more than $20 million and the laying off of 450 part-time workers. By the end of the whole ordeal, Glico reported a total decrease in sales of nearly $130 million.

On 26 June, the Monster with 21 Faces issued a message proclaiming its forgiveness of Glico, and subsequent harassment of the company ceased.

=== Letters to Morinaga ===
After ceasing its harassment of Glico, the Monster with 21 Faces began targeting Morinaga, another confectionery company, and food companies Marudai Ham and House Food Corporation with similar criminal campaigns, using the same alias.

In October 1984, a letter addressed to "Moms of the Nation" and signed by the Monster with 21 Faces was sent to Osaka news agencies with a warning similar to those sent to Glico. It stated that 20 packages of Morinaga candy had been laced with deadly sodium cyanide. After receiving this letter, police searched stores in cities from Tokyo to western Japan and found over a dozen lethal packages of Morinaga Choco Balls and Angel Pie before anyone was poisoned. These packages had labels, such as "Danger: Contains Toxins", put on them. More tampered confections were found in February 1985 for a total of 21 lethal sweet products.

On 1 November 1984 a threatening letter from the Monster with 21 Faces arrived at the Tokyo home of Morinaga Dairy vice president Mitsuo Yamada:

To President: You saw our power didn't you? If you disobey us we will destroy your company. You will get killed. Decide whether you want to give us money or do you want to see your company destroyed? Tell us in the Mainichi Newspaper on either the 5th or 6th of November. Use the missing persons. Use these words in the reply: Jiro, Morinaga, Mother, Police, Bad friend, Money, Meal. As we said before we want two hundred million yen. Monster with 21 faces"

Morinaga responded on 6 November to the criminals by placing the missing persons advertisement in the Mainichi Newspapers Morning Edition: "Dear Jiro, Bad friend disappeared. Come back. Warm meal is waiting. Mother Chiyoko."

Two letters from the Monster with 21 Faces were sent to House Foods on 7 November. Furthermore, Morinaga & Company was forced to reduce its current production by 90% that day due to the poisoning.

=== Death of Superintendent Yamamoto and cessation of letters ===
Unable to capture the suspect believed to be the mastermind behind the Monster with 21 Faces, the police superintendent Yamamoto of Shiga Prefecture died by self-immolation in August 1985. Five days after this event, on August 12, "the Monster" sent its final message to the media:

Yamamoto of Shiga Prefecture Police died. How stupid of him! We've got no friends or secret hiding place in Shiga. It's Yoshino or Shikata who should have died. What have they been doing for as long as one year and five months? Don't let bad guys like us get away with it. There are many more fools who want to copy us. No-career Yamamoto died like a man. So we decided to give our condolence. We decided to forget about torturing food-making companies. If anyone blackmails any of the food-making companies, it's not us but someone copying us. We are bad guys. That means we've got more to do other than bullying companies. It's fun to lead a bad man's life. Monster with 21 Faces.

After this letter, the Monster with 21 Faces was not heard from again. The statute of limitation for the kidnapping of Katsuhisa Ezaki, president of Glico, ran out in June 1995, and the statute of limitation for the attempted poisonings ran out in February 2000. At one point, it was even estimated that over a million police officers had worked on the case in some capacity or another over the years, chasing down more than 28,000 tips and investigating nearly 125,000 persons-of-interest. However, no suspect was ever charged.

== Major suspects ==
=== "The Videotaped Man" ===
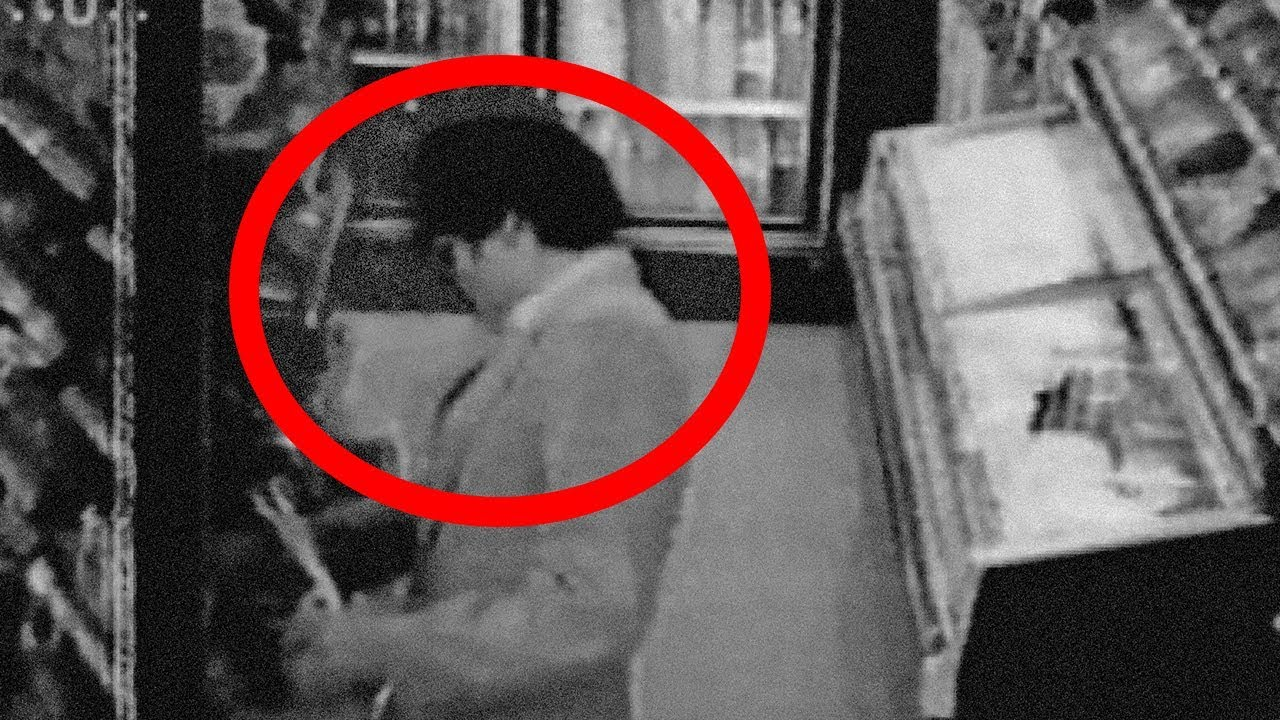
The released image of the "Videotaped Man"

Following threats by the Monster with 21 Faces to poison Glico confections and the resulting mass withdrawal of Glico products from shelves, a man wearing a Yomiuri Giants baseball cap was caught placing Glico chocolate on a store shelf by a security camera. This man was believed to be behind the Monster with 21 Faces. The security camera photo was made public after this incident.

=== "The Fox-eyed Man" ===
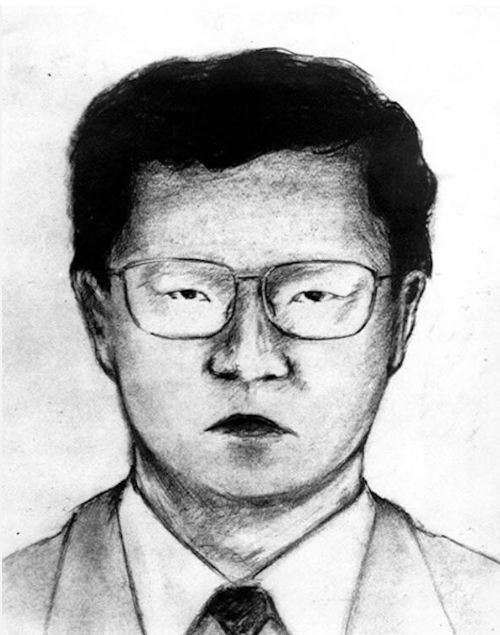
The Fox-eyed Man

On 28 June 1984, two days after the Monster agreed to stop harassing Marudai Ham in exchange for 50 million yen, police came close to capturing the suspected mastermind. An investigator disguised himself as a Marudai employee and followed the Monster's instructions for the money exchange. As he was riding a train to the money's drop point, he noticed a suspicious man watching him. He was described as a large, well-built man wearing sunglasses and with his hair cut short and permed. He was also quoted to have "eyes like those of a fox". As investigators tailed him from train to train, the Fox-eyed Man (キツネ目の男, kitsune-me no otoko) eventually eluded them. In a later incident, investigators saw the Fox-eyed Man again, accompanying the alleged "Monster" group during another secret money exchange with House Food Corporation. Once again, he was able to elude police and avoid capture.

=== Manabu Miyazaki ===
Tokyo Metropolitan Police at first identified Manabu Miyazaki, the son of a known yakuza boss and a criminal himself, as the Fox-eyed Man and the Videotaped Man because of his resemblance to these suspects. Miyazaki had also been involved with a labor dispute with Glico about ten years prior. However, after his alibis were checked, he was cleared of the Glico-Morinaga crimes, though some still suspect he could have been involved with the group.

== See also ==
- List of fugitives from justice who disappeared
- Paraquat murders
