= Pocky =

Japanese snack food

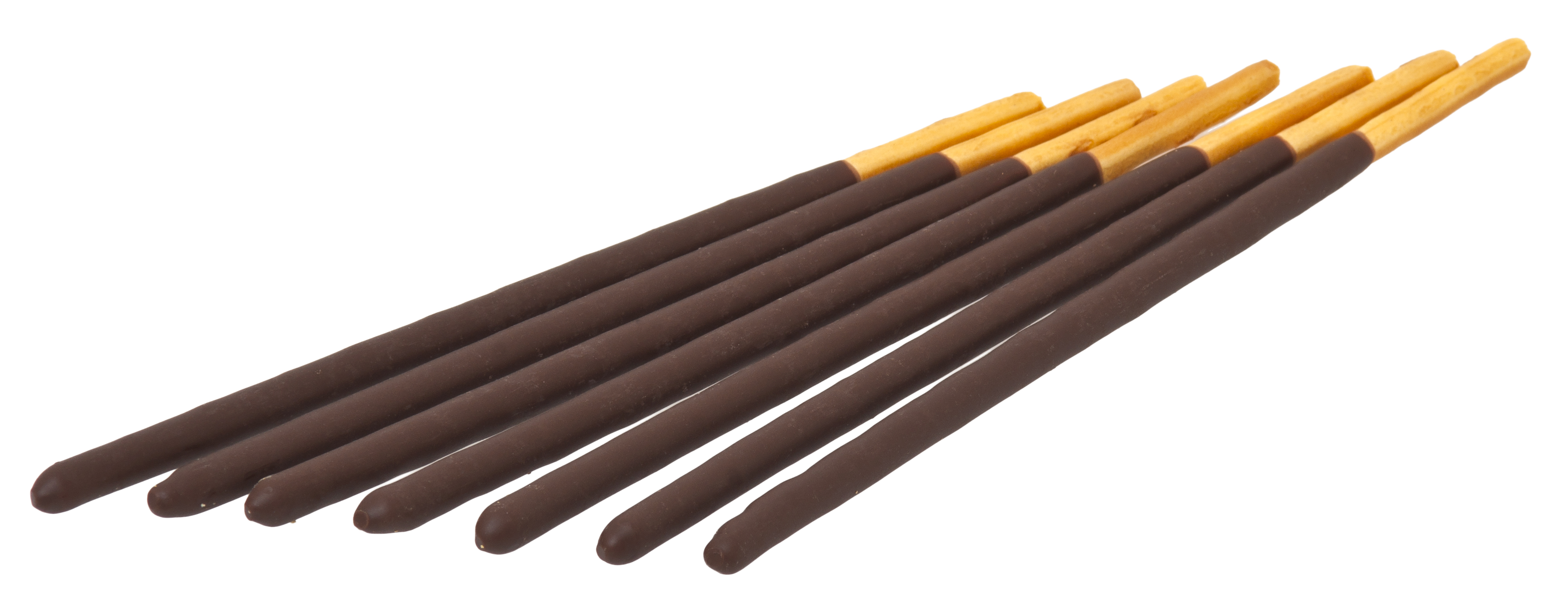
- Sticks of original (chocolate) Pocky
- Place of origin: Japan
- Created by: Glico
- Invented: 1966; 60 years ago
- Main ingredients: Biscuit stick, chocolate

Pocky (ポッキー, Pokkī; Japanese pronunciation: [poꜜkkiː]) /ˈpɒki/ is a Japanese sweet snack food produced by the Ezaki Glico food company. Pocky was first sold in 1966. It consists of coated biscuit sticks. It was named after the Japanese onomatopoeic word pokkiri (ポッキリ), which is supposed to resemble the sound of the snack being cracked.

The original chocolate-coated Pocky was followed by an almond-coated variant in 1971, and a strawberry coating in 1977. Today, the product line includes variations in the flavored coatings, such as milk, mousse, matcha (green tea), honey, banana, cookies and cream, strawberry and coconut, and themed products such as "Decorer Pocky", with colorful decorative stripes in the coating, and "Men's Pocky", a mature dark (bittersweet) chocolate version.

== Flavors and variations ==
Pocky logo

Pocky can be found in dozens of varieties such as chocolate, strawberry, and almond. Some of the more unusual flavors include the seasonal flavors of honey (spring) and kiwifruit mango (summer). The bittersweet version of chocolate Pocky is known as Men's Pocky. Regional flavors of Pocky include grape (Nagano), yūbari melon (Hokkaidō), giant mikan (tangerine, sold in the Kyūshū region), powdered tea azuki bean (Kyoto), Kobe wine (Kobe), and five-fusion berry (Goka). Also, flavors such as banana, lychee, coffee, caramel, marble royal milk tea, melon, Daim bar (sold in the UK), milk, honey and milk, cream cheese, berry, sweet potato, coconut, crush (crunchy cracker pieces in chocolate), corn on the cob, pineapple, pumpkin, kurogoma (black sesame), kinako (soybean flour), Brazilian pudding, cherry, tomato, orange, mikan, blueberry, apple yogurt, hazelnut, mixed berry and green tea are available.

Other variations include Pocky G (marketed as being "hard and rich"), Giant Pocky (strawberry- and chocolate-flavored; each box contains 20 individually wrapped sticks with real dried strawberry; each stick is about 10" long, and about three times the diameter of a normal Pocky stick), Giant Dream Pocky (box of 20 individually wrapped 10" sticks; each stick is in one of the five featured flavors of melon, grape, green tea, strawberry or standard chocolate), Sakura Pocky (limited edition that is part of the Luxury Chocolatier sub-group; each stick is coated with pink cherry blossom essenced chocolate sprinkled with a bit of salt), Reverse Pocky (cracker on the outside with the filling in the middle), Fortune-Telling Pocky (each stick contains a "fortune"), and Pocky Cake (a literal cake shaped to look like a Pocky stick. Each cake contains, according to its packaging, raisins, chocolate cream, orange peel, and an Italian cake batter).

Pretz, also made by Ezaki Glico, is an unglazed version of Pocky, featuring flavors like tomato, pizza, and salad, as well as sweet flavors such as cocoa and French toast.

== World distribution ==
Original design of "Pocky" prior to 2014 in Malaysia, released under the brand name "Rocky"

Pocky is a very popular treat in Japan, especially among teenagers. In bars, it is sometimes served with a glass of ice water or milk. It also has a significant presence in other Asian countries, such as China, South Korea, Thailand, Indonesia, the Philippines, Laos, Malaysia, Singapore, Hong Kong, Taiwan, India, Myanmar, Brunei, and Vietnam. In Malaysia, Pocky was sold under the name "Rocky" for five decades. It was rebranded under the name "Pocky" in 2014, along with a new package design and slogan. Commercials featuring Malaysian singer Yuna, also began to air in 2015 in order to give brand recognition and a sales boost.

Mikado (United Kingdom)

In Europe, Pocky is produced under license by Mondelēz International and sold under the name "Mikado" in Austria, Belgium, France, Germany, Greece, Italy, Ireland, Luxembourg, Spain, Switzerland, the Netherlands, and the United Kingdom. "Mikado" can be found at most supermarkets and many international food stores. The name comes from the game of the same name. It is played with thin & long sticks, hence the name. In Turkey, Pocky is produced by Ülker and Şölen, under Biskrem Bi'stik and Biscolata Stix name.

In the United States and Canada, Pocky can be found in Asian supermarkets and the international section of most large supermarkets; such retailers include World Market, H-E-B, Wegmans, Kroger, Jungle Jim's International Market, Costco, Walmart (in the Asian foods aisle), some Target stores, some Walgreens, Meijer, Fiesta, Barnes & Noble, and anime convention dealers' rooms. In the United States, Pocky is marketed both by LU (in chocolate and peanut butter flavors), and by Ezaki Glico's American division, Ezaki Glico USA Corporation (in chocolate and strawberry flavors).

In Australia and New Zealand, it is usually sold in Asian convenience markets, along with other Asian foods and products. Like the United States and Canada these are also widely available in the international sections on the Asian food aisles of most supermarket chains. Specialty importers also exist in Australia and New Zealand.

In 2020, Pocky was certified by Guinness World Records as the "largest chocolate-coated biscuit brand" after hitting over 500 million dollars in sales in the past year.

== Controversies ==
=== Glico Morinaga case ===
In 1984, a blackmail group known as The Monster with 21 Faces threatened to poison confections produced by Glico and by Morinaga, resulting in a mass withdrawal of Glico products from shelves. Subsequently, a man wearing a Yomiuri Giants baseball cap was caught placing Glico chocolate on a store shelf by a security camera. This man was believed to be the mastermind behind the group. The security camera photo was made public after this incident.

=== Melamine contamination ===
On September 30, 2008, Hong Kong authorities announced that melamine had been detected in Pocky Men's coffee cream-coated biscuit sticks made in China. Ezaki Glico had no immediate comment on the reported contamination. The melamine contamination level was found to be 43 ppm (the legal limit is 2.5 ppm). On October 17, 2008, Pocky Men's coffee cream-coated biscuit sticks were banned in Sri Lanka by the country's health ministry alongside 59 other products containing melamine.

== See also ==
- Pocky & Pretz Day
- Glico Morinaga case
- Konpa
- Pepero
- Pretzel sticks
- Pretzels
- List of Japanese snacks
- Cadbury Fingers
- Toppo
- Yan Yan (snack)
