= Toppo (food) =

Chocolate and bread-based snack made by Lotte

Toppo (Japanese: トッポ), also known as "reverse pocky", is a chocolate and bread-based snack made by Lotte. Normally it consists of a hollowed bread stick with a filling of chocolate. Flavors include chocolate, "black" (chocolate flavored breadstick with a vanilla filling), "blue" (regular breadstick with a vanilla filling), green tea, strawberry, coffee mousse and many other seasonal flavors.

== See also ==
- Chocolate in Japan
