= Pepero =

Cookie stick snack from South Korea

Pepro
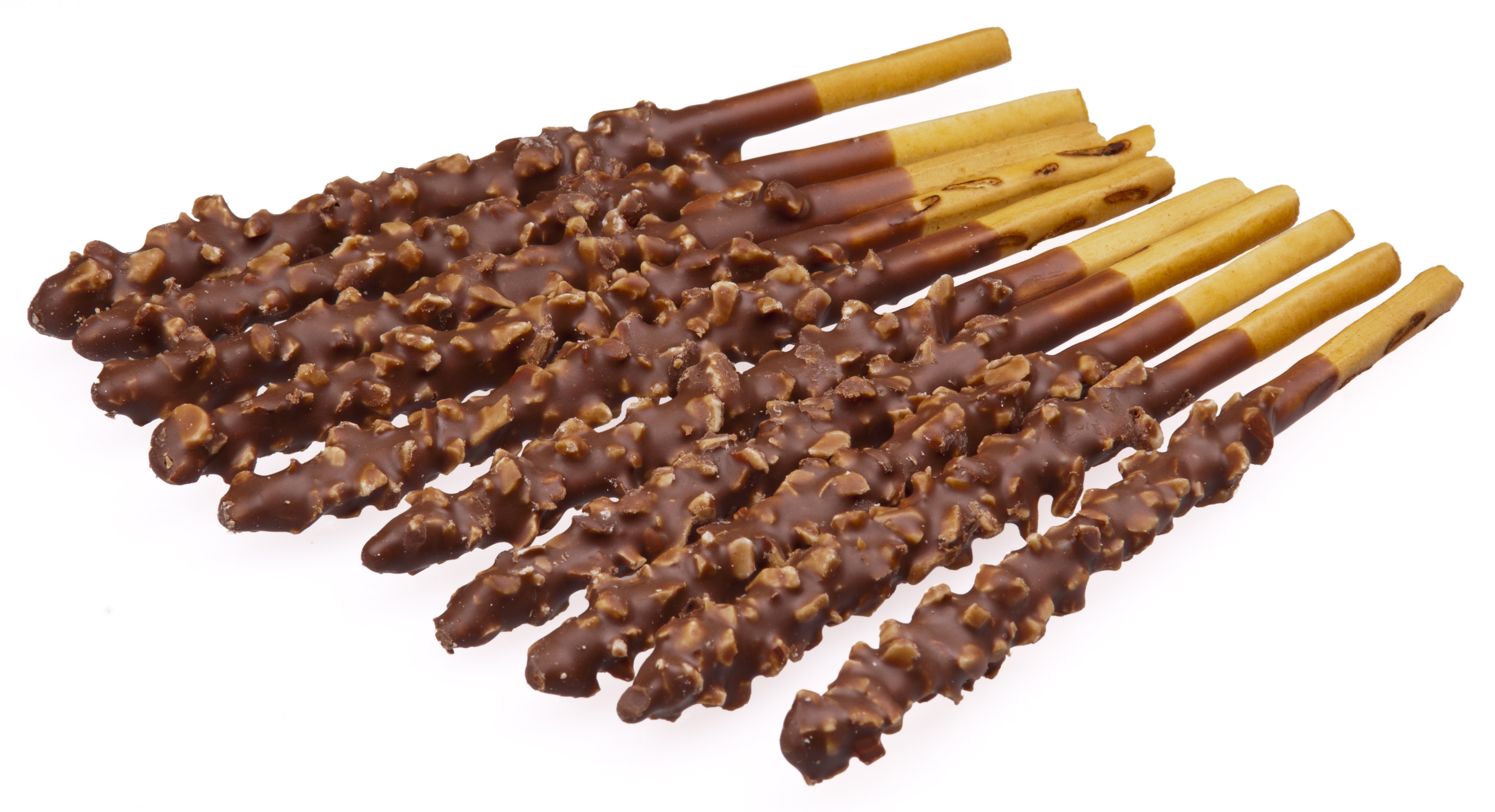
- Pepero Almond sticks
- Course: Confectionery, dessert, snack
- Place of origin: South Korea
- Similar dishes: Snack

Pepero (Korean: 빼빼로), also "chocolate-covered pretzel stick", is a thin cookie stick dipped in compound chocolate. Pepero has been manufactured by Lotte Wellfood in South Korea since 1983. Pepero is mostly made up of cocoa mass and flour. It is exported to approximately 64 countries worldwide and is especially popular in Singapore, Malaysia, India and the Philippines. Pepero has been awarded numerous times for its sales and designs.

== Flavors ==
Pepero is manufactured in several flavors (as of 2024):

- Chocolate (original)
- Strawberry (South Korea only)
- Almond (coated with chocolate and almond bits)
- Choco-filled (Pepero cookie stick filled with chocolate; the opposite of an original chocolate Pepero)
- Plain cream cheese
- White + cookie (white cream covered, with cookie bits; cookies and cream)
- Peanut (US only)
- Haenam sweet potatoes (will be available later in South Korea)
- Haenam Green Tea
- Crunchy
- Choco Cookie
- Crunky
- Crunky Granola
- Snowy Almond (coated with white chocolate and almond bits)
- Pepero Skinny ( A thin version of the Original Chocolate Pepero )

== Marketing ==
The most prominent marketing strategy that Lotte Confectionery Corporation implements is held annually on November 11. The marketing strategy company takes improves every year. Due to COVID-19, sales have been difficult. Hence, the company made an adjustment in marketing by live broadcast and delivery. Lotte Confectionery Corporation launched an exotic ice cream 'Pepero-bar' for a limited time. Ice cream 'Pepero-bar' has used the originality feature of Pepero by covering it with almond and displaying "Pepero friends" character as packaging to attract consumers.

== Sales ==
About 60% of the annual Pepero sales occur around Pepero Day, which is held on November 11. Pepero sales have reached a record high of about 1.1 trillion won in terms of supply prices until 2016. Pepero has successfully settled in the market by advertising Pepero Day. On average, Pepero's daily sales on Pepero Day are about 84 times higher than usual. Lotte Confectionery Corporation actively participates in social contribution with its profits on Pepero since the sales increase every year. The major export regions, such as Singapore, China, Russia, and the United States, play a big stake in Pepero's sales.

== Awards ==
- Watsons Best Selling Snack Award- 2012
- Watsons Best Selling Biscuit Award- 2014
- Watsons Best Selling Korean Biscuit Award- 2015
- Germany's Red Dot Design Award- 2019
- Germany's iF Design Award- 2020

== Social contribution ==
The company donates Pepero to needy neighbors and social organizations. With its record sales and profits, Lotte contributes to establish the local children's center.

== Criticism ==
Pepero has been criticized for copying Pocky, which has been manufactured by Japan's Ezaki Glico Company since 1966. Lotte denies that it was inspired by the product. The Pocky product was introduced over 17 years before in the market. Ezaki Glico's Pocky and Lotte Confectionery's Pepero have a long history and known as rival companies in terms of breadsticks. Since the content of Pocky and Pepero is the same, it is difficult to distinguish the difference between the two products. Ezaki Glico filed a lawsuit against Lotte Confectionery about the trademark, and the shape of the originality of Pocky since Pocky has entered the United States market before Lotte Confectionery's Pepero. Lotte Confectionery could design partially chocolate-based snacks in a different shape from Pocky. However, the court saw that only this factor could not offset the functionality of Pocky's design. Lotte Confectionery Corporation won the case because the judge concluded that Pocky's product appearance cannot be protected by trade dress due to its functionality.

In 2014, Glico sued Lotte which allegedly copied packaging box design of Glico's Baton d'or exclusive series of Pocky and Pretz for Lotte's new product Premier Pepero. On 14 August 2015, Seoul district court ruled that Lotte stole the box design of Glico's products and the ruling is expected to force Lotte to halt its sales of the product and dispose of the existing stock.

On July 10, 2015, Glico filed a lawsuit in the U.S. District Court against Lotte USA for infringing on the trademarks of Pocky. Glico had registered the Pocky's three-dimensional trademarks prior to the launch of Pepero in the U.S.

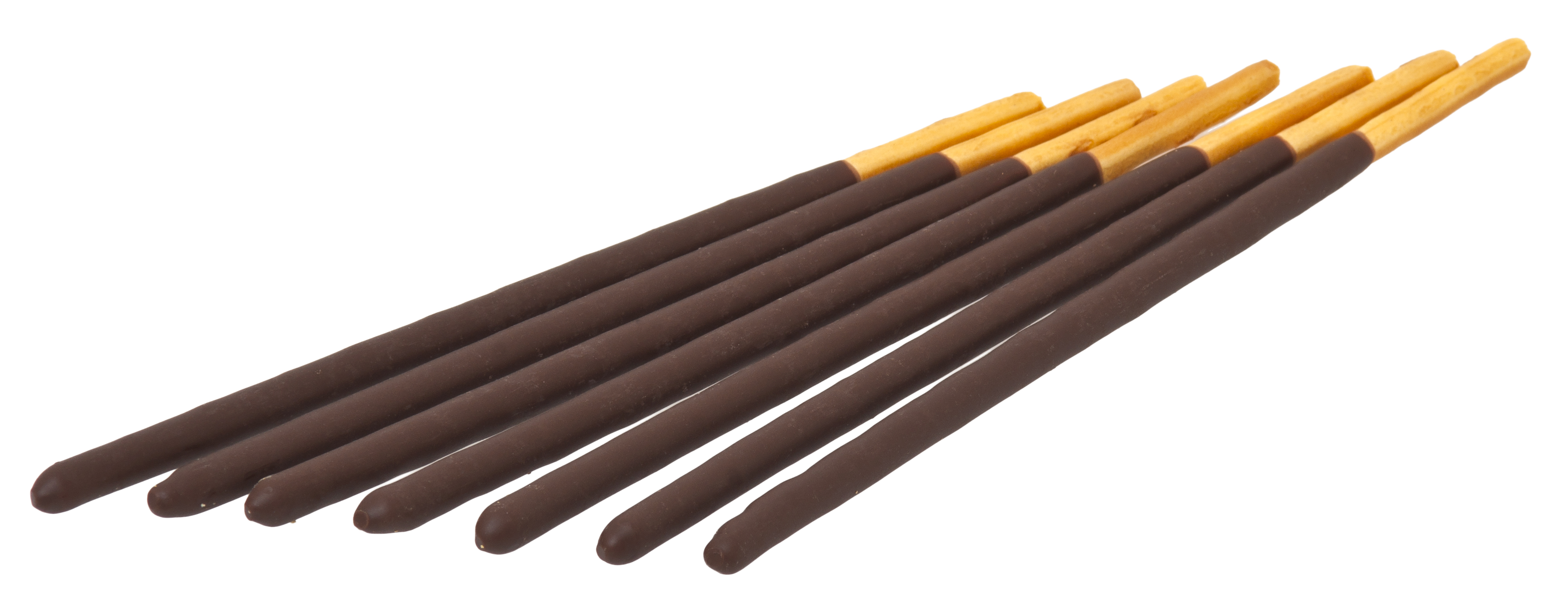
Pocky was first released by Ezaki Glico, a Japanese confectionery company, in 1966, 17 years before the introduction of Pepero.

== Pepero Day ==
The date is set to November 11, annually. Farmer's Day is also held in November 11 and referred it as a Garae Tteok Day. Pepero Day was derived from a middle school girl student in Yeongnam district of South Korea. They exchanged Pepero by saying "let's be tall and skinny" with well-wishing remarks. Nowadays, couples make Pepero or purchase it from the market in exchange with their gratitude to convey affection. As Pepero Day comes to date, the sales of manufacturing companies drastically increase.
