= Younger Sister's Day =

Japanese observance

- Observed by: Japan
- Type: Secular
- Significance: celebrates the affection towards younger sisters from siblings and family
- Date: September 6
- Frequency: Annual
- First time: 1991; 34 years ago
- Started by: Kunio Hatada
- Related to: Father's Day; Mother's Day; Siblings Day

Younger Sister's Day (妹の日, Imōto no Hi) is a Japanese holiday established by manga artist and author Kunio Hatada in 1991, celebrated on September 6 of each year.

== History ==
The holiday was coined around 1991, after several works were published by Hatada delving into research about 'brother and sister types', such as "The Power of Younger Sisters—a Sociological study". Among his findings, he saw that women who succeed in activities such as sports and entertainment tend to be younger sisters themselves.

The specific date was chosen based on the astrological sign of Virgo, which Hatada considered representative of the 'universally loved sweetness symbolized by little sisters'. In particular, he explained that September 6 was designated because it's exactly one day before the Virgo constellation is halfway through its average commonly accepted length, from August 23 to September 22.

In 1992, a committee was designated with the task of promoting this holiday.

== Related events ==
A competition was held during the first iteration of the holiday in 1991, titled "Japan's Little Sister Grandprize", resulting in winners Yuko Arimori and Gin Kanie.

In 2018, the voice cast and character sheets for upcoming anime My Sister, My Writer was revealed to the public on that year's Younger Sister's day.

Around the same holiday in 2019, a special consecutive run of two little sister-related anime, Oreimo and Eromanga Sensei, was aired on TV streaming website Abema. In 2020, the company announced their plans to add two more shows featuring little sister characters to their Younger Sister's day special broadcast, specifically Yosuga no Sora and Himouto! Umaru-chan, which would be available for free on the platform.
