= Pocky & Pretz Day =

Annual observance in Japan

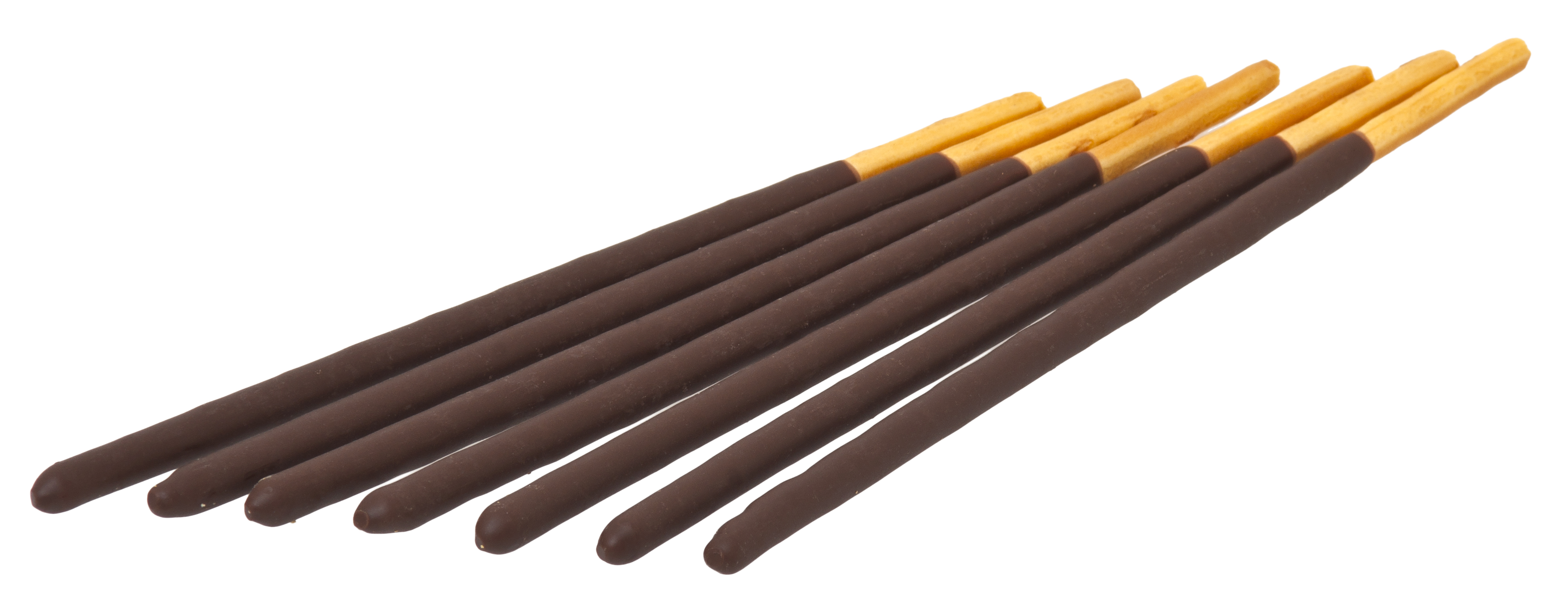
Chocolate flavoured Pocky

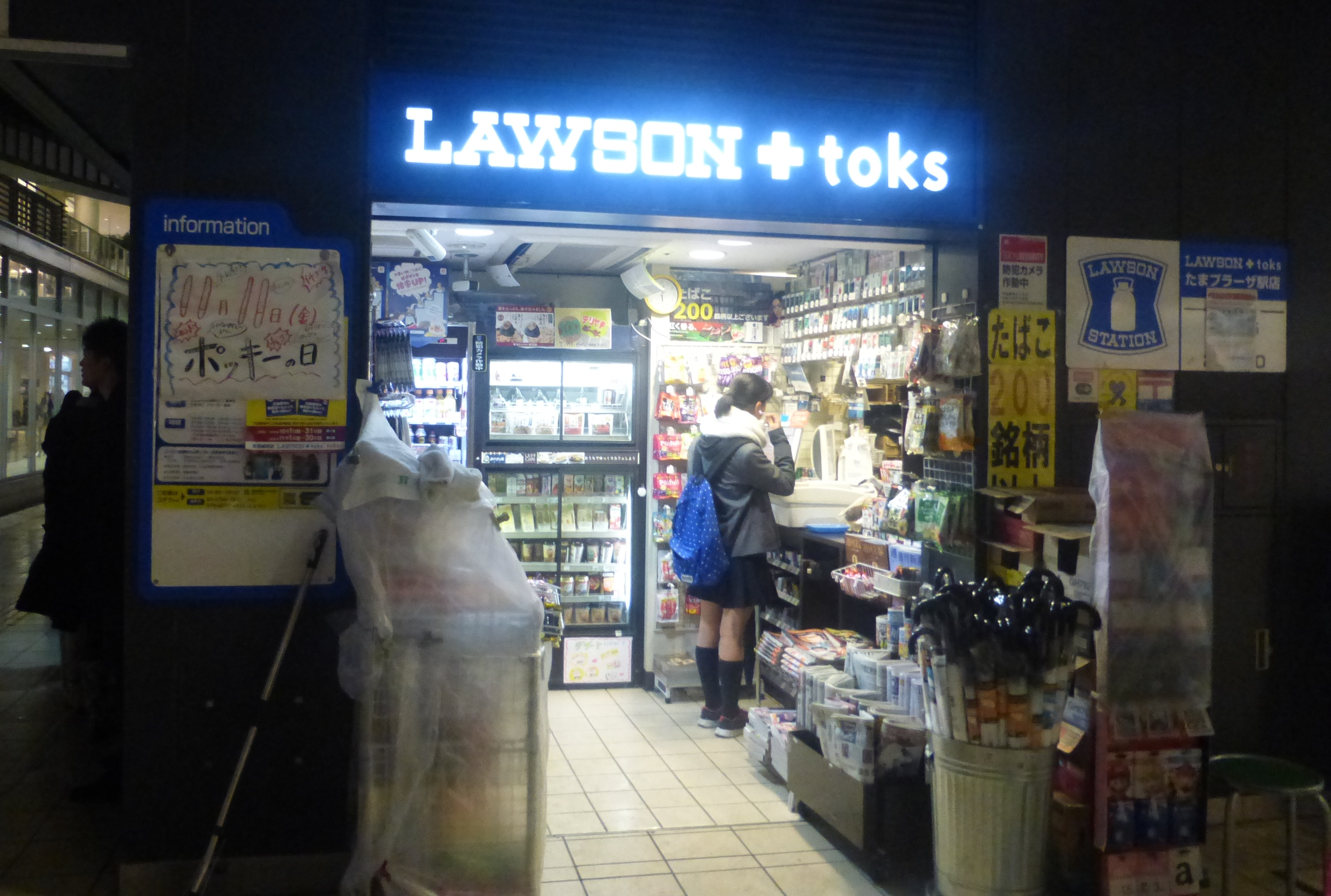
A hand written sign advertising "Pocky Day" (left), in front of a small Japanese convenience store

Pocky & Pretz Day (ポッキー＆プリッツの日, Pokkii & Purittsu no hi) is a Japanese marketing event that occurs on 11 November each year. The event uses the Ezaki Glico products Pocky and Pretz, which are both long and thin biscuits, to represent the repeated number 1 in the numerical date (i.e. the 11th day of the 11th month). Ezaki Glico has deployed an advertising campaign surrounding the date each year since 1999. Pocky & Pretz Day has been certified as a memorial day by the Japan Anniversary Association (日本記念日協会, Nihon Kinenbi Kyoukai).

== Guinness World Record ==
On 11 November 2012, the campaign attempted to set a world record for the "Most mentions of a brand name on Twitter in 24 hours". "Pocky" was mentioned 1,843,733 times that day and the new record was certified by the Guinness World Records. The record was surpassed the following year when it reached 3,710,044 mentions on 11 November 2013.

== See also ==
- Pepero Day, a similar event in South Korea, held on the same day
