= Classics Day =

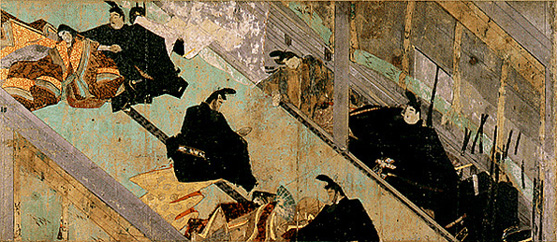
- Observed by: Japan
- Date: November 1
- Next time: 1 November 2026
- Frequency: Annual

Classics Day (古典の日, Koten no Hi) is a day held annually in Japan on November 1 for the purpose of promoting classical works.

The day was declared by the Committee for the Thousandth Anniversary of The Tale of Genji on November 1, 2008. This date was the 1000th anniversary since The Tale of Genji was mentioned in The Diary of Lady Murasaki. Classics Day was legislated in 2012. According to the law, the classics includes literature, music, art, performing arts, lifestyle, and products in the fields of academia and philosophy.

Events are held in Japan on Classics day. These themes include classical culture affecting Japan such as classical music and the game of Go.
