= Pretzel sticks =

Snack food

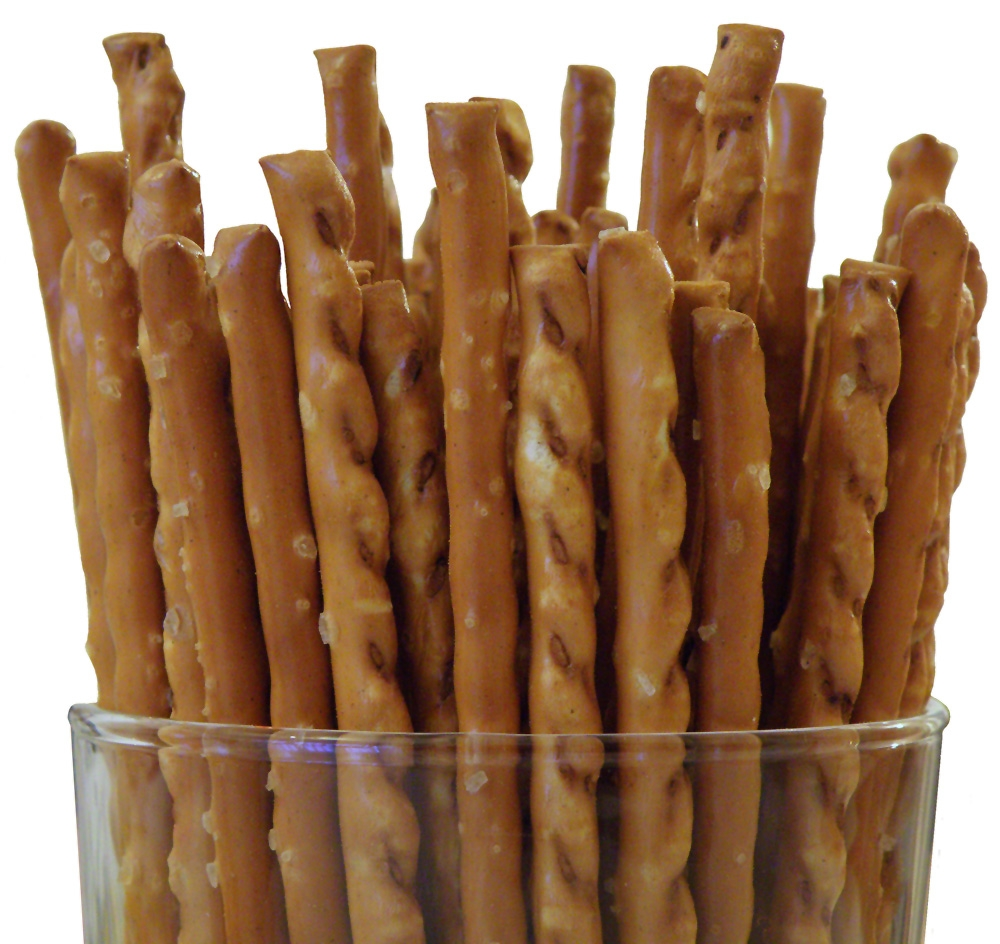
Pretzel sticks in a glass

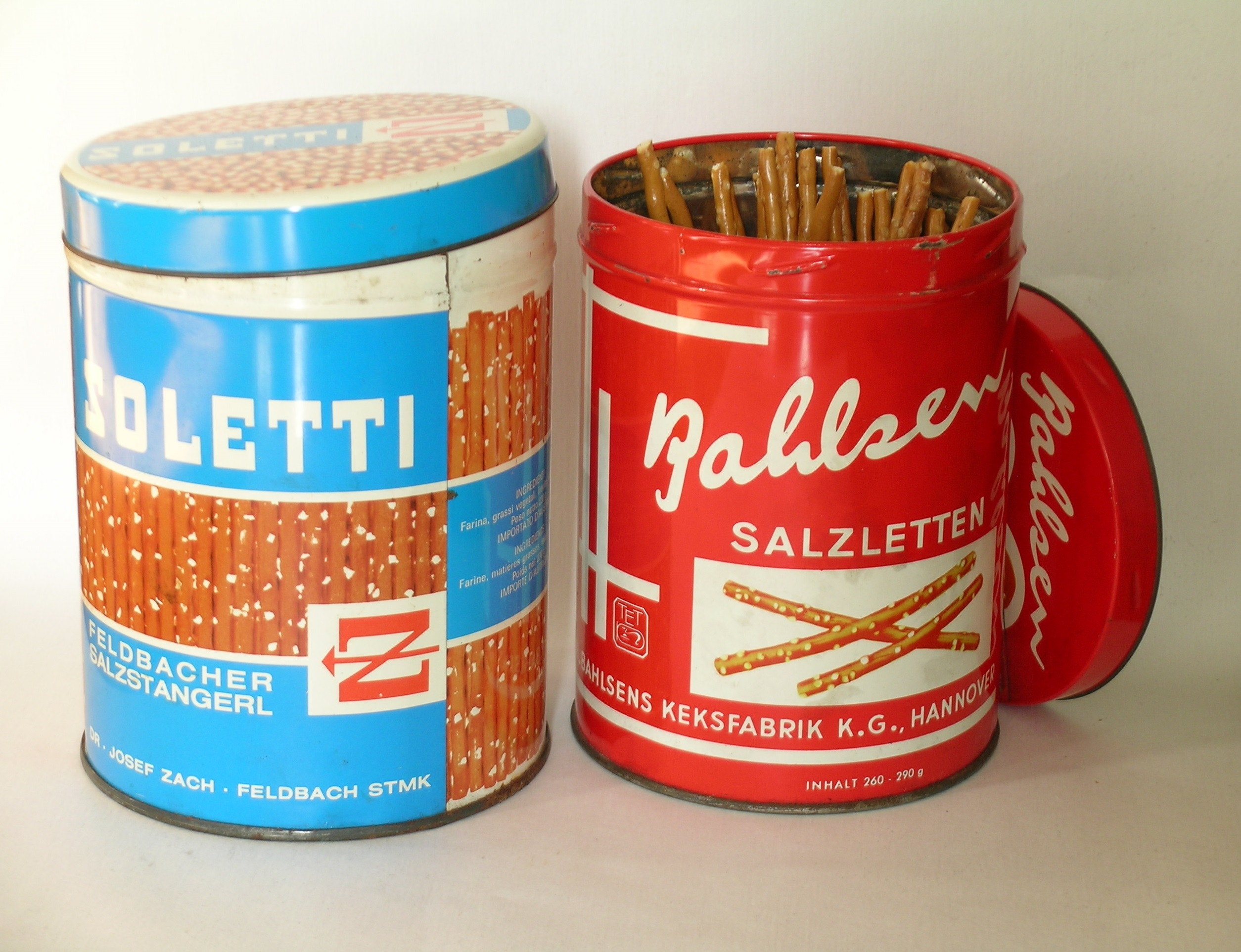
Historical tins of Soletti and Bahlsen pretzel sticks

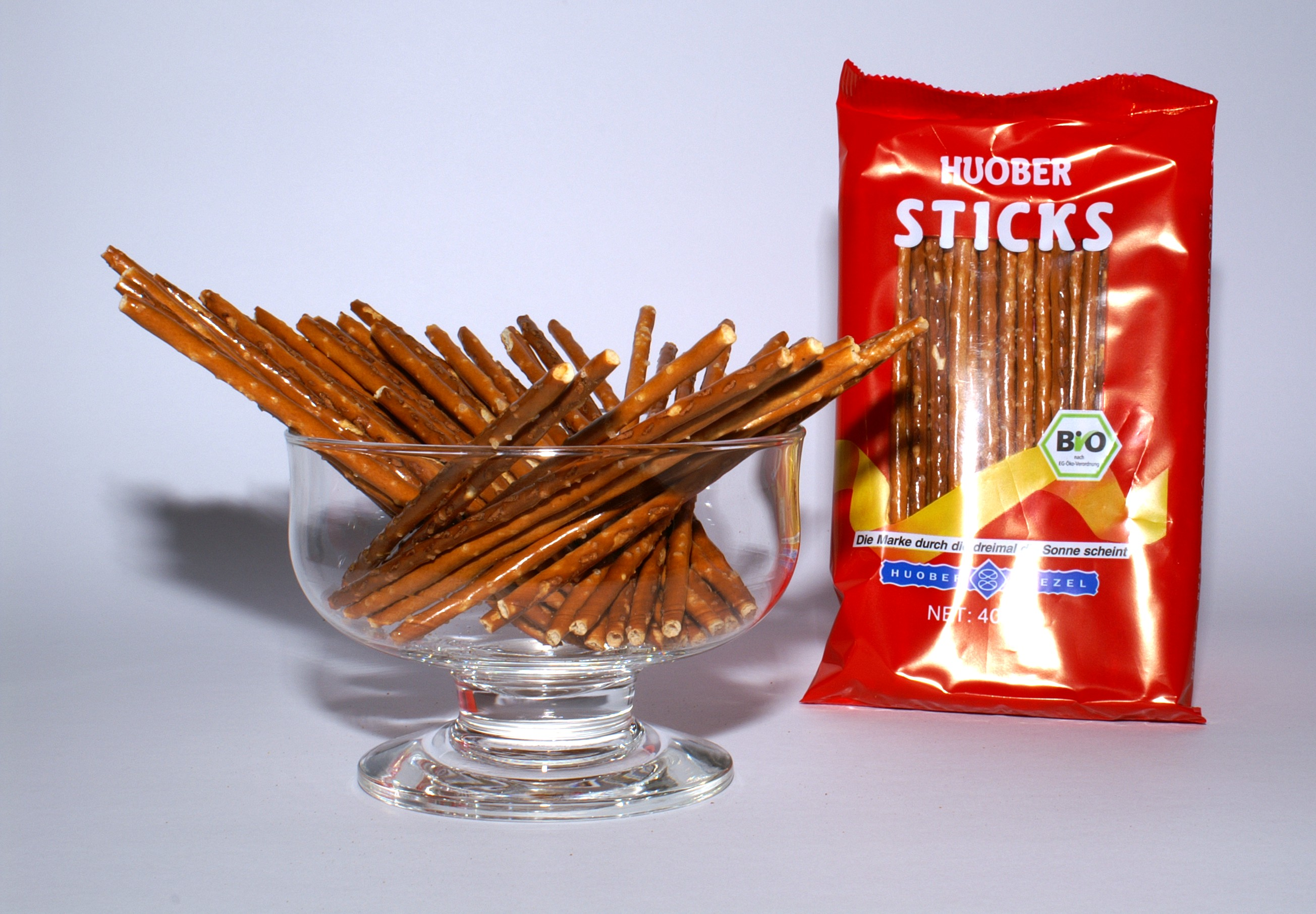
Pretzel sticks

Pretzel sticks are small snacks similar to miniature pretzels. They are 10–15 cm long and about 4 mm thick, made from leavened dough with a lye crust and sprinkled with salt crystals. They are usually produced industrially and served as a snack, often accompanying beer or wine.

The dough for pretzel sticks is primarily made from wheat flour and it also contains yeast, malt, salt, vegetable oil, and water. Their characteristic crust is created by treating the surface with lye (sodium hydroxide).

== History ==
The German company Bahlsen introduced pretzel sticks to the European market under the brand name Salzlettes in 1935. The company’s founder, Klaus Bahlsen, is said to have brought the recipe from one of his trips to the USA.

It is possible that the recipe for pretzel sticks was independently developed in 1949 by the Austrian bakery Bäckerei Zach from Feldbach. The company’s owner, Joseph Zach, was reportedly looking for a way to automate the production of traditional pretzels. Since twisting thin dough rolls into the classic pretzel shape required a great deal of manual labor, he decided to produce them as simple straight sticks instead. Bäckerei Zach was later acquired by United Snacks of Kelly, which began producing the sticks under the brand name Soletti. After major commercial success, this name eventually became the trademark for all of the company’s products.

Over time, pretzel sticks began to be produced by numerous manufacturers worldwide.

== Similar snacks ==
- Pocky
- Breadsticks

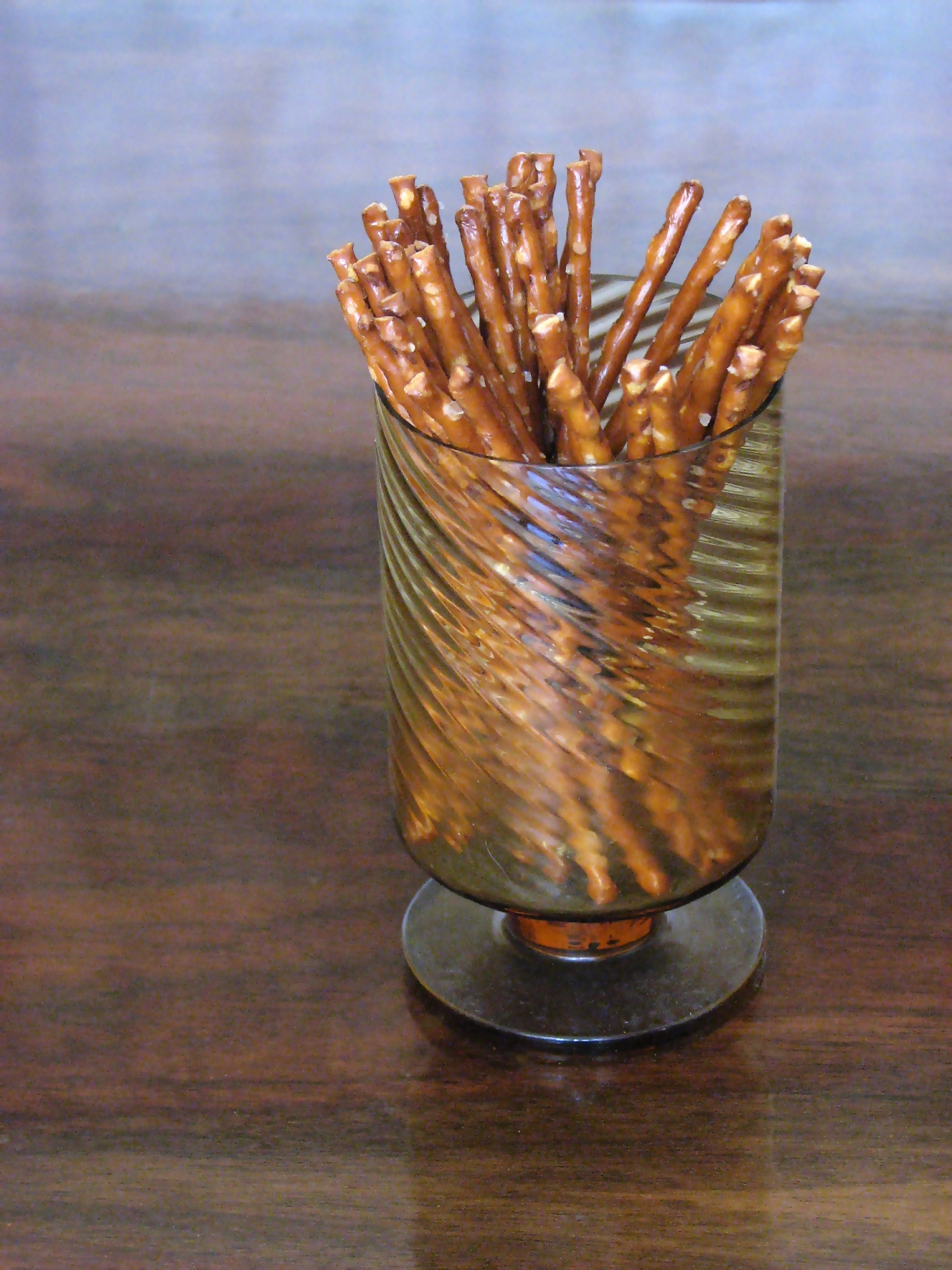
Paluszki
