= Pretz =

Snack food

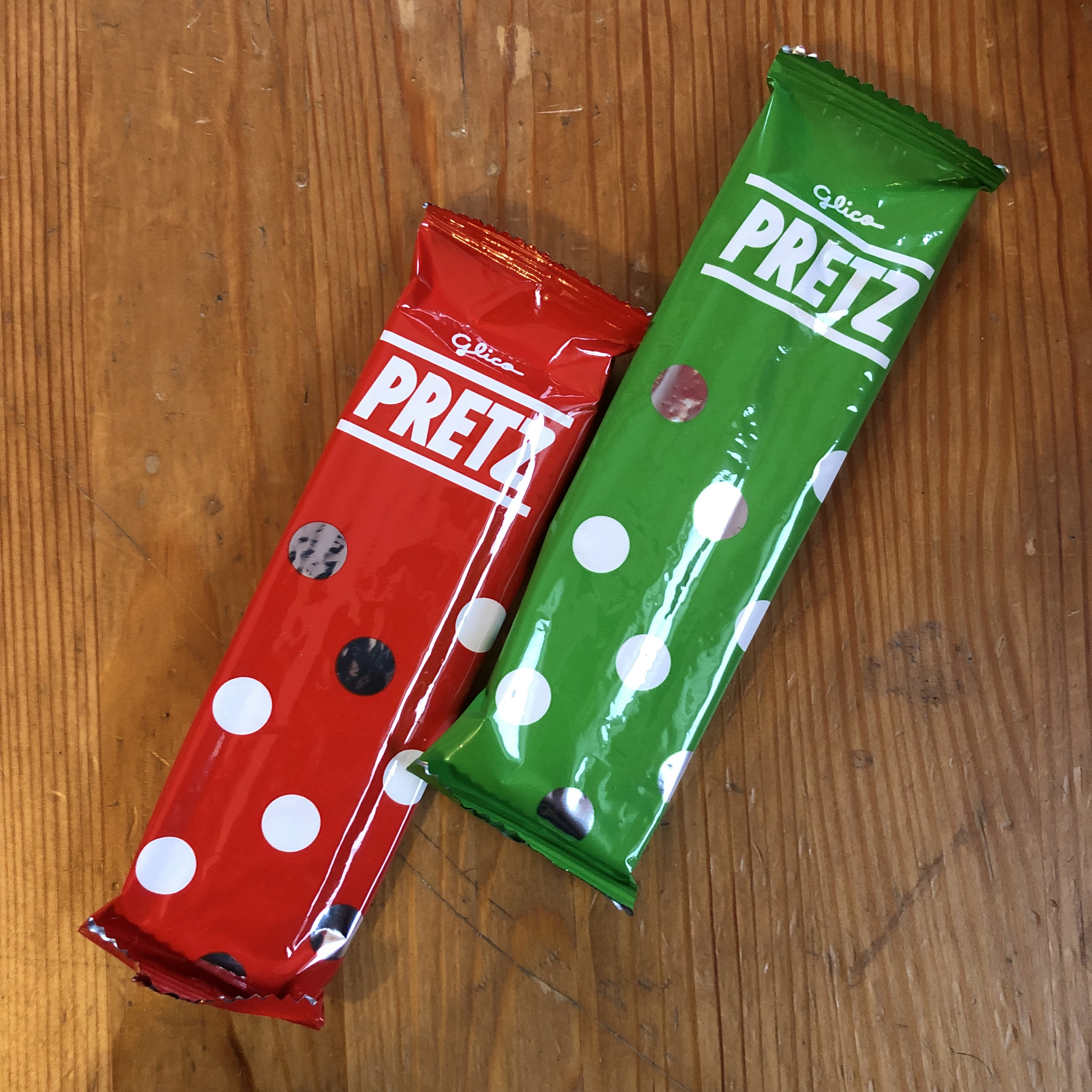
The roast (red) and salad (green) varieties of Pretz

Pretz (プリッツ, Purittsu) is a Japanese snack made by Ezaki Glico. Like Ezaki Glico's other popular snack, Pocky, Pretz is stick-shaped and comes with a texture similar to pretzels. Unlike Pocky, Pretz is dusted with seasonings instead of being enrobed in a flavoured fudge.

Pretz comes in multiple varieties and three sizes: Regular, Kid's, and Giant. Most Pretz come in the Regular size, with some flavours also being offered in Giant size. The Kid's size is a smaller pack of Pretz and is sweeter to appeal to children. Kid's packages also come with a cartoon child on the package. The Double Pretz variety offers two separate flavours on a single Pretz stick (one flavor on each half) and the Meets Wine variety is a cheese-flavored Pretz named to suggest it be paired with wine.

== Flavors ==
Pretz also differs from Pocky, with most of the flavours being savory rather than sweet. The following is a list of existing Pretz flavors:

- Roast Pretz
- Salad Pretz (also known as Original Pretz)
- 11 Types Mixed Salad Pretz
- Tomato Pretz (also available in Giant size)
- Honey Mustard Pretz (a.k.a. American Pretz)
- Corn Pretz
- Kona Coffee Pretz
- Salt Caramel Pretz
- Pizza Pretz
- Edamame Pretz
- Black Pepper Pretz
- Honey and Pomelo Pretz
- Baked Potato Pretz
- Cheese and Potato Pretz
- Butter Pretz
- Bacon Pretz
- Maple Syrup Pretz
- Maple and Butter Pretz
- Egg Pudding Pretz
- Mozzarella Meets Wine Pretz
- Cheddar Meets Wine Pretz
- Fried Pretz
- Melon Pretz
- Spicy Chicken Pretz (a.k.a. Beer Pretz)
- Chocolate Pretz
- Basil Pretz
- Purple Potato Pretz
- Asparagus Pretz
- Cheddar Pretz
- Cheese Pretz
- Scallop Butter Pretz
- Ham & Cheese Pretz
- Hard-Baked Pretz
- Pumpkin Pretz
- Dumpling Pretz
- Green Bean Pretz
- Hatchimitzu Pretz (a.k.a. Honey Pancake Pretz, Kid's size)
- Milk Cocoa Pretz (Kid's size)
- Fruits Pretz
- Blueberry Cheese Double Pretz
- Matcha Vanilla Double Pretz
- Ebi Chili Pretz (a.k.a. Shrimp Chili Sauce Pretz, also available in Giant size)
- Hokkaido Potato Pretz
- French Toast Pretz
- Grilled Curry Pretz
- Bakery Flat Style Pretz
- Takoyaki Pretz
- Mabo Tofu Pretz
- Apple Pretz
- Salt Butter Pretz
- Tom Yum Pretz
- Sweet Corn Pretz
- Seaweed Wasabi Pretz (limited edition)
- Spicy Squid Pretz (limited edition)
- Giant Pretz Edo (limited edition sold in Tokyo, Japan)
- Giant Eel Pretz (limited edition sold in Shizuoka, Japan)
- Soba Pretz (discontinued limited edition sold in Shinshu, Japan)
- Giant Nozawana Pretz (a.k.a. Pickled Green Vegetable Pretz, limited edition sold in Shinshu, Japan)
- Giant Haccho Miso Pretz (limited edition sold in Aichi, Japan)
- Giant Mentaiko Pretz (a.k.a. Hakata Cod Ovum Pretz, limited edition sold in Kyushu, Japan)
- Hawaiian Pineapple Pretz (sold in Hawaii)
- Larb Pretz (sold in Thailand)
- Chilli Cha Cha Pretz (sold in Thailand)
- Coconut Pretz (sold in Guam and Saipan)
- Maple Pretz (sold in Canada, a.k.a. Canada Pretz)
- Abalone Pretz (sold in Hong Kong)
- Shark's Fin Pretz (sold in Hong Kong)
- Hairy Crab Pretz (sold in Shanghai)
- Peking Duck Pretz (sold in Shanghai)
- Sichuan Mala Pretz (sold in Shanghai)
- Green Tea Pretz (sold in Japan)
- Green Pea Pretz (sold in Japan)
- Ume Pretz (sold in Japan)
- Giant Salmon Pretz (sold in Japan)
- Giant Apple Pretz (sold in Japan)
- Giant Okonomiyaki Pretz (sold in Japan)

== Similar products ==
Similar snacks have been around in Germany, Austria and the US since at least the 1950s. Popular products typically spur other companies to make similar items and Pretz is no exception. Current snacks that resemble Pretz include Pringles Stix, Pepero and Nagaraya Sweet-Mini Pretzels.

== Commercial spokespersons ==
- Aya Matsuura (2002–2006)
- Taichi Kokubun (2007–)
- Kavka Shishido (2013–)

== See also ==
- List of Japanese snacks
- Pocky
- Pocky & Pretz Day
