= Glico Morinaga case =

Unsolved Japanese 1984–1985 extortion case

The Glico Morinaga case (グリコ・森永事件, Guriko, Morinaga jiken), also known by its official designation Metropolitan Designated Case 114 (警察庁広域重要指定第114号事件, Keisatsuchō kōiki jūyō shitei dai-hyakujūyongō jiken), was a famous extortion case from 1984 to 1985 in Japan, primarily directed at the Japanese industrial confectioneries Ezaki Glico and Morinaga, and it remains unsolved. The entire case spanned 17 months from the initial kidnapping of the president of Glico to the last known communication from the prime suspect, a person or group known only as "The Monster with 21 Faces".

== Kidnapping ==
At around 21:00 on 18 March 1984, two masked men armed with a pistol and rifle forcefully entered the Nishinomiya home of then-Ezaki Glico president Katsuhisa Ezaki. The home next door belonged to Katsuhisa's 70-year-old mother, Yoshie; the home was located on the same property. The criminals broke into her home first and demanded the key to her son's home.

After entering the home of Katsuhisa Ezaki, the two masked men tied up his wife Mikieko (35 years old) and his eldest daughter Mariko (8) before locking them inside a bathroom. The family's two other children, daughter Yukiko (4) and son Etsuro (11), were asleep in another room and left unharmed. The men then located Ezaki himself, who was bathing, and abducted the still-naked man from his home. Ezaki was taken to a small warehouse in Ibaraki, Osaka.

At around midnight, the kidnappers directed a director of the company to a ransom note in a public phone booth, demanding 1 billion yen (about US$4.5 million at then-current exchange rates) and 100 kilograms of gold bullion. However, three days later, on 21 March, Ezaki managed to escape from the warehouse.

== Glico blackmailing ==
This is a letter sent by The Monster with 21 Faces that was received on 8 April 1984:

To the police fools,
Are you all stupid? What the hell are you doing with all that manpower? If you're professionals then come on, catch us! We'll give you a hint since you're so handicapped: there are none of us among Ezaki's relatives, there are none of us among the Nishinomiya police, there are none of us among the Flood Prevention Corps. The car I bought was gray, and the food I bought was from Daiei. If you want more information, ask us for it in the newspapers. After telling you all this, you should be able to catch us. If you can't, then you're just tax leeches. Shall we kidnap the head of the prefectural police, too?

The extortion attempts against Glico did not end with the escape of Ezaki. On 10 April, vehicles in the parking lot of the Ezaki Glico headquarters' trial production building were set on fire. Then, on 16 April, a plastic container containing hydrochloric acid and a threatening letter to Glico were found in Ibaraki.

On 10 May, Glico began to receive letters from a person or group calling itself "The Monster with 21 Faces" (かい人21面相, kaijin nijūichi mensō), named after the villain of Edogawa Rampo's detective novels and also translated as "The Fiend with the Twenty Faces" or "The Phantom with 20 Faces". The Monster claimed to have laced Glico candies with a potassium cyanide soda. When Glico pulled its products off the shelves at great expense, resulting in a loss of more than $21 million and the laying off of 450 part-time workers, The Monster with 21 Faces threatened to place the tampered products in stores. Following these threats, a man wearing a Yomiuri Giants baseball cap was caught placing Glico chocolate on a store shelf by a security camera. A security camera photo was made public after this incident.

Meanwhile, the Monster with 21 Faces sent letters to the media, taunting police efforts to capture the culprit(s) behind the scare. An excerpt from one such letter, written in hiragana and with an Osaka dialect, reads,

Dear dumb police officers. Don't tell a lie. All crimes begin with a lie as we say in Japan. Don't you know that?

This is a letter sent by The Monster with 21 Faces gang that was received on 23 April 1984. It was sent to both Sankei and Mainichi newspapers as well as the Koshien police station. It read:

"To police fools. You shouldn’t lie. If you lie, you steal. I also sent this to the Koshien police. Why are you lying. Don’t hide things. Why are you complaining? You guys are having such a hard time, so I will give you a hint. I entered the factory from the side staff entrance. The typewriter we used is PAN-writer. The plastic container used was a piece of street garbage.
Monster with 21 faces"

Eventually, the Monster stopped contacting Glico and, on 26 June, issued a letter saying "We Forgive Glico!". However, the Monster then turned its extortion campaign on Morinaga and the food companies Marudai Ham and House Foods Corporation.

== Morinaga blackmailing ==
A threatening letter arrived at the Tokyo home of Morinaga Dairy vice president, Mitsuo Yamada on 1 November 1984. This was one in a long line of extortion and harassment letters sent to various Japanese food companies by a criminal gang calling themselves "Monster with 21 Faces".

To President, you saw our power didn’t you? If you disobey us we will destroy your company. You will get killed. Decide whether you want to give us money or do you want to see your company destroyed? Tell us in the Mainichi Newspaper on either the 5th or 6th of November. Use the missing persons. Use these words in the reply: Jiro, Morinaga, Mother, Police, Bad friend, Money, Meal. As we said before we want two hundred million yen.
Monster with 21 faces"

On November 6, Morinaga responded to the criminals by placing the missing persons advertisement in the Mainichi Newspapers Morning Edition.

"Dear Jiro, Bad friend disappeared. Come back. Warm meal is waiting. Mother Chiyoko."

Two letters were sent to House Foods on 7 November.

== Fox-Eyed Man ==
Police did get close to the suspected mastermind of the "Monster with 21 Faces", however. On 28 June, two days after agreeing to stop harassing Marudai in exchange for 50 million yen (about US$210,000), the "Monster" arranged for a Marudai employee to toss the ransom money onto a local train heading toward Kyoto when a white flag was displayed. An investigator disguised as a Marudai employee and following the drop instructions of the "Monster" spotted a suspicious man observing him when he was riding a train to the drop point. The man was described as a large, well-built man wearing sunglasses, his hair cut short and permed, with "eyes like those of a fox."

When the white flag was not displayed, the undercover policeman and the "Fox-Eyed Man" (キツネ目の男, kitsune-me no otoko) both disembarked from the train at Kyoto station, and while the investigator waited on a bench, the "Fox-Eyed Man" continued to observe him. The investigator later headed back to Osaka, and the "Fox-Eyed Man" boarded another car in the same train. When the investigator then disembarked at Takatsuki station, the "Fox-Eyed Man" boarded a Kyoto-bound train and another undercover investigator tailed him from Kyoto, but the "Fox-Eyed Man" eventually lost him.

== Shiga Prefecture incident ==
Police got a second chance at the "Fox-Eyed Man" on 14 November, when the "Monster" group attempted to rob the House Food Corporation of 100 million yen (about US$410,000) in another secret deal. At a rest stop on the Meishin Expressway, near Otsu, investigators saw the Fox-Eyed Man, wearing a golf cap and dark glasses, but again he evaded capture. The cash delivery van they were tailing continued to head toward the drop point, where they were to drop the money in a can under a white piece of cloth. When the delivery van reached the drop point, the white cloth was there but the can was missing. As a result, the investigative team was ordered to withdraw, believing that the drop was an evaluation by the "Monster" of police response.

However, an hour earlier, a patrol car from the local Shiga Prefecture police had spotted a station wagon with its engine running and its headlights off. The station wagon was also sitting less than 50 meters from a white cloth suspended from a fence. Unaware of the secret ransom drop, the police officer drove up to the station wagon and shone his flashlight on the driver, revealing a thin-cheeked man in his forties, wearing a golf cap over his eyes and, more telling, a wireless receiver with headphones. Surprised by the policeman, the driver sped off, with the police car following in pursuit until the station wagon lost him.

The station wagon was later found abandoned near the Kusatsu Station and had been discovered to have been stolen earlier in Nagaokakyo in Kyoto Prefecture. Inside the abandoned car was a radio transceiver that had been eavesdropping in on radio communications between the police officers of six prefectures, including Osaka, Kyoto, and Kobe, the prefectures of the drop point. Also recovered was a vacuum cleaner, although no evidence could be traced back to the "Monster" group.

Following the blackmail campaign on House Foods, the "Monster" then turned its sights on Fujiya in December 1984. In January 1985, police released the facial composite of the "Fox-Eyed Man" to the public. In August 1985, after continuing harassment by the "Monster with 21 Faces" and the failure to capture the "Fox-Eyed Man", Shiga Prefecture Police Superintendent Yamamoto killed himself by self-immolation.

== Final message and aftermath ==
Five days after the death of Yamamoto, on 12 August, the "Monster with 21 Faces" sent its last message to the media:

Yamamoto of Shiga Prefecture Police died. How stupid of him! We've got no friends or secret hiding place in Shiga. It's Yoshino or Shikata who should have died. What have they been doing for as long as one year and five months? Don't let bad guys like us get away with it. There are many more fools who want to copy us. No-career Yamamoto died like a man. So we decided to give our condolence. We decided to forget about torturing food-making companies. If anyone blackmails any of the food-making companies, it's not us but someone copying us. We are bad guys. That means we've got more to do other than bullying companies. It's fun to lead a bad man's life. Monster with 21 Faces.

Following this message, the Monster with 21 Faces was not heard from again. In March 1994, the statute of limitations ran out on the kidnapping of Ezaki, followed by the lapses of the statute of limitations on the two remaining charges of attempted murder for the poisoned food products in October 1999 and on Saturday, 12 February 2000.

== Prime suspects ==
Following the release of the identikit in January 1985, the Tokyo Metropolitan Police claimed that the culprit was Manabu Miyazaki. Labelled as Mr. "M" or Material Witness "M", Miyazaki was suspected of issuing a 1976 tape declaring support of a local union in a labor dispute with Glico that bore similarities to the numerous declarations of the "Monster with 21 Faces". There had been numerous whistleblowing incidents between 1975 and 1976 that were also attributed to Miyazaki, which highlighted Glico's dumping of starches and other industrial waste into the local river and drainage system. Miyazaki was also suspected to have been involved with the resignation of a union leader over accounting irregularities when Glico Ham and Glico Nutritional Foods merged. In addition, his father was the boss of a local yakuza group and Miyazaki himself bore a striking resemblance to the "Fox-Eyed Man". Speculation had gone on for months that Miyazaki was the "Fox-Eyed Man", until the Tokyo Metropolitan Police checked his alibis and cleared him of any wrongdoing. The resulting notoriety caused Miyazaki to become a social commentator, and he wrote a book about his experiences called Toppamono.

The Tokyo Metropolitan Police also suspect that various yakuza groups had a hand in the Glico-Morinaga case. The end of the blackmail campaign occurred around the time of the Yama-ichi war, the mob war between the Yamaguchi-gumi and the Ichiwa-kai. In addition, Japanese National Public Safety Commission investigated extreme left-wing and right-wing groups as possible suspects.

== In popular culture ==
Kaoru Takamura's 1997 novel Lady Joker (translated in 2021) was inspired by the case.

In 2002, the character of the Laughing Man in Ghost in the Shell: Stand Alone Complex was inspired by the Glico-Morinaga case.

In 2016, Kodansha published a suspense novel Tsumi no Koe (The Voice of Sin) by Takeshi Shiota that used the Glico Morinaga Case as its backdrop. The novel was later adapted into a 2020 movie starring Shun Oguri and Gen Hoshino.

In 2021, BuzzFeed Unsolved covered the case, providing several theories.

== See also ==
- List of kidnappings
- List of people who disappeared mysteriously: post-1970
