= Manabu Miyazaki =

Japanese writer, social critic, and public figure (1945–2022)

- Born: 25 October 1945; Fushimi-ku, Kyoto, Allied-occupied Japan
- Died: 30 March 2022 (aged 76)
- Occupation: Writer
- Known for: Glico Morinaga case suspect

Manabu Miyazaki (宮崎 学, Miyazaki Manabu; 25 October 1945 – 30 March 2022) was a Japanese writer, social critic and public figure. He is the author of several best-selling books in Japan. His autobiography Toppamono sold 600,000 copies and has since been translated into English.

In 1985, Miyazaki was named by the Tokyo police as the prime suspect in the Glico Morinaga case, a 17-month saga of kidnapping and corporate extortion. He was later cleared.

== Translated works ==
- Miyazaki, Manabu (2005). Toppamono: Outlaw. Radical. Suspect. My Life in Japan's Underworld. Tokyo: Kotan Publishing. ISBN 0970171625. OCLC 823709000.

== See also ==
- Shinichiro Kurimoto
