= Glico =

Japanese multinational food company

Ezaki Glico Co., Ltd.

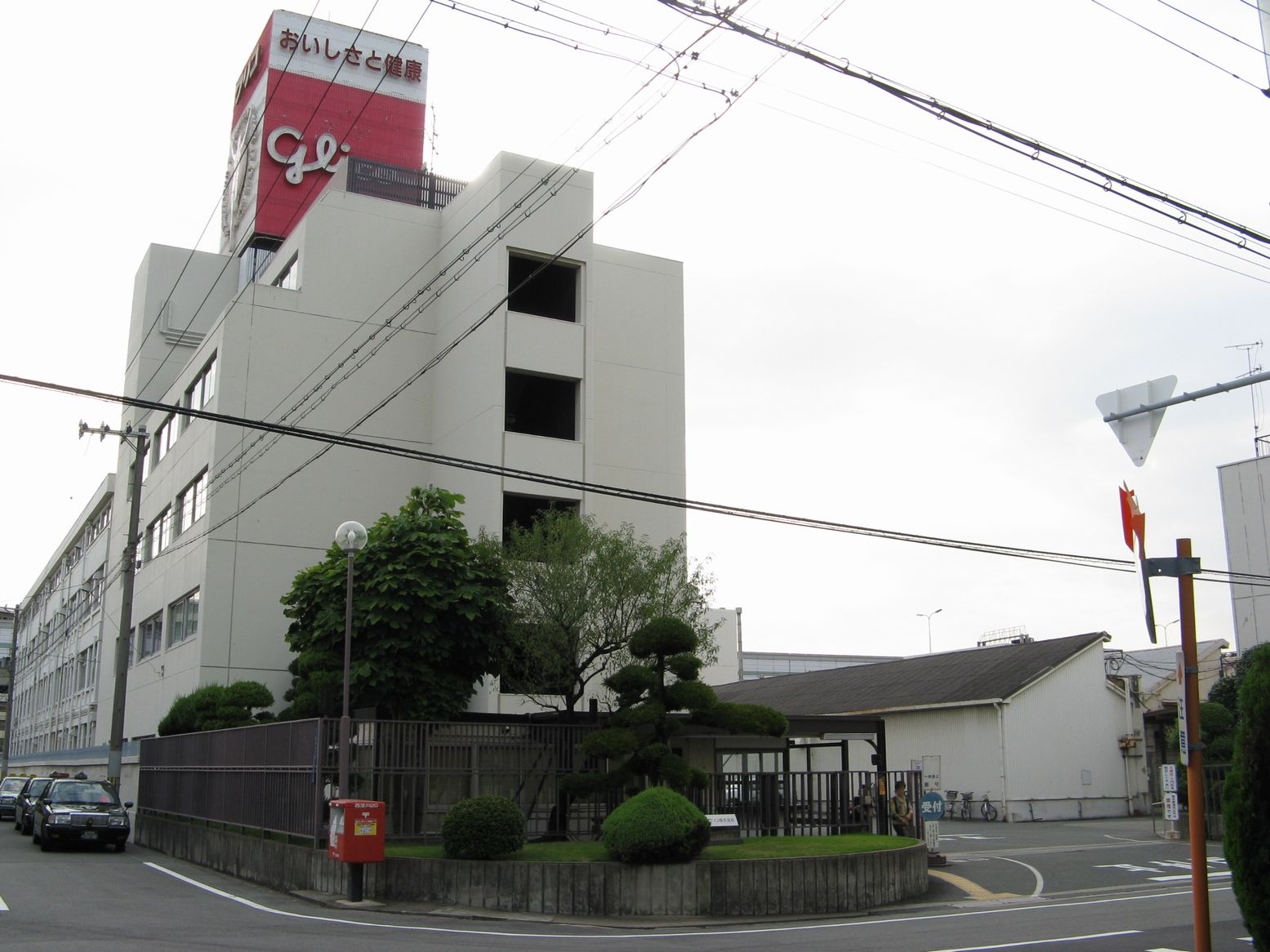
- Headquarters in Nishiyodogawa-ku, Osaka
- Native name: 江崎グリコ株式会社
- Romanized name: Ezaki Guriko Kabushiki-gaisha
- Type: Public
- Traded as: TYO: 2206
- Industry: Food manufacturing
- Founded: Nishi-ku, Osaka, Japan (11 February 1922; 104 years ago)
- Founder: Riichi Ezaki (江崎 利一, Ezaki Riichi)
- Headquarters: Nishiyodogawa-ku, Osaka, Japan
- Key people: Katsuhisa Ezaki (chairman); Etsuro Ezaki (President and CEO)
- Products: Confectioneries, ice cream products, processed food
- Revenue: ▲¥338,437 million US$3,003,531 thousand (112.68 yen/US dollar, March 2016)
- Operating income: ▲¥17,110 million US$151,850 thousand (112.68 yen/US dollar, March 2016)
- Net income: ▼¥14,364 million US$127,478 thousand (112.68 yen/US dollar, March 2016)
- Total assets: ▼¥274,974 million US$2,440,311 thousand (112.68 yen/US dollar, March 2016)
- Total equity: ▲¥179,151 million US$1,589,917 thousand (112.68 yen/US dollar, March 2016)
- Number of employees: 4,961 (consolidated, March 2016)
- Subsidiaries: Glico Nutrition Co., Ltd. Icreo Co., Ltd. and others
- Website: glico.com/global/

Ezaki Glico Co., Ltd. (江崎グリコ株式会社, Ezaki Guriko Kabushiki-gaisha), commonly known as Glico, is a Japanese multinational food processing company headquartered in Nishiyodogawa-ku, Osaka. It does business across 30 countries, in North America, the Asia-Pacific region, and Europe.

== Overview ==
Ezaki Glico's primary business is manufacturing confectionery products such as chocolate, chips, chewing gums, and ice cream, and dairy products. Additionally, Glico manufactures processed foods, such as curry stocks and retort takikomi gohan pouches, and dietary supplement products. Glico's main competitors are Meiji Seika, Lotte, Morinaga, Fujiya and Bourbon Company in the confectionery business and House Foods, Meiji and S&B Foods in the processed food business.

Ezaki Glico is a member of Midori Kai, a group of companies whose main financier was Sanwa Bank (later merged into the Bank of Tokyo-Mitsubishi UFJ).

== History ==
=== In Japan ===
In 1919, Riichi Ezaki created a caramel candy product containing glycogen extracted from oysters. The caramel candy product was named "Glico," a shortening of the word glycogen. The sales copy for this product was "300 Meters in a Single Piece," and a running man was painted on the package. On 11 February 1922, Riichi started selling Glico products at the Mitsukoshi Osaka branch.

Later, in 1922, Riichi established a company, Ezaki Glico Co., Ltd. Its Osaka and Tokyo factories were destroyed during World War II, and they were reopened in 1951. Popular products like Pretz and Pocky were introduced in 1963 and 1966, respectively.

In 1984, the Glico Morinaga case, a series of criminal incidents targeting Japanese major food manufacturers, occurred. Ezaki Glico and other victims were targeted by a group known as "The Monster with 21 Faces." The group claimed that $21 million ($2.26 billion yen) worth of sweets were laced with potassium cyanide soda, while Katsuhisa Ezaki(jp), president and CEO, was kidnapped but escaped by himself. Ezaki Glico was blackmailed and its office was burned by the criminals.

=== Overseas ===
Ezaki Glico has been expanding its business overseas. At first, in 1932, Ezaki Glico established its factory in Dalian, China. In 1970, Ezaki Glico started its business in Thailand, establishing Thai Glico Co., Ltd. Later, in 1982, Generale Biscuit Glico France S.A. was established and started sales of Mikado (Pocky) in France. Ezaki Glico established Ezaki Glico USA Co., Ltd. in 2003. Additionally, it established PT Glico Wings (a joint venture with Wings Corp) in 2013 and PT Glico Indonesia in 2014, both of which are Indonesian companies.

== Products ==
Ezaki Glico manufactures a wide variety of products. Major products are listed here.

=== Confections ===
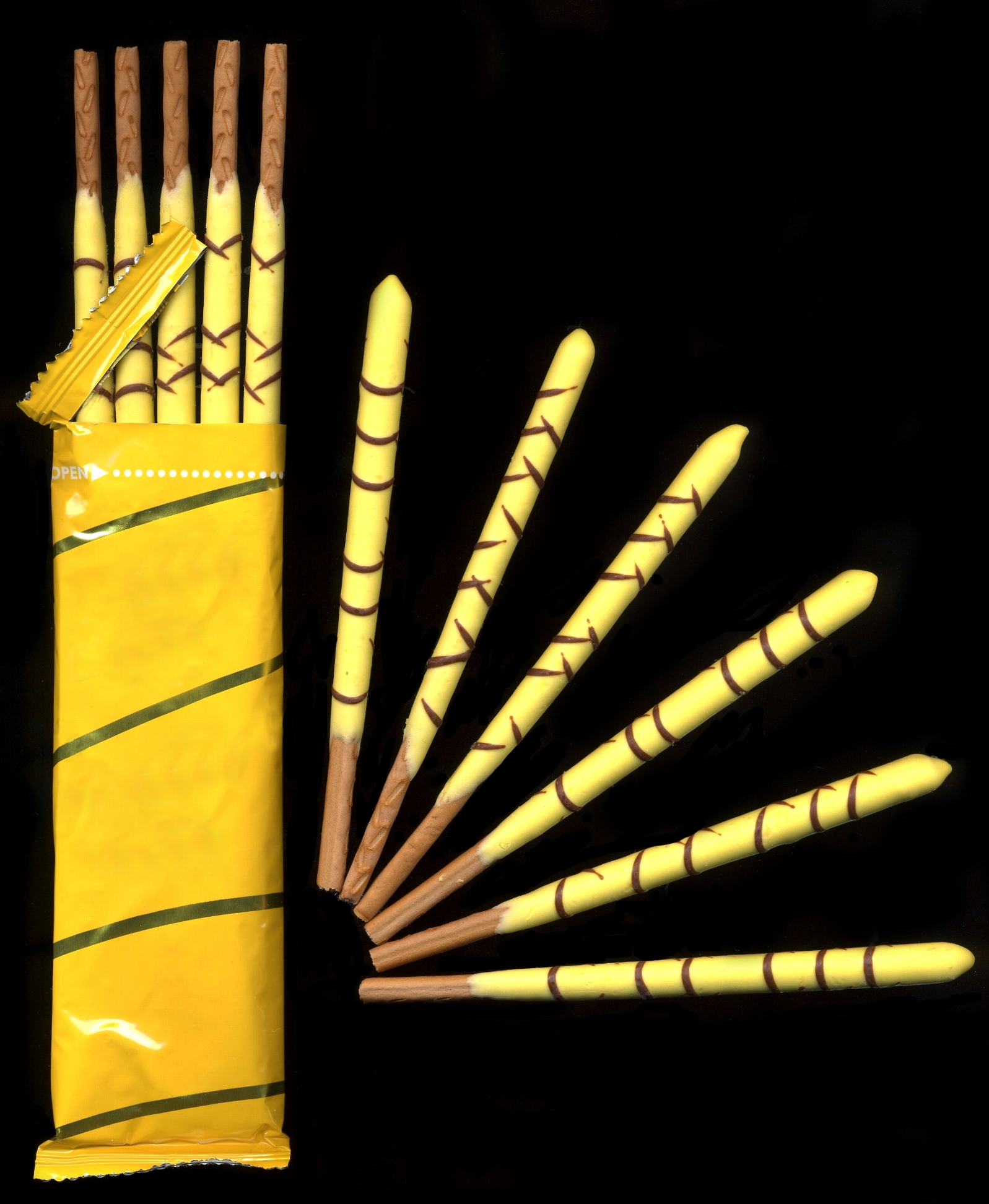
Pocky custard fondue

- TCHO, a Berkeley, California–based artisanal chocolate manufacturer of various chocolate bars.
- Glico, caramel product. In addition to the standard flavor, there are caramel flavor and crushed almond flavor products.
- Pocky, chocolate-coated pretzel sticks, which come in many other flavors. The total sales from 1966 exceeds 10 billion packages. In Europe, this product is sold with the "Mikado" brand in partnership with Mondelez International.
- Pretz, pretzel sticks, which come in many other flavors.
- Almond Chocolate, almonds coated with chocolate.
- Caplico, frosting-dipped waffle biscuits in the shape of ice cream cones that come in either chocolate or strawberry flavor.
- Bisco, wheat germ crackers with yogurt cream using special yeast.
- BREO, an oral care candy that was developed for cleaning the tongue and breath.

=== Dairy products ===
- Pucchin Pudding, the world's best-selling pudding product. Its characteristic is a special package with which consumers can efficiently move the contents on a plate.

=== Ice cream products ===
- Giant Cone, ice cream in a large cone with crisp chocolate and nut toppings.
- Panapp, vanilla ice cream in a handy long cup with fruit sauce fillings in the centre.
- Papico, sherbet that comes in tubes.
- Ice no Mi (アイスの実), bite-sized round ice candies. Ezaki Glico promoted this product with an extremely realistic CG character, Aimi Eguchi, who was created using facial features from members of the pop girl group, AKB48.
- Calorie Control Ice Cream series, which uses lower-calorie sweetening agents maltitol and sucralose in place of sugar and starch syrup often used in ice cream. Tofu is also used to replace dairy products to lower the amount of calories.
- Seventeen Ice, a brand of ice cream coming in over 20 different flavors, which is only available in vending machines.

=== Processed foods ===
- Ni-dan Juku Curry, cubed-type Japanese-style curry stock.
- Donburi-tei, instant donburi retort pouch product.
- Cream stew roux.

=== Baby formula ===
- ICREO Balance Milk, a powdered baby formula manufactured by Icreo Co., Ltd.

== Advertisement ==
Ezaki Glico's large LED sign located above Dōtonbori in Osaka has been a landmark of the city since its initial installation in 1935. It bears the Glico running man on a blue race track. The giant sign has been revised on several occasions in order to celebrate events such as the World Cup and to bolster team spirit for Osaka's baseball team, the Hanshin Tigers. The sign has long been a popular photo stop for both tourists and locals.

Ezaki Glico was the main sponsor of the anime series Tetsujin 28 (1963–1966, the original Japanese version of Gigantor).

British claymation characters Wallace and Gromit have been used to advertise Pucchin Pudding.

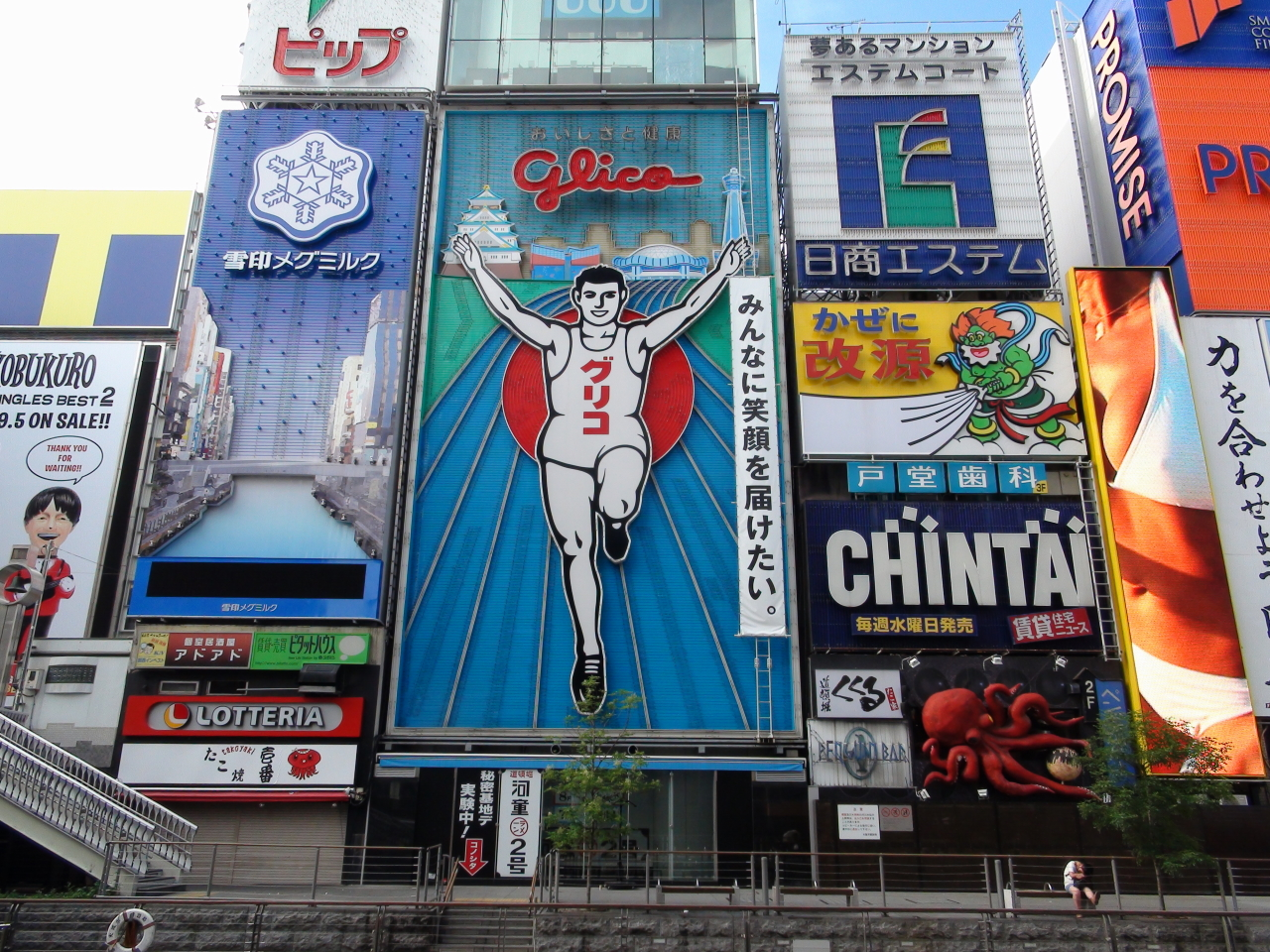
Glico Man advertisement in Dōtonbori (Osaka).

== See also ==
- Aimi Eguchi, CGI pop idol created by Glico
- Dōtonbori
- Fortunato Catalon
- Glico Morinaga case
- Panasonic, Glico's one-time shareholder
- Pocky & Pretz Day, November 11 each year
