= Pinke =

Pinke may refer to:

- Pinke (color), a shade of yellow
- Robert Pinke (1573-1647), English clergyman

== See also ==
- Pink (disambiguation)
- Pinki (disambiguation)
- Pinkie (disambiguation)
- Pinky (disambiguation)
