= Pink (disambiguation) =

Pink is a pale red color.

Pink, Pinks, or Pink's may also refer to:

== Arts, entertainment and media ==
=== Fictional characters ===
- Pink, the protagonist of Pink Floyd album The Wall
- Pink, a fictional character from the web series Dick Figures
- Pink, character in the video game Deltarune

=== Film ===
- Pink (2011 film), a 2011 Korean film
- Pink (2016 film), a 2016 Indian film
- Pink, a film at the 2007 Toronto International Film Festival
- Pink film, a term for Japanese films that include nudity or deal with sexual content
- A character in Pink Floyd – The Wall
- Lead character nickname in 1993 film Dazed and Confused

=== Gaming ===
- Post and pair, a card game sometimes known as "pink"

=== Literature ===
- Pink (magazine), LGBT-themed magazine
- Pink (1982 manga), a 1982 one-shot manga by Akira Toriyama
- Pink (1989 manga), by Kyoko Okazaki
- Pink (Van Sant novel), a 1997 novel by Gus Van Sant
- Pink (Wilkinson novel), a 2009 novel by Lili Wilkinson
- "The Pink" or "The Carnation", a German fairy tale collected by the Brothers Grimm

=== Music ===
==== Albums ====
- Pink (Boris album), 2005
- Pink (Four Tet album), 2012
- Pink (Mindless Self Indulgence album), 2015
- Pink, a 2017 album by Chai
- Pink, a 2023 album by Robin Schulz

==== Musicians ====
- Pink (singer) (born 1979), stage name of musician Alecia Moore (also stylized "P!nk")
- Apink, Korean girl band

==== Songs ====
- "Pink" (Aerosmith song), by Aerosmith
- "Pink" (Lizzo song)
- "Pynk", by Janelle Monáe featuring Grimes
- "Pink", by Maretu (also known as Gokuaku-P) featuring Japanese Vocaloid Hatsune Miku

=== Television ===
- Pinks (TV series), a racing show
- Pink TV (France), a gay-oriented channel
- Pink TV (US), a pornography channel
- RTV Pink, a Serbian network
- "Colours – Pink", an episode of Teletubbies

== Organizations, businesses and brands ==
- Airpink, airline call sign: AIR PINK
- Microsoft Kin, a mobile phone line (originally codenamed Project Pink)
- Pink's Hot Dogs, a restaurant
- Pink (Victoria's Secret), product line by Victoria's Secret
- Taligent, an Apple/IBM partner corporation with software codenamed Pink
- Thomas Pink, a chain of clothing stores
- PINK, a brand of pink-colored fiberglass insulation made by Owens Corning
- Pink, open stock trading market designation of the OTC Markets Group

== People ==
- Pink (surname), several people
- Pink (singer) (born 1979), American singer
- Lady Pink (born 1964), Ecuadorian-American artist
- Inbar Haiman, an artist who used the tag name PINK

== Places ==
- Pink, Mazandaran Province, Iran
- Pink, Kentucky, unincorporated community
- Pink, Mississippi, ghost town
- Pink, Oklahoma, town
- Pink Bay, a bay in South Australia
- Pink Creek, a stream in Georgia

== Other uses ==
- Pink (ship), a type of watercraft
- PINK!, the youth wing of the Dutch political party Party for the Animals
- Pink/pinks, a number of flowers in the genus Dianthus
- Pink, for plants, most commonly applied to Dianthus plumarius
- Mountbatten pink, a camouflage colour applied to British ships during World War Two
- Acrodynia, also known as "Pink's Disease"
- Pinks, the name for red coats traditionally worn in fox hunting
- Pinks and greens, a US Army's officer winter service uniform from World War II
- U-47700, a synthetic opioid drug commonly called "pink"
- Crazy Pink, boosters of Akita Northern Happinets

== See also ==
- Little Pink, young jingoistic Chinese nationalists on the internet
- Pinko, pejorative political term
- The Pink Panther (disambiguation)
- Pink slip (disambiguation)
- Pinking (disambiguation)
- Pinky (disambiguation)
- Pinque (disambiguation)
- PINQ (C# API), see Implementations of differentially private analyses
