= Pinky =

Pinky may refer to:

- Pinky finger, the smallest finger on the human hand

== People ==
- Pinky Amador (born 1966), Filipina actress
- Pinky Lee (1907–1993), television personality born Pincus Leff, host of The Pinky Lee Show
- Pinky Maidasani, first female folk rapper and Indian playback singer
- Pinky Webb (born 1970), Filipina broadcast journalist

=== Stage name/nickname ===
- Pinky (nickname), a list
- Stage name of Zhou Jieqiong, Chinese K-pop singer
- "La Pinky", stage name of Dominican Republic children's entertainer Nuryn Sanlley

== Arts and entertainment ==
=== Fictional characters ===
- Pinky, played by Harpo Marx in the movies Horse Feathers and Duck Soup
- Pinky, a pig in the 1950s British television program Pinky and Perky
- Pinky, a pink koala in the 1984 Japanese anime Noozles
- Pinky, a panther in the 1980s animated television series Pink Panther and Sons
- Pinky, a lab mouse in the 1990s animated television series Pinky and the Brain and Animaniacs
- Pinky, a cat in the online animated television series The Pinky Show
- Pinky, the main character in the 2000s American animated children's television series Pinky Dinky Doo
- Pinky, a title character and female kung fu hero in the 2000s television series Kung Faux
- Lady Pinky, an alien from the Japanese animated television series The Brave Fighter of Legend Da-Garn
- Pinky, a chihuahua secret agent in 2000s animated television series Phineas and Ferb; see List of characters in Phineas and Ferb
- Pinky, a character in the television series Outsourced
- Pinky the Whiz Kid, a comic book character
- Pinky (Pac-Man), the pink ghost in the video game series Pac-Man and Ms. Pac-Man
- Pinky, a flying pig in the British animated children's television series Magic Adventures of Mumfie
- the title character of Pinky the Cat, an early 1990s viral video
- Pinky, a character in the 1997 Indian film Daud
- Pinky, a character in the 2012 Indian film Pinky Moge Wali
- Pinky Demon, a monster antagonist in the Doom (video game) series
- Pinky Malinky, the titular character from the Netflix animated series
- Pinky Rose, Sissy Spacek's character in the 1977 film 3 Women
- Pinky Tuscadero, a recurring character in the television series Happy Days

=== Film and television ===
- Pinky (film), a 1949 American film directed by Elia Kazan
- "Pinky", an episode of My Name Is Earl

=== Other arts and entertainment ===
- Pinky (comics), an Italian comic series

== Other uses ==
- Pinky (magazine), a Japanese fashion magazine
- Pinky (candy), a confection marketed by Japanese company Frente
- Pinky (dolphin), an albino dolphin spotted in Calcasieu Lake, Louisiana
- pinky, a lightweight version of the UNIX finger protocol
- Pinky, a street name of the synthetic opioid U-47700

== See also ==
- Pinky toe, a colloquial term for the outermost human toe
- Pinky:St, or Pinky Street, collectible figures made by Japanese company Vance
- Pink (disambiguation)
- Pinkie (disambiguation)
