= Pinkie =

Pinkie may refer to:

== Biology ==
- Pinky finger or little finger
- Pinkie, a baby mouse used as a food for exotic pets
- Bilby or pinkie, an animal in Southern Australia
- Pinkie, a rosemary cultivar

== People ==
- Pinkie (given name)
- Pinkie Barnes (1915–2012), English international table tennis champion
- Stuart 'Pinkie' Bates, Hammond organ player with the band The Divine Comedy
- Bob Davie (ice hockey) (1912–1990), Canadian National Hockey League defenceman
- Pinkie Gordon Lane (1923–2008), African-American poet, editor and teacher
- Lawrence Stark (1920–2004), Second World War Royal Air Force fighter ace
- Pinkie C. Wilkerson (1948–2000), African American member of the Louisiana House of Representatives; see Louisiana Center for Women in Government and Business Hall of Fame

== Fictional characters ==
- Pinkie Brown, a character in Graham Greene's novel Brighton Rock
- Pinkie Leroy, a character in the 1950 Noël Coward musical Ace of Clubs
- Pinkie Wingate, Judy Garland’s character in the 1938 film Listen, Darling
- Pinkie Pie, a character from My Little Pony

== Other uses ==
- Pinkie (painting), a 1794 portrait by Thomas Lawrence
- Pinkie House, a historic Scottish mansion
- Pinkie Road, a proposed highway in Saskatchewan, Canada
- Battle of Pinkie, a battle between Scotland and England in 1547.
- Pinkie (video game), a 1994 platform game

== See also ==
- Pinky (disambiguation)
