= When Animals Attack! =

American television series

When Animals Attack! is a series of television specials aired by Fox in the United States during the mid- to late-1990s. The specials compiled graphic clips of various animals attacking humans.

The series was credited to the network's "alternate programming" head Mike Darnell. Robert Urich hosted When Animals Attack 1, 2, and 3, and Louis Gossett Jr. hosted When Animals Attack 4.

== See also ==
- Pinky the Cat
- Binky (polar bear)
- Zoo (American TV series)
