= Pinkie (given name) =

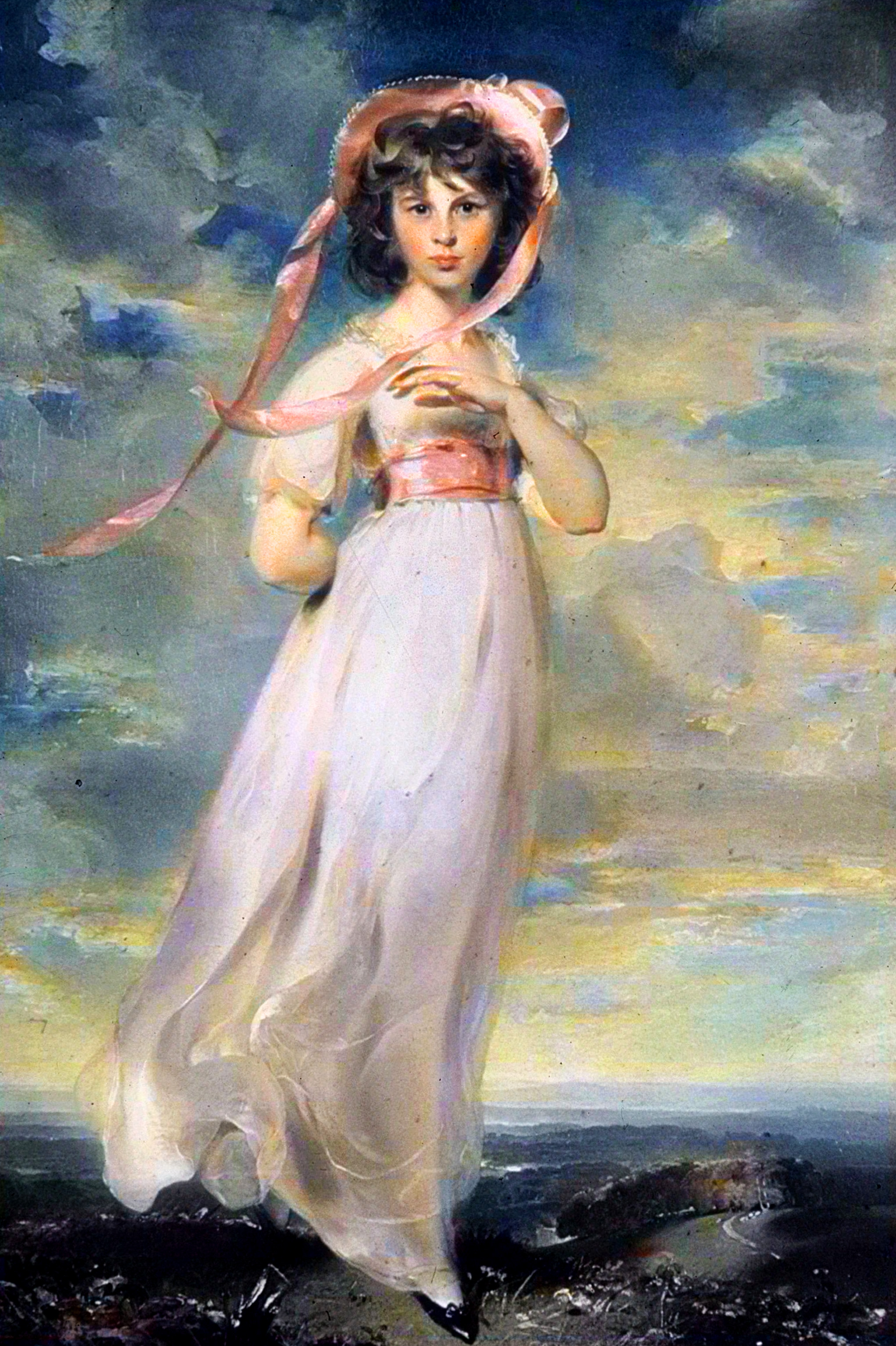
- Sarah "Pinkie" Barrett Moulton (1783–1795), painted by Thomas Lawrence in 1794.
- Gender: Unisex
- Language: English

Origin
- Meaning: little pink one

Pinkie or Pinky is an English given name or hypocorism taken from a diminutive term for the color pink. It is also occasionally a diminutive for names such as Patricia. Variants include Pink, Pinka, Pinke, Pinkee, Pinkey, and Pinki. The name was among the 1,000 most popular names for girls born in the United States at different times between 1880 and 1935.

== Women with the given name ==
- Pinkie Gordon Lane (1923–2008), American poet, editor, and teacher of African-American heritage
- Pinkie Maclure (born 1966), Scottish stained glass artist and musician
- Pinkie C. Wilkerson (194–-2000), American politician of African-American heritage

== Women with the nickname ==
- Lavender "Pinkie" Barnes (1915–2012), English international table tennis champion
- Sarah "Pinkie" Barrett Moulton (1783–1795), Jamaican girl who was the subject of the famous painting Pinkie by Thomas Lawrence

== Pseudonym ==
- Sarah "Pinkie" Bennett, pseudonym of American writer, artist, and illustrator Lisa Brown (born 1972)

== Men with the nickname ==
- Stuart "Pinkie" Bates, Hammond organ player with the Northern Ireland band The Divine Comedy
- Paul "Pinkie" Georgeacopoulos (1905–1993), American professional wrestling promoter, boxer and businessman
