= Cornard Wood, near Sudbury, Suffolk =

1748 painting by Thomas Gainsborough

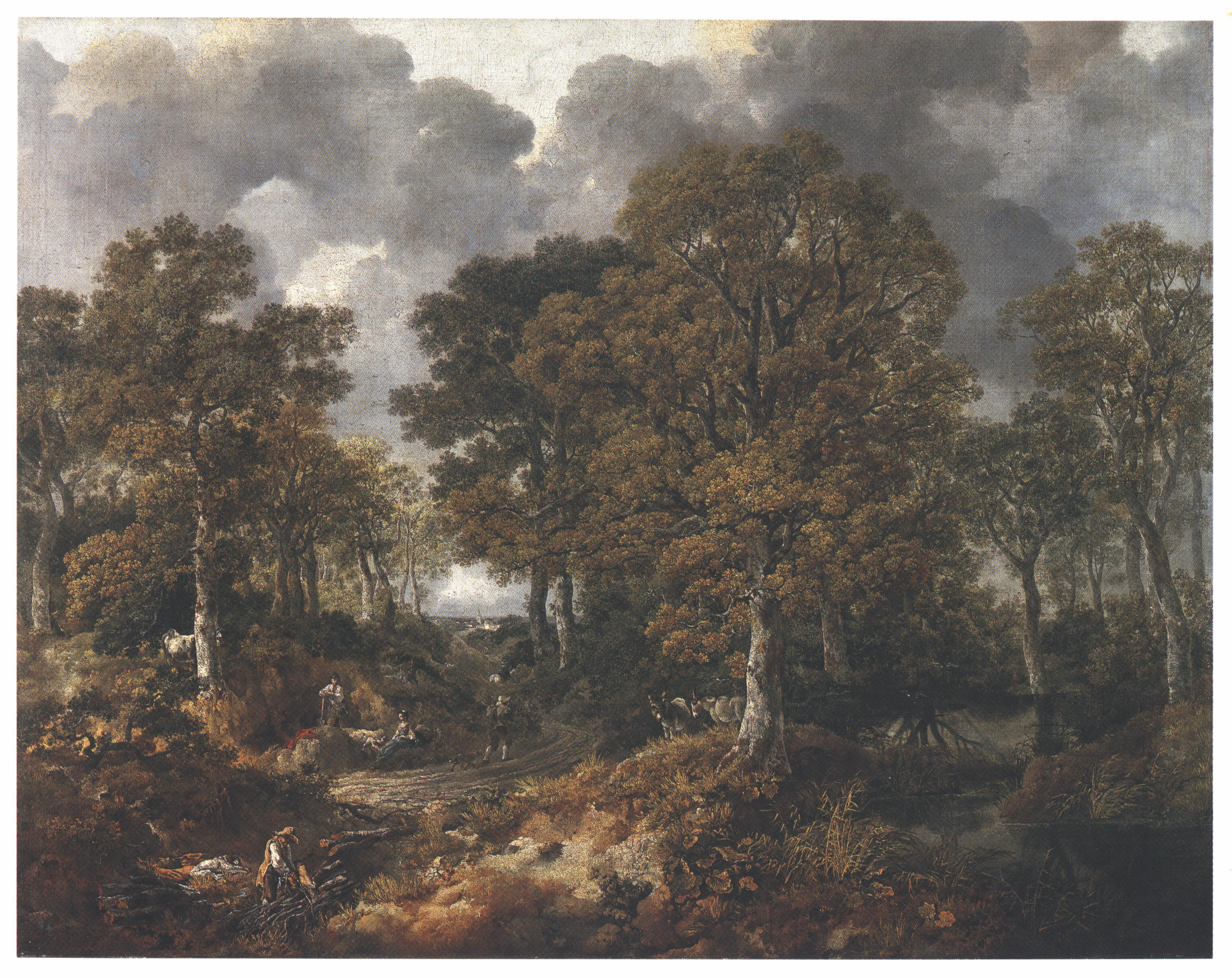
- Artist: Thomas Gainsborough
- Year: 1748
- Medium: Oil on canvas
- Dimensions: 122 cm × 155 cm (48 in × 61 in)
- Location: National Gallery, London

Cornard Wood, near Sudbury, Suffolk is an oil on canvas landscape painting by English artist Thomas Gainsborough, from 1748. It is held in the National Gallery, in London, which bought it in 1875.

== Description ==
Two-thirds of the painting depict a group of deciduous trees displaying autumnal colors, and this mass of trees is surmounted by cloud-laden skies. A path runs through the wooded area, where four peasants and some animals (a cow and two mules) can be seen. In the middle of the clearing, at the end of the horizon line, is depicted a village. The church steeple in the background has been identified as that of St. Mary's Church in the village of Great Henny, located in Great Cornard, Suffolk, though it is unproven.

The title has been in use since 1828 and comes from a publication related to the first posthumous sale of Gainsborough's works, that took place in London, in 1789-1790, organized by his nephew Gainsborough Dupont.
