= Pinking =

Pinking may refer to:

- Engine knocking, the noise indicative of improper combustion in internal combustion engines
- Pinking shears
- An alternative name for pargeting

== See also ==
- Pinky (disambiguation)
