= Pinky (nickname) =

Pinky is the nickname of:

- Pinky Agnew (born 1955), New Zealand actress, author and social commentator
- Pinky Anand, Indian lawyer
- Pinky Beecroft, Australian singer, songwriter and screenwriter
- Benazir Bhutto (1953–2007), twice Prime Minister of Pakistan
- Sheila Levrant de Bretteville (born 1940), American graphic designer, artist and educator
- Withers A. Burress (1894–1977), US Army lieutenant general
- Cuthbert Burnup (1875–1960), English amateur cricketer and footballer
- Savika Chaiyadej (born 1986), Thai actress
- Keith Christensen (born 1947), American retired football player
- Louis Clarke (1901–77), American sprinter and Olympic relay champion
- Sally Maria Diggs (c. 1851–?), American slave girl bought and freed by Henry Ward Beecher
- Pinky Hargrave (1896–1942), American Major League Baseball player
- J. C. Harrington (1901–1998), American archaeologist
- Pinky Higgins (1909–1969), American Major League Baseball player, manager, executive and scout
- Pinky Lilani (born 1954), Indian writer
- Noella Leduc (born 1933), pitcher and outfielder in the All-American Girls Professional Baseball League (1951–1954)
- Chris Lindsay (1878–1941), American Major League Baseball player
- Mary Pinkney Hardy MacArthur, wife of Arthur MacArthur Jr. and mother of Douglas MacArthur
- Pinky May (1911–2000), American Major League Baseball player
- Pinky Mitchell (1899–1976), American boxer and National Boxing Association light welterweight champion
- George Nelson (astronaut) (born 1950), American astronomer and retired NASA astronaut
- Neil Patterson (athlete) (1885–1948), American high jumper
- Jan Peerce (1904–1984), American operatic tenor
- Pauline Pirok (born 1926), member of the All-American Girls Professional Baseball League (1943–1948)
- Pinky Pittenger (1899–1977), American Major League Baseball player
- Donn F. Porter (1931–1952), US Army sergeant posthumously awarded the Medal of Honor
- Pinky Maidasani, Indian folk rapper and playback singer
- Pinky Sarkar, Indian actress
- Lidia Elsa Satragno (1935–2022), Argentine actress and news anchor
- Pinky Silverberg (1904–1964), American boxer, briefly National Boxing Association flyweight champion
- Virginia Pinky Smith, American pioneering female jockey
- Meredith P. Snyder (1858–1937), American businessman and three-time mayor of Los Angeles
- Pinky Swander (1880–1944), American Major League Baseball player
- Myron "Pinky" Thompson (1924–2001), social worker and community leader in Hawaiʻi
- Pinky Tomlin (1907–1987), singer, songwriter and bandleader of the 1930s and 1940s
- Pinky Webb (born 1970), Filipino television news anchor
- Pinky Whitney (1905–1987), American Major League Baseball player
- Pinky Woods (1920–1982), American Major League Baseball pitcher

== See also ==
- Pinkie (disambiguation)
- Pinkie (given name)
