= Pinque =

Pinque may refer to:

- Pinque, American rapper and singer. He got popular by posting his songs on SoundCloud
- Blechnum penna-marina, the alpine water fern
- Pink (ship) (also pinco, pincke), the pinque, a narrow-sterned sailing ship
- Pinque, a chain of women's clothing stores owned by Beckie Hughes, 2008 Miss Colorado USA
- Pinque, the scarlet fox-hunting coat, see Pink
- Pinque Lake, Temagami, Ontario, Canada; a lake in White Bear Forest
- Erminio Pinque, founder of Big Nazo

== See also ==
- Pink (disambiguation)
- PINQ (C# API), see Implementations of differentially private analyses
