= Pink sheet =

Pink sheet or Pink Sheets may refer to:

- "Pink sheet trading" (or "over-the-counter trading") directly between two parties, rather than through a broker
- Pink Sheets LLC, a private company that offers real-time quotation service for the stocks listed in the over-the-counter market
- Flyers handed out in the 1950 California Senate election campaign
- Results from individual polling stations in the 2012 Ghanaian general election

== See also ==
- Pink slip (disambiguation)
