= Karamucho =

Japanese brand of potato snacks

Kara Mucho (Karamucho)
- Japanese snack food
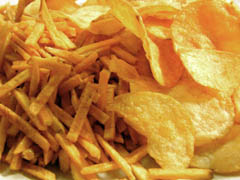
- Japanese name: カラムーチョ
- Maker: Koikeya
- Ingredients: potato, vegetable oil, red pepper powder, salt, sugar, MSG, spice
- Flavours: Kara Mucho Sticks, Hot chili; Kara Mucho Chips, Hot chili; Kara Mucho Sticks, Golden chili; Kara Mucho Chips, Golden chili; Gekikara Kara Mucho Sticks, Intense spicy hot chili; Gekikara Kara Mucho Chips, Intense spicy hot chili; Suppai Mucho, Plum

Karamucho is a Japanese snack food, which consists of potato sticks or potato chips, and is spicy by Japanese standards. Each 57-gram (2-ounce) packet provides 1,260 kilojoules (301 kilocalories) of food energy. It is made by Koikeya.

The name is a play on the Japanese word Karai (辛い, spicy); and the Spanish word "Mucho", meaning "a lot" and has been present on the market since 1984.
