= The Blue Boy =

Painting by Thomas Gainsborough

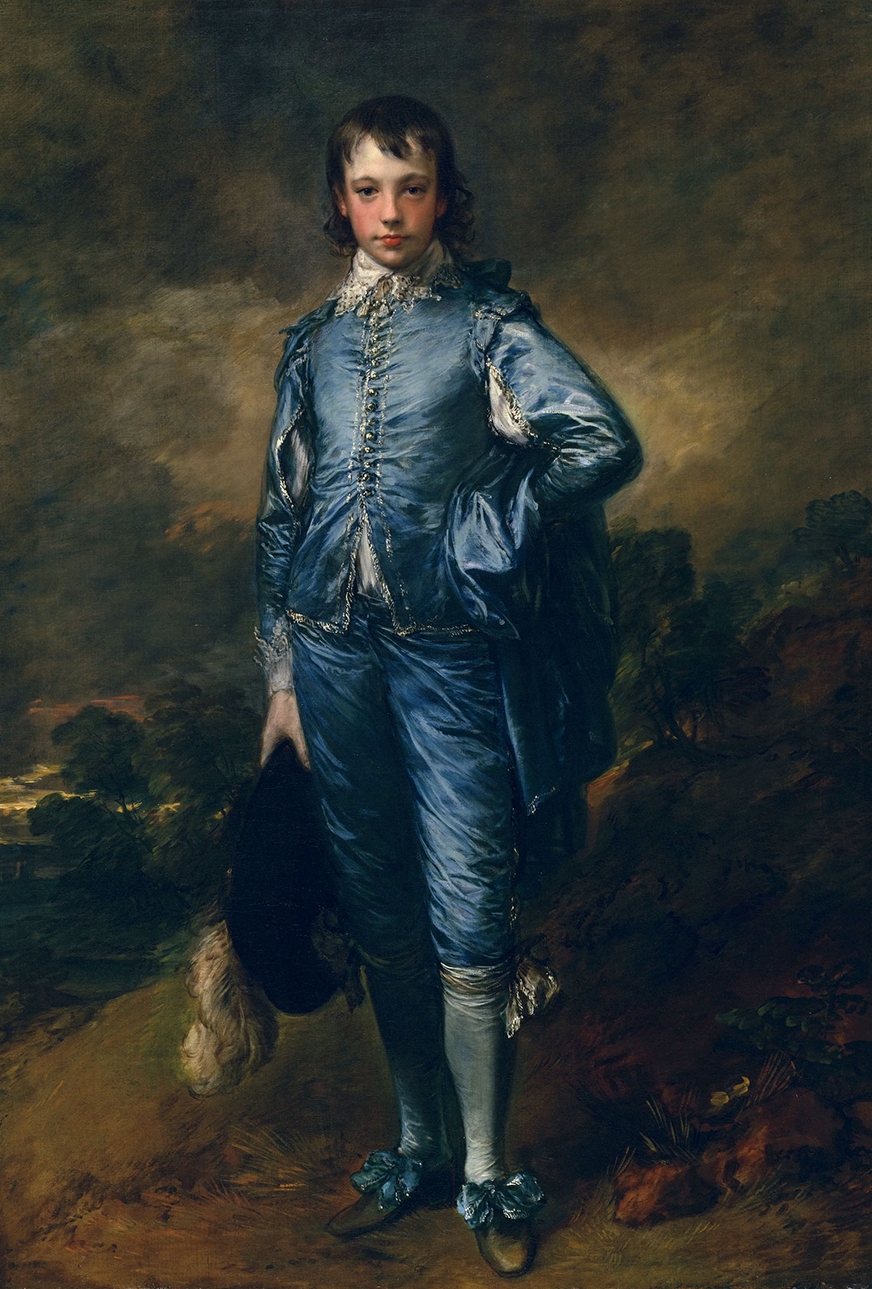
- Artist: Thomas Gainsborough
- Year: c. 1770
- Medium: oil on canvas
- Dimensions: 177.8 cm × 112.1 cm (70.0 in × 44.1 in)
- Location: Henry E. Huntington Art Gallery, San Marino, California

The Blue Boy is a full-length oil on canvas portrait in oil by English artist Thomas Gainsborough, from c. 1770. It is owned by The Huntington in San Marino, California. Although both it and its creator are well known, the subject's identity is disputed.

== History ==
One of Gainsborough's best-known works, The Blue Boy was long thought to be a portrait of Jonathan Buttall (1752–1805), the son of a wealthy hardware merchant, because of his early ownership of the painting. This identification has never been proven, and as Susan Sloman argued in 2013, the likely sitter is Gainsborough's nephew, Gainsborough Dupont (1754–1797). It is a historical costume study as well as a portrait; the youth appears in clothing from the 17th century as the artist's homage to Anthony van Dyck and is very similar to van Dyck's portraits of young boys, especially his double portrait of brothers George Villiers, 2nd Duke of Buckingham, and Lord Francis Villiers.

Gainsborough had already drawn something on the canvas before beginning The Blue Boy, which he painted over. The painting is about life-size, measuring 48 inches (1,200 mm) wide by 70 inches (1,800 mm) tall.

In 1821, John Young (1755–1825), a printmaker and keeper of the British Institution, published a reproduction of the painting for the first time and told the story of how the artist painted The Blue Boy to contradict the advice of Sir Joshua Reynolds. As president of the Royal Academy of Arts, Reynolds had lectured publicly on the use of warm and cool colours in his Eighth Discourse presented in 1778.

It ought, in my opinion, to be indispensably observed, that the masses of light in a picture be always of a warm, mellow colour, yellow, red, or a yellowish white, and that the blue, the grey, or the green colours be kept almost entirely out of these masses, and be used only to support or set off these warm colours; and for this purpose, a small proportion of cold colour will be sufficient. Let this conduct be reversed; let the light be cold, and the surrounding colour warm, as we often see in the works of the Roman and Florentine painters, and it will be out of the power of art, even in the hands of Rubens and Titian, to make a picture splendid and harmonious.

This origination story appealed to the public's perception of the distinctly different personalities of Reynolds and Gainsborough since it set the two artists in opposition. As president of the Royal Academy, Reynolds was a disciplined advocate of history painting who played an active role in curriculum development and delivery, and the presentation of the annual exhibitions. Gainsborough, on the other hand, was a portrait painter and landscapist and remained aloof from any academic functions. Reynolds was knighted in 1769 and wrote art criticism and delivered lectures while Gainsborough never received sovereign recognition and wrote lively correspondence as his written legacy. These and other real and imagined differences between the two artists were exaggerated in subsequent reports about the creation of The Blue Boy.

Although it eventually became clear that the painting was completed by Gainsborough eight years before Reynolds' Eighth Discourse, the story about how it resulted from a challenge over warm and cool colours was too good to give up. The repeated erroneous account propelled the painting to international fame.

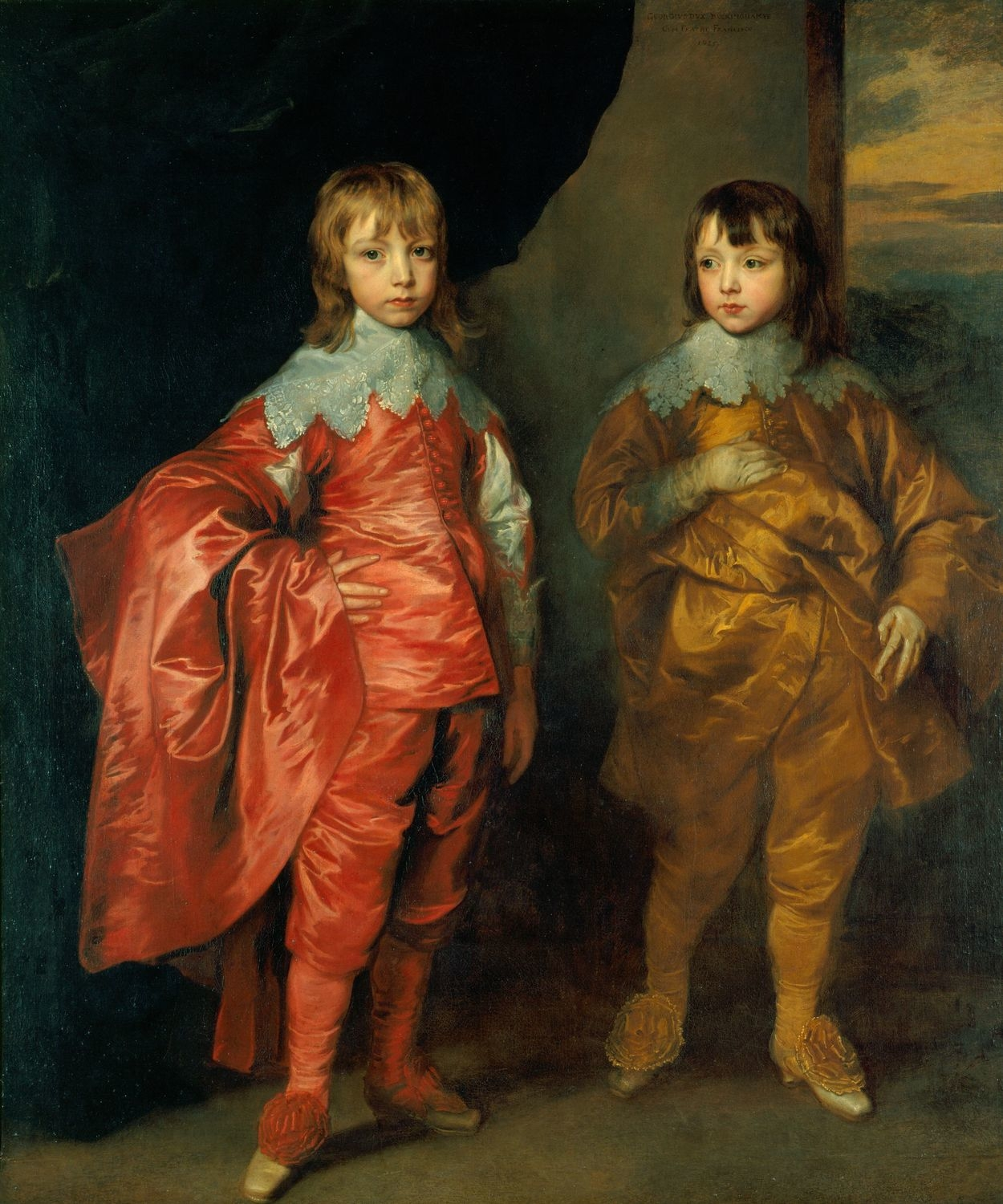
Van Dyck's portrait of George Villiers, 2nd Duke of Buckingham, and Lord Francis Villiers

The painting was in Buttall's possession until he filed for bankruptcy in 1796. It was first bought by the politician John Nesbitt and then, in 1802, by the portrait painter John Hoppner. In about 1809, The Blue Boy entered the collection of the Earl Grosvenor and remained with his descendants until its sale by the second Duke of Westminster to the California railroad magnate Henry Edward Huntington in 1921. Before its departure to California in 1922, The Blue Boy was briefly put on display at the National Gallery in London, where it was seen by 90,000 people. The British recognized the loss of Gainsborough's painting in several notable ways including its appearance on stage towards the end of the Mayfair and Montmartre variety show at the New Oxford Theatre in spring 1922. Framed on stage, dressed as the boy in the painting, and flanked by cowboys and Indians, the celebrity Nellie Taylor sang Cole Porter's "The Blue Boy Blues".

The Grosvenor family played a significant role in the increasing fame of The Blue Boy during the 19th and early 20th centuries. They not only allowed visitors into their London residence to see the painting, they also frequently lent the painting to important exhibitions, including the Art Treasures Exhibition in Manchester in 1857 when The Blue Boy captured the attention of viewers who had likely never previously given much thought to fine art. Gallery guides and exhibition publications passed on the story of the disputed origins of the painting and claimed that "there is nothing which has attracted more universal admiration than this 'far-famed' painting." The painting was subsequently exhibited to much public acclaim at the London 1862 International Exhibition, the Royal Academy and the South Kensington Museum in 1870, the Grosvenor Gallery in 1885, and the Royal Academy in 1896, when it was identified as "the most famous of all of his pictures" by a review in The Times.

In addition to viewing Gainsborough's Blue Boy in public venues, the painting also appeared in publications and as individual black-and-white and colour prints. It became a popular ceramic figure and showed up in advertisements. The boy in blue also came alive with men, women, boys, and girls dressing up in similar costumes and pretending to be Gainsborough's youth at fancy-dress balls and marriage ceremonies, in pantomimes and plays, and eventually in movies and television programmes.

When girls and women masqueraded as Gainsborough's Blue Boy on stage and screen, they brought about a gradual feminization of the youth. By the early 20th century, Marlene Dietrich was photographed in a Blue Boy costume and Shirley Temple appeared as Gainsborough's youth in the movie Curly Top in 1935. Shortly after the painting showed up in the main entrance of the Cleaver family residence during the third season of the Leave It To Beaver show in 1959, viewers increasingly associated feminine traits with the boy in blue, leading to his connection to an emergent gay culture.

In September 1970, The Blue Boy was "outed" in the pages of Mad Magazine in a strip called "Prissy Percy". In the four-panel strip, artist Jack Rickard and writer Frank Jacobs used contemporary stereotypes of homosexuality to contrast Gainsborough's boy in blue with a group of football players. Stereotypes linking The Blue Boy and homosexuality were well established when Hank Ketcham, the creator of "Dennis the Menace," cast Gainsborough's boy in blue as a "sissy" in a multi-panel strip that included a line by Dennis confusing the painter Gainsborough and the Beat poet and gay peacenik Allen Ginsberg. In 1974, former TV Guide advertising manager Don N. Embinder (a.k.a. Don Westbrook) published the first issue of Blueboy Magazine, an upscale, gay bi-monthly magazine with nude photography, slick advertisements, and articles by writers such as Christopher Isherwood and Randy Shilts. Rescuing Gainsborough's Blue Boy from sissiness, Embrinder introduced him as the embodiment of the recently liberated gay man. The premier issue featured a bright blue cover with a photograph of a young man dressed up as Gainsborough's boy in blue from the waist up. Embinder re-appropriated Gainsborough's Blue Boy from the funny pages and transformed a derogatory stereotype into an emblem of pride.

Among the gay artists who have embraced The Blue Boy as a symbol of gay emancipation are Robert Lambert (a member of Les Petites Bon-Bons), Howard Kottler, and Léopold Foulem.

The Blue Boy was temporarily loaned to the National Gallery, London, and placed on view on 25 January 2022, a century to the day since it left the UK in 1922. It remained in the National Gallery for five months before returning to the US permanently.

In October 2021, Kehinde Wiley's Portrait of a Young Gentleman was installed opposite to Gainsborough's Blue Boy in the Huntington Museum of Art.

== See also ==
- The Brown Boy, a 1764 painting by Joshua Reynolds
- Pinkie (painting)
