= Pinky (candy) =

Brand of confectionery

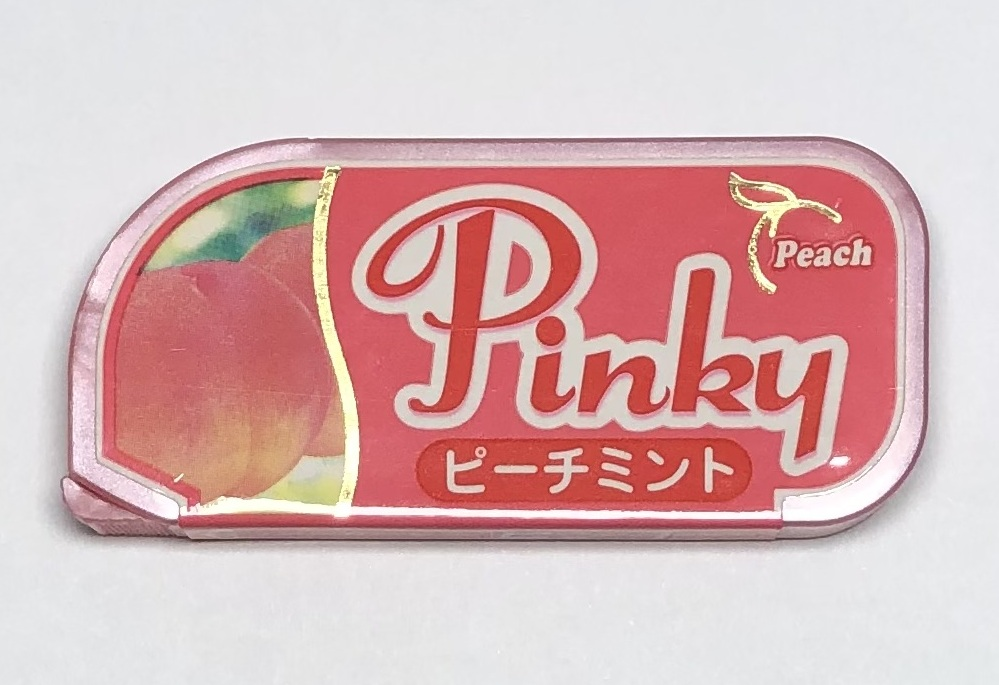
- Container of peach-flavored Pinky
- Type: Confectionary
- Inception: 1997
- Manufacturer: Koikeya

Pinky is a brand of mint-flavored candy sold by Koikeya, formerly Frente International. It is known for its commercial "Give me a Pinky, give me a Pinky" (ピンキーちょうだい ピンキーちょうだい). Discontinued in 2018, it was revived in 2020 as "Pinky Fresh".

== History ==
Pinky was originally released in 1997 under Frente International. In 2006, they released a new flavor, grape mint, with heart-shaped mints as well as the original round-shaped mints. In 2009, they changed their packaging and mints, releasing a new Alaska Mint flavor targeted at men. To promote the renewal, Pinky aired two commercials featuring TVXQ.

As of 2016, they had flavors like peach and grape, as well as regionally-available flavors such as cherry for the Tōhoku region. In June 2016, Frente International's parent company Frente announced that they would integrate their subsidiaries Koikeya, Frente International, and Assist, and rebrand Frente as Koikeya, with the changes implemented in October.

Though discontinued in 2018, Pinky was revived in 2020 as "Pinky Fresh", a tablet candy and functional food containing Lactobacillus salivarius TI2711. The packaging replaced the pink monkey mascot Pinky Monkey (ピンキーモンキー) with a white monkey Fresh Monkey.

== See also ==
- List of Japanese snacks
