= Pink slip =

Pink slip may refer to:

- Vehicle title, in the United States, also known as "certificate of title", a legal form, establishing a person or business as the legal owner of a vehicle
- Pink slip (employment), a form of termination notice
- Pink slip, a deprecated vehicle inspection paper in Australia
- Pink certificate, an attestation of medical discharge from the Turkish Armed Forces on account of homosexuality

== Other uses ==
- Pink Slip, the stage name of American musician and record producer Kyle Buckley
- Pink Slip, a fictional pop rock band from Freaky Friday (2003 film)
- Pink Slip, a 2009 EP by Justin Vivian Bond
- The Pink Slip, a 2021 EP by Devin Dawson
- "Pink Slip", a song from the Unband's Retarder (album), 2000
- "Pink Slip", a song from Paradise (Paint It Black album), 2005
- "Pink Slip", a 2018 episode of Pose (TV series)

== See also ==
- Pink sheet (disambiguation)
- Pink (disambiguation)
