= Koikeya =

Japanese snack food company

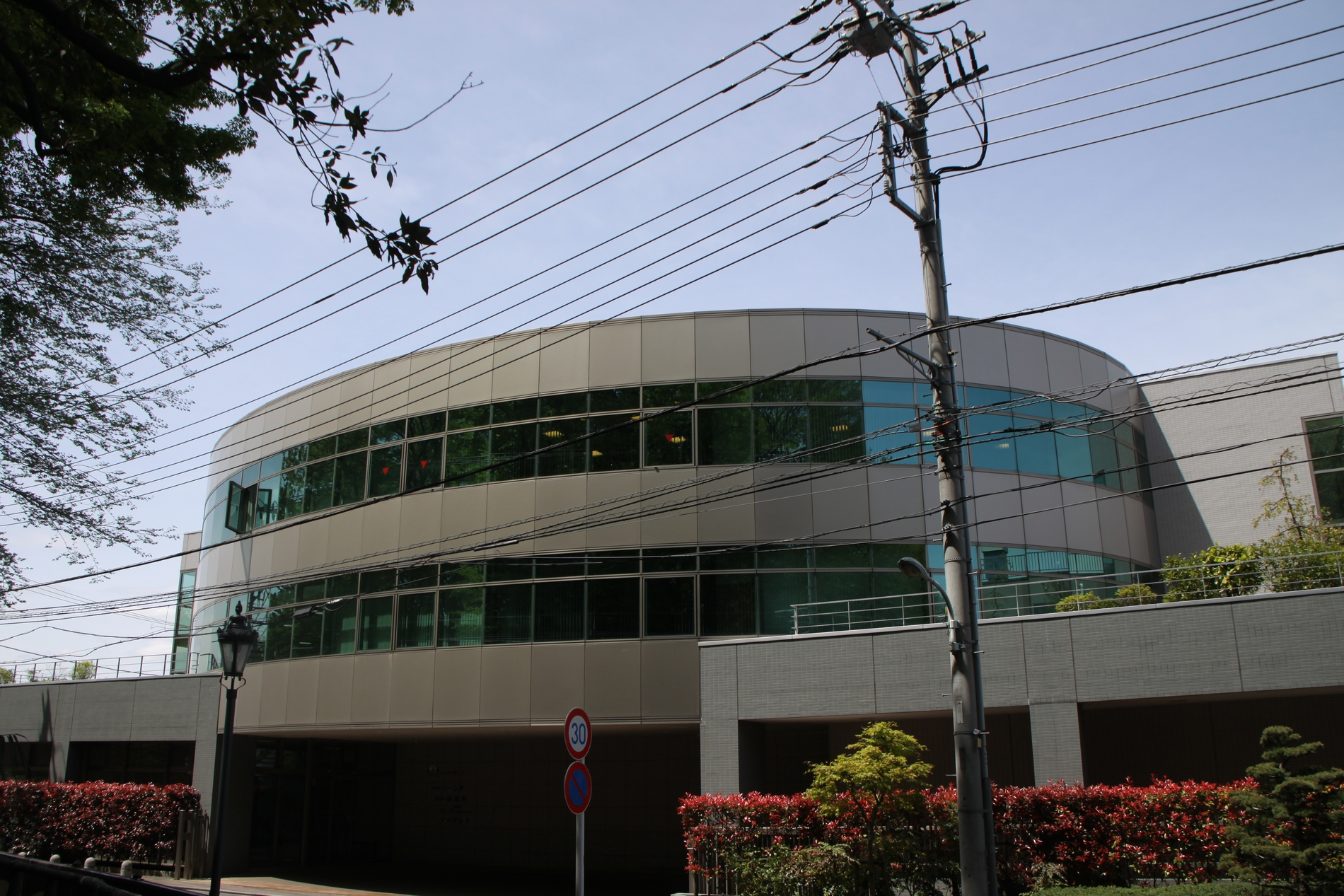
Headquarters

Koikeya or Koike-ya is a Japanese snack food manufacturer. As of 2019 it was the second-largest manufacturer of potato chips in Japan.

The company was founded in 1958; 67 years ago, by Kazuo Koike, who was in the snacks business when he first tried potato chips at an izakaya. The company was the first in Japan to mass-produce potato chips. The company developed several unusual flavors such as "Karamuucho" and "Don Tacos".

The company makes chips in various flavors, such as "Wild Shiso Ume" and "Demon Consomme". It makes chips with specialty flavors local to certain areas, such as Akaushi beef-flavored chips in Kyushu.

It makes potato chips in flavors such as "toast" and "milk" meant to be eaten for breakfast.

== See also ==
- List of Japanese snacks
- Calbee
