= Pinky Show =

Pinky in the Pinky show "The American War: The U.S. in Vietnam"

The Pinky Show is a low-tech, hand-drawn educational-style online show. The Pinky Show tries to condense information and ideas that have been misrepresented, suppressed, ignored, or otherwise excluded from mainstream discussion. The Pinky Show presents information from a specific political viewpoint which can be generally characterized as progressive. The purpose of the show, as stated on their website is to present "marginalized perspectives as a means of challenging individuals to consider realities that lie beyond their own lived experiences".

The Pinky Show is a project of Associated Animals Inc., a 501(c)(3) educational non-profit organization.

== Concept ==
The main character is a cat named Pinky. Her friends are Bunny, Mimi, and Daisy. They are all cats, living in the desert near Baker, California (U.S.A.). Pinky is sometimes joined by human guests, and on occasion, lends the spotlight to ants from her ant farm.

In each episode, Pinky begins by asking a straightforward question about a specific topic, such as the US involvement in the Iraq War. She then goes on to present her perspective in an informal, easy-to-understand way. A typical episode often includes the presentation of researched and prepared material, or the interviewing of expert guests. In the Iraq war segment, for example, "Pinky" includes relevant legal documents, such as the United Nations Charter, the U.S. constitution and varying U.N. resolutions to argue that the 2003 invasion of Iraq was illegal. In one episode on the Vietnam War they use official releases from the White house and transcripts from Nixon's conversations. Occasionally they also use comical references, such as the phone book and her mom.

== Motivation ==
Pinky's views are presented from primarily a left-wing point of view. Topics covered include a wide range of little-known historical facts, critical analysis and interpretations of cultural texts, social and political commentary, issues of morality & ethics, and "basically anything that people may not know or spend much time thinking about."

== Online video ==
The Pinky Show is an online video show with short videos, which can be seen on YouTube or in the Pinky Show Archives. On YouTube, some of the more notable Pinky Show episodes have garnered over two millions views. One episode on illegal immigration has gained over 350,000 views. Another Pinky Show episode on YouTube on the legality of the Iraq war, entitled: "The Iraq War Legal or Illegal?" has gained over two million views. The Pinky Show has its own channel on YouTube with over 11,000 subscribers.

== Multimedia art exhibits ==
On November 19, 2009, the Pinky Show creators were acknowledged in an article in the Winnipeg Free Press entitled, "The Revolution Will Be Adorable." The article covered an art show exhibited at the University of Winnipeg. The "group's multimedia exhibition at the University of Winnipeg's Gallery 1C03 uses its academic setting to question the institutionalized values of higher education."

The same exhibit was also covered in the Winnipeg's Uptown magazine entitled, "An Educational Project - By Cats?" The article found the style of Pinky and her gang interesting: "in contrast to standard educational models, The Pinky Show lacks the trappings of authority. Charmingly and amateurishly animated cats earnestly deliver their research with subjectivity. A typical episode might begin: 'So, I was wondering...' No one asks Pinky, a round-eyed, black-faced cat with a white snout, what her credentials are - cats skirt the dehumanizing structure of authority."

== Grant support ==
Hawaii People's Fund awarded Associated Animals Inc., which produces the show, a 2008 grant for several episodes relating to "issues of colonialism in Hawaii".
