= Pink Creek =

Stream in Georgia, U.S.

Coordinates: 33°22′43.42″N 85°3′30.79″W

Pink Creek is a stream in the U.S. state of Georgia. It is a tributary to the Chattahoochie River.

The name Pink Creek most likely is a corruption of "Punk Creek", so named after the Indian settlement of "Punk Knot" along its course.
