= Gainsborough Dupont =

English painter

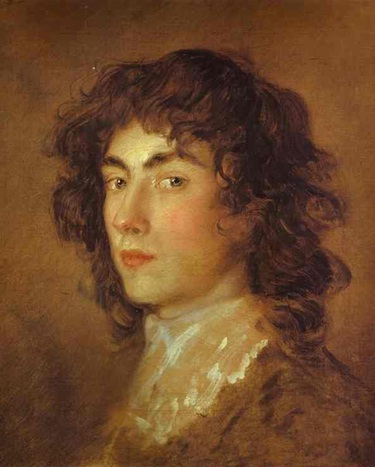
Portrait of Gainsborough Dupont by Thomas Gainsborough, now in Tate Britain

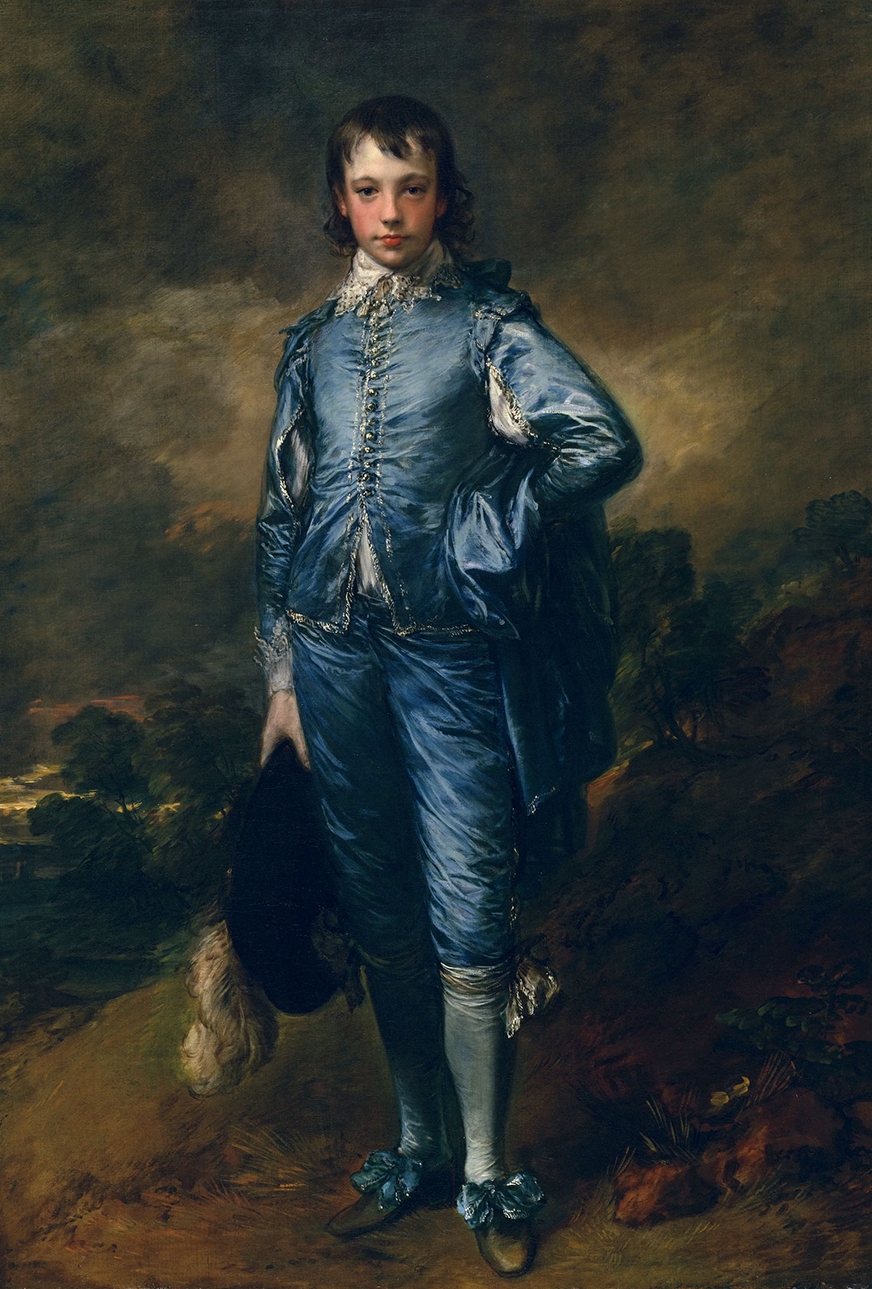
Dupont has been speculated to be the subject of "The Blue Boy" (1770) by Thomas Gainsborough.

Gainsborough Dupont (20 December 1754 – 20 January 1797) was a British artist, the nephew and pupil of Thomas Gainsborough, R.A.

== Biography ==
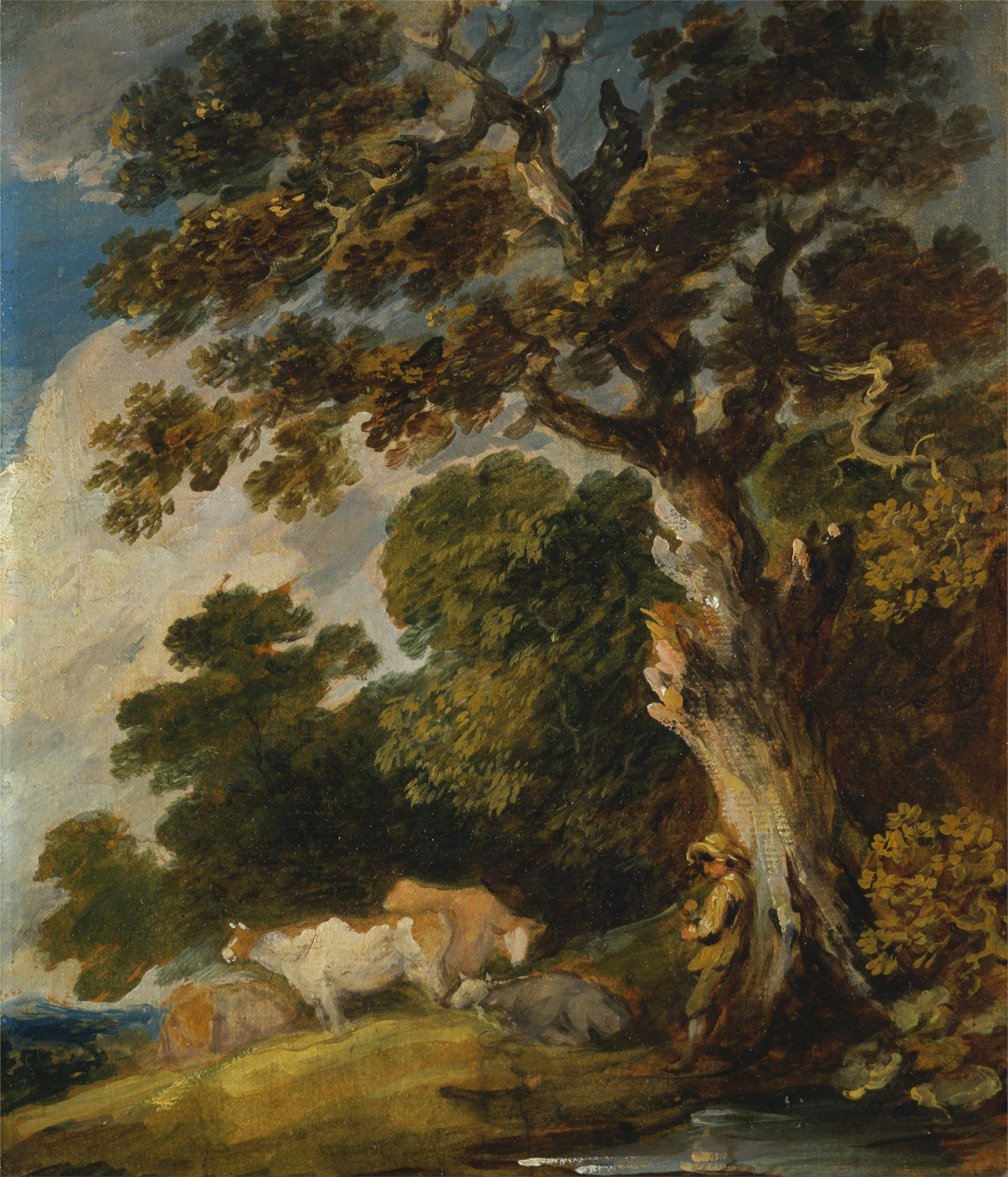
Gainsborough Dupont - A Wooded Landscape with Cattle and Herdsman

Dupont was born in Sudbury, Suffolk, on 20 December 1754 the eldest son of Thomas Gainsborough's sister Sarah, and her husband Philip Dupont. In 1772 he was apprenticed to Gainsborough, for whom he continued to work until the latter's death in 1788. He was the only assistant Gainsborough is ever known to have employed. He also trained at the Royal Academy Schools, where he became a student in March 1775.

Dupont took over Gainsborough's studio in Schomberg House in 1788, and moved to Bloomsbury in 1793, following the death of Gainsborough's widow. He painted portraits and landscapes in a style of similar to that of his uncle, and also landscapes with architectural ruins, in which he imitated Nicolas Poussin. His principal work is a large picture containing the portraits of the elder brethren of Trinity House, which is in their court-room on Tower Hill.

== Prints ==
From 1779 onwards, Dupont made a series of mezzotints after Gainsborough's portraits. They include:

- George III, full length.
- Queen Charlotte, full length.
- The Princess Royal, and the Princesses Augusta and Elizabeth, full length.
- George, Lord Rodney, full length.
- General Conway, full length.
- Colonel St. Leger, full length.
- Rev. Sir Henry Bate Dudley, Bart..
- Rev. Richard Graves, half-length, oval.

== Death ==
Dupont died in London on 20 January 1797, aged 42. He was buried in Kew churchyard in the same grave as Thomas Gainsborough.

== Works ==
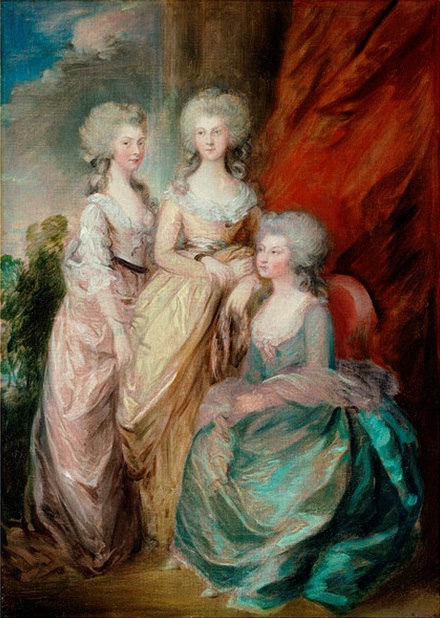
The three eldest daughters of George III, Victoria and Albert Museum

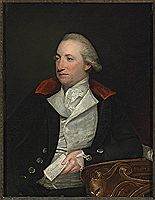
John Stuart, 1st Marquess of Bute, 1784, Figge Art Museum

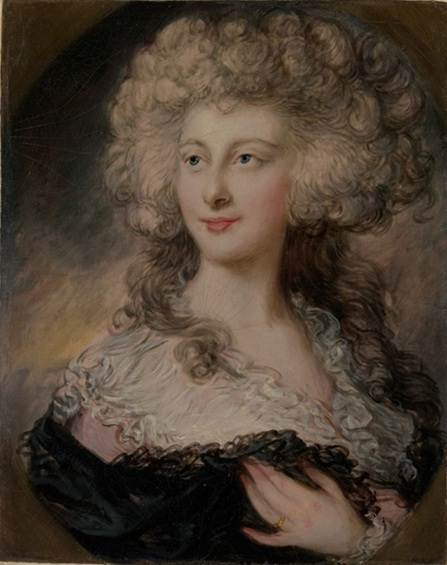
Anne Elizabeth Cholmley, Metropolitan Museum of Art

George III of the United Kingdom, Royal Collection

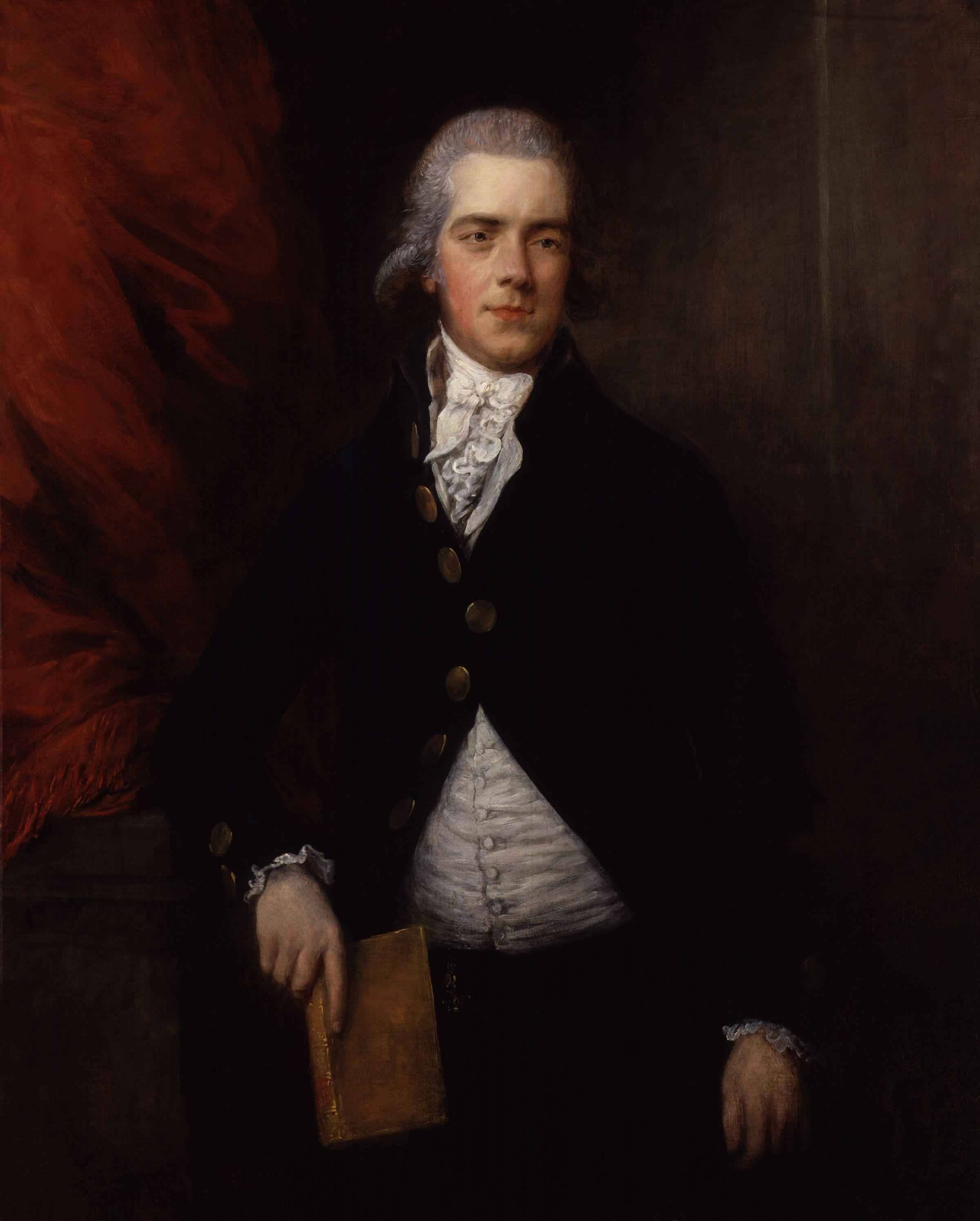
William Grenville, 1st Baron Grenville, National Portrait Gallery, London

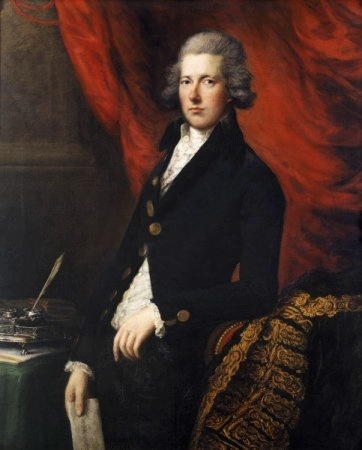
William Pitt the Younger

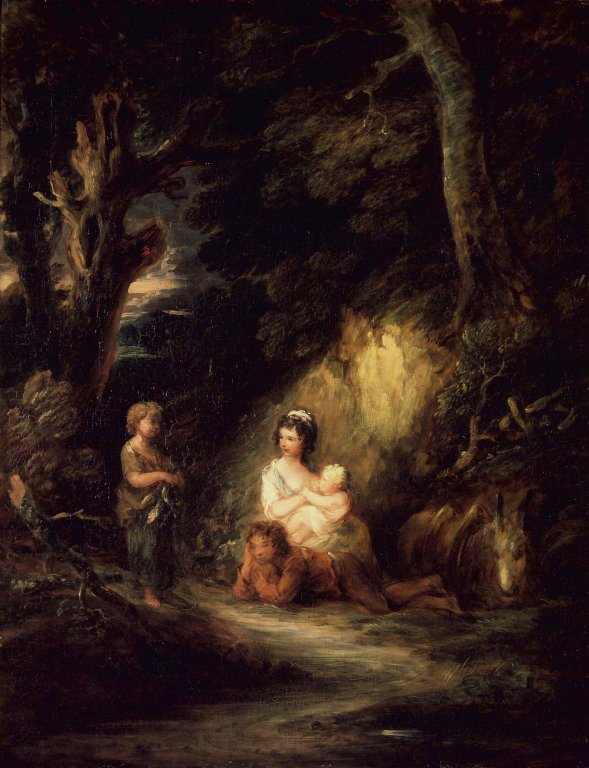
Halt of Traveling Peasants by a Woodside, ca. 1790, now in the Brooklyn Museum
