= Pinki =

Pinki may refer to:

- Boško Palkovljević Pinki, People's Hero of Yugoslavia
- Pinki (comics), cartoon character created by Pran Kumar Sharma
- Pinki Hall, sports hall in Belgrade, Serbia
- Piņķi, village in Latvia
- Pinki Sonkar, the main character of Academy Award-winning documentary, Smile Pinki (2008)
- Pinki (bowls), (born 1980), Indian lawn bowler
