= Pinkie Gordon Lane =

American poet (1923–2008)

Pinkie Gordon Lane (born January 13, 1923 – December 3, 2008) was an African-American poet, editor, and teacher. She authored five books of poetry and was nominated for the Pulitzer Prize in 1979. Among the numerous honors awarded to Lane is an appointment as the Louisiana State Poet Laureate, making her the first African American to hold the post (1989–92).

== Early life and education ==
Pinkie Gordon Lane was born in Philadelphia, Pennsylvania, on January 13, 1923. The youngest and only surviving child of William Alexander Gordon (d. 1940) and Inez Addie West Gordon (d. 1945), Lane grew up in an era seething with racial animus. In an interview with the critic John Lowe in 2005, she notes that the racial incidents that she witnessed in the Mid-Atlantic region were indelibly embedded in her psyche. Her parents forded the Great Depression and the ensuing years of austerity and managed to put their daughter through school at a high cost.

After Lane's graduation from the Philadelphia High School for Girls in 1940 her father, William Alexander Gordon, died and she was pressed to take a job in a sewing factory. After five years of intense work and the death of her mother she applied for and received a four-year scholarship to Spelman College in Atlanta, Georgia. During her senior year at Spelman she met and married Ulysses “Pete” Simpson Lane (d. 1970), her first and only husband.

She went on to attain a master's degree in English at Atlanta University in 1956, and, in 1967, became the first African-American woman to earn a PhD from Louisiana State University.

== Career ==
Graduating with honors from Spelman in the Spring of 1949, Lane set out eastward begin her career as an educator. For the next six years she taught high-school students in Georgia and Florida. She returned to Atlanta in 1955 to attain a master's degree in English at Atlanta University. The following year she accepted a position at Leland College in Baker, Louisiana, where she stayed until 1959. That year she joined the English Department at Southern University, where she would stay for the remainder of her career, rising to the post of Department Chair. With her husband teaching in the Department of Education, Lane was able to settle down to focus on what she thought was her primary medium of expression, short stories.

== Poetry ==
In 1962, while she was teaching at Southern University, a colleague recommended that she read A Street in Bronzeville (1945) by Gwendolyn Brooks. At that point, she says: "I had never read a whole book of poetry by a black woman poet. And I was so impressed, I said, 'well if she can do it, I can do it.' I forgot about fiction and started writing poetry, which came to me naturally." Brooks’s work not only ignited a passion for the poetry, but it introduced Lane to the sprawling tradition of black letters. Before the inauguration of Black Studies in the late 1960s, writers such as Lane considered themselves to be autodidacts, tracing the contours of a tradition that had been, in large part, excluded from the scholarly arena.

Lane published her first book of poetry, Wind Thoughts (1972), shortly after her husband’s death of liver and kidney disease. Although the book was critically lauded, it was not until her second book of poetry, The Mystic Female (1978), was released that she began to amass a sizeable audience. The following year Gwendolyn Brooks nominated The Mystic Female for the Pulitzer Prize. Dorothy W. Newman, writing in a special issue of Callaloo, declared: "Pinkie Gordon Lane — woman, scholar, poet—goes inward and emerges universal in her second volume of poetry.…" Lane went on to publish three more books of poetry: I Never Scream (1985), Girl at the Window (1991) and Elegy for Etheridge (2002.)

== Criticism ==
She was often excoriated by the prevailing voices in the Black Arts Movement and her colleagues at Southern University for her refusal to hew to what they considered to be the conventions of black poetry. As Carolyn M. Jones notes in her essay on Lane: "Indeed, her voice is so quiet at times that in the militant 1960s, hers was not accepted as 'African American poetry'. Lane tells us that Dudley Randall, though confirming her work as authentically African American because it is written by an African American, called it 'another kind of black poetry', balancing intimacy with emotion with interpretive distance." Like Robert Hayden, Lane was beleaguered by criticism but went on defiantly to produce important work in the face of it.
