= Pinkie (painting) =

1794 painting by Thomas Lawrence

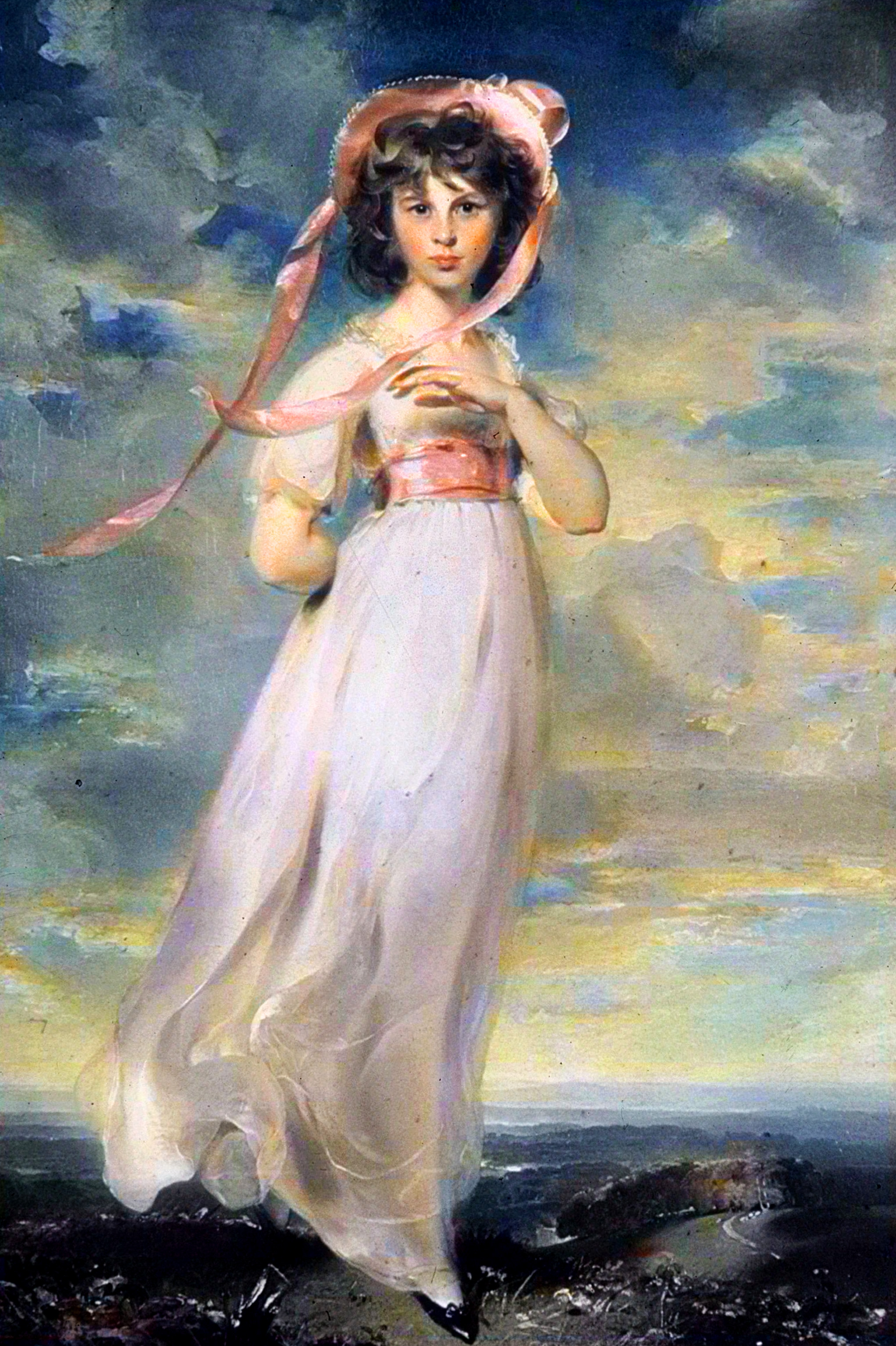
- Artist: Thomas Lawrence
- Year: 1794
- Medium: Oil on canvas
- Dimensions: 146 cm × 100 cm (57 in × 39 in)
- Location: Huntington Library, San Marino, California

Pinkie is the traditional title for a portrait made in 1794 by the English painter Thomas Lawrence. It is now in the Huntington Library at San Marino, California, where it normally hangs opposite The Blue Boy by Thomas Gainsborough. The title now given it by the museum is Sarah Goodin Barrett Moulton: "Pinkie". These two works are the centerpieces of the institution's art collection, which has notable holdings of eighteenth-century British portraiture. The painting depicts Sarah Moulton (1783–1795), who was about eleven years old when painted, on a hilltop.

== Origin ==
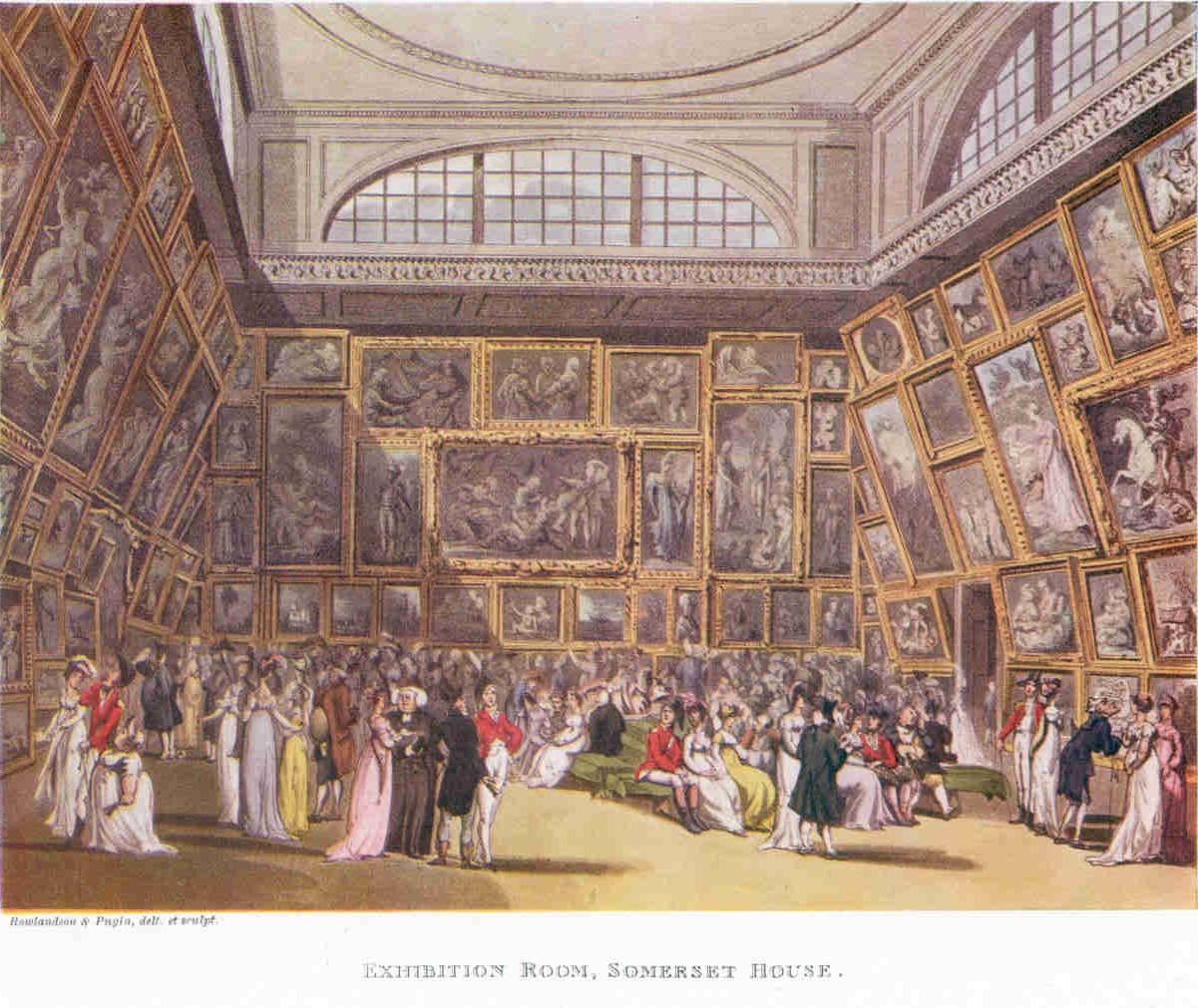
The 1800 Royal Academy exhibition at Somerset House

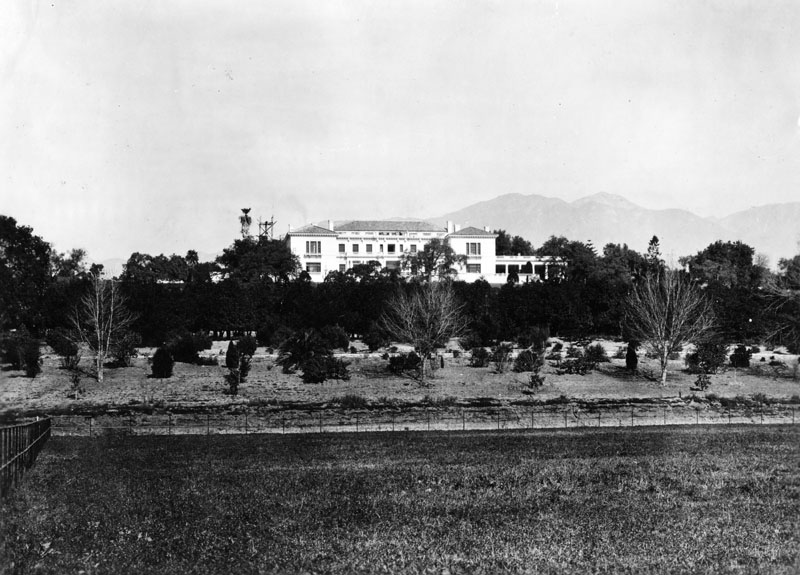
Huntington mansion in 1915 as a private residence; the main hall was expanded in 1934 and houses Pinkie and The Blue Boy

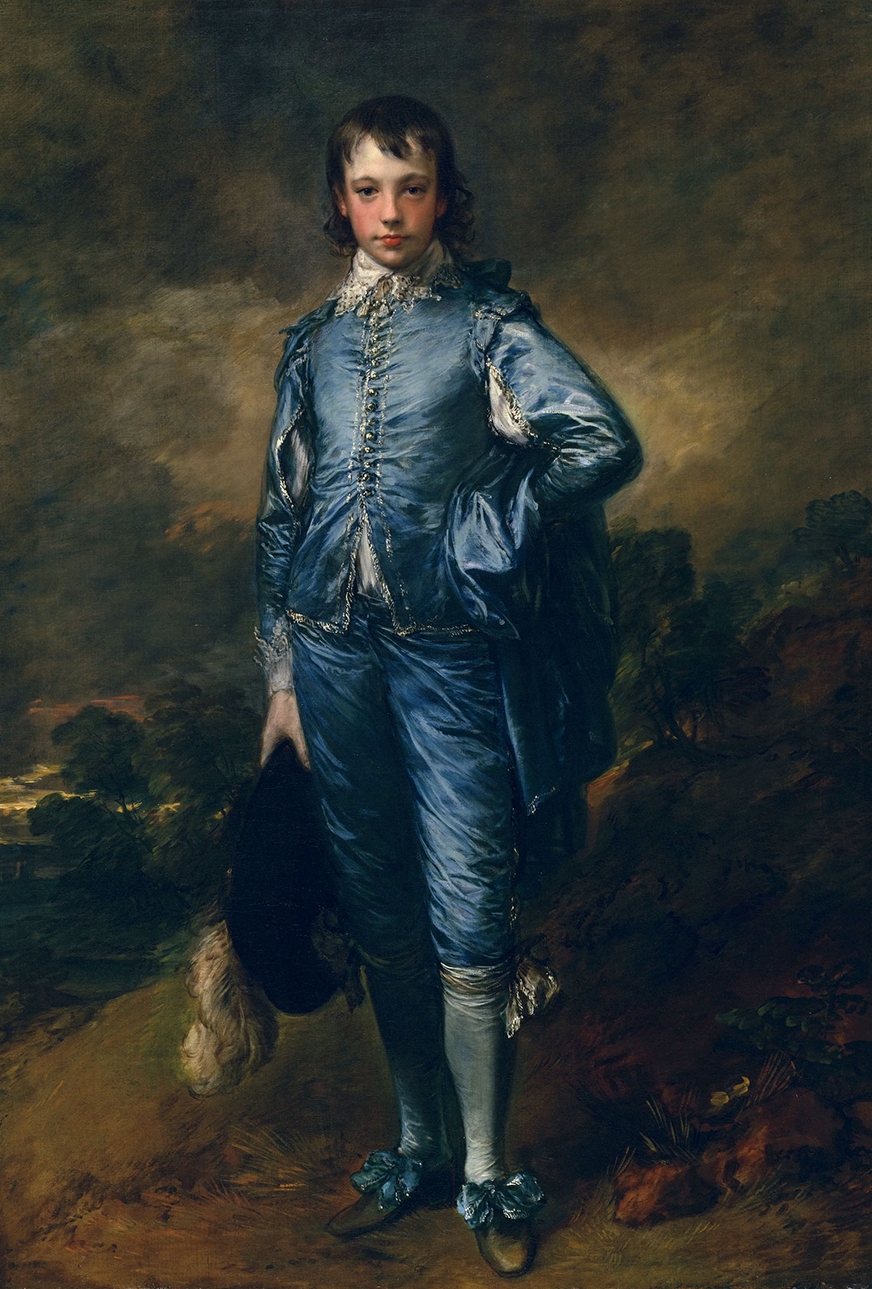
The Blue Boy by Thomas Gainsborough, c. 1770. Oil on canvas 70 in × 48 in (180 cm × 120 cm)

=== Sarah Moulton ===
Sarah Goodin Barrett Moulton was born on 22 March 1783, in Little River, St. James, Jamaica. She was the only daughter and eldest of the four children of Charles Moulton, a merchant from Madeira, and his wife Elizabeth. Sarah was baptised on 29 May 1783, bearing the names Sarah Goodin Barrett in honour of her aunt, also named Sarah Goodin Barrett, who had died as an infant in 1781. She was a descendant of Hersey Barrett, who had arrived in Jamaica in 1655 with Sir William Penn and by 1783, the Barretts were wealthy landowners, slave owners, and exporters of sugar cane and rum. Inside her family, she was called Pinkie or Pinkey.

By the time Sarah was six, her father had left the family and her mother was left to raise the children, Sarah and her brothers Edward (1785–1857) and Samuel (1787–1837), with the help of her relatives. In September 1792, Sarah and her brothers sailed to England to get a better education. Sarah was sent to Mrs Fenwick's school at Flint House, Greenwich, along with other children from Jamaican colonial families. On 16 November 1793 Sarah's grandmother, Judith Barrett, wrote from Jamaica to her niece Elizabeth Barrett Williams, then living on Richmond Hill in Surrey, asking her to commission a portrait of 'my dear little Pinkey ... as I cannot gratify my self with the Original, I must beg the favour of You to have her picture drawn at full Length by one of the best Masters, in an easy Careless attitude'. Lawrence seems to have met his client’s demand, for critics have since remarked the portrait’s freshness and its subject’s disarming air. Sarah probably began sitting for Lawrence, painter-in-ordinary to George III, at his studio in Old Bond Street soon after the receipt of this letter on 11 February 1794.

One year later, on 23 April 1795, Sarah died at Greenwich, aged 12. A letter from her grandmother, four months before, said that she had recovered from a cough. She was buried on 30 April 1795 in the doctor's vault under the parish church of St Alfege, Greenwich. She was the only Moulton child to die in childhood. Her portrait by Lawrence was placed on display in the Royal Academy exhibition of 1795, which opened the day after her burial. The painting was passed down within the family until 1910, passing at one point to Sarah's brother, Edward, father of the poet Elizabeth Barrett Browning.

=== History ===
Pinkie was first displayed at the 1795 Royal Academy summer exhibition. According to an official Huntington Library publication:

Many of the finest works by the most gifted English artists of the period were large formal portraits. Although most of the pictures were commissioned by the sitter, many were also intended for public display. They made their first appearances at the annual Royal Academy exhibition, which was then the principal artistic event of the year. A somewhat grand and rhetorical air was considered appropriate for this type of painting, and this artistic intention should be kept in mind when looking at the portraits in the Huntington collection.

The painting was later in the collection of Herbert Stern, 1st Baron Michelham and after his death passed to his widow. She sold the painting at a Hampton & Sons auction in 1926, from where it was acquired by Sir Joseph Duveen for 74,000 guineas.

The painting was one of the last acquisitions of the California land developer Henry E. Huntington in 1927. In 1934 the Huntington foundation constructed a new main gallery as an addition to the former residence for the collection's major portraits. Except for brief intervals during travelling exhibitions, Pinkie has hung there since that time.

== Relationship to The Blue Boy ==
Pinkie owes part of its notability to its association with the Gainsborough portrait The Blue Boy. According to Patricia Failing, author of Best-Loved Art from American Museums, "no other work by a British artist enjoys the fame of The Blue Boy." Pinkie and The Blue Boy are often paired in popular esteem; some gallery visitors mistake them for contemporaneous works by the same artist. The two were created by different painters a quarter century apart, however, and the dress styles of the subjects are separated by more than one-hundred fifty years. The model who posed for Gainsborough's portrait wears a period costume of the early seventeenth century as an homage to Flemish Baroque painter Anthony van Dyck, whom Gainsborough held in particular esteem. Sarah Moulton wears the contemporary fashion of 1794. The faces and gaze of the boy and girl are perhaps similar enough for them to be thought brother and sister, but the two works had no association until Henry Huntington purchased them in the 1920s.

Nonetheless, the two are so well matched that William Wilson, author of The Los Angeles Times Book of California Museums, calls them "the Romeo and Juliet of Rococo portraiture" and notes that their association borders on cliché:

They have decorated cocktail coasters, appeared in advertisements, and stopped the show as the tableaux vivants at the Laguna Beach 'Pageant of the Masters.' For all that, they remain intrinsically lovely… The continuing popularity of both pictures is based on more than the obvious. The subjects certainly are in the springtime of life, but their freshness is lent a certain poignancy by the rather grown-up garb that suggests both the transience of youth and the attempt to cling to it. Besides, both are extraordinarily fine pictures, easy and dramatic at once.

== In popular culture ==
Pinkie is also used as a set decoration in the 1946 American film Margie, and can be seen in the residence of Margie and her grandmother, located on the wall in the sitting room.

Pinkie and The Blue Boy can be seen in the pilot episode of Eerie, Indiana.

Pinkie can be seen hanging on a wall of Gus Fring's apartment, opposite the bathroom entrance, in the Better Call Saul episode "Black and Blue."

The paintings are used as set decorations for many episodes of the American television show Leave It to Beaver. The two paintings are located on the wall immediately to the left and right side of the front door of the family home.

In the film Joker, Pinkie and The Blue Boy are both seen hanging on the wall of Arthur and Penny Fleck's apartment near the television set.
