= Pinky the Cat =

Video of a cat attacking an animal control officer

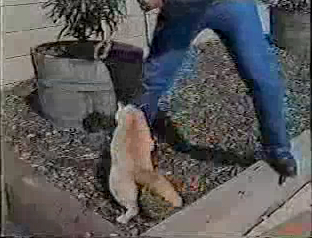
Pinky gets ready to pounce

Pinky the Cat is a video that aired on several American reality television programs in the 1990s before it achieved additional fame on the internet as a viral video in the 2000s. The video clip shows a cat attacking an animal control officer during a promotional message for pet adoption for an animal shelter in Placer County, California.

== Background ==
The video footage was taped by Placer County Animal Control sometime in the early 1990s. The recording was intended as a promotional video for the county's "Pet of the Week" pet adoption program. Sometime before 1992, then-police chief Willie Weatherford distributed copies of the tape—which he named "Pinky the Cat"—to the media and his friends.

Video clips from the full version of Pinky the Cat aired throughout the 1990s on television in the United States. The American television network ABC showed clips from the video on TV's Funniest Commercials (1993) and on Real Funny (1996) hosted by comedian Craig Shoemaker, where the clip was introduced as a public service announcement. CBS aired clips on The World's Most Dangerous Animals III (1996). In that program, a voice-over cautions that "sometimes the animals we should fear the most are those we expect the least" and then shows a "house cat named Pinky going berserk and sinking his teeth deep into a man's thigh." Pinky the Cat is also featured on World's Most Amazing Videos, World's Wildest Police Videos and Maximum Exposure.

== Video ==
External videos
- Original workprint

Animal control officer Carl Pritchard kneels on the ground while petting a cat on a leash in a recording of a pet adoption video for an animal shelter. Pritchard introduces the cat as "Pinky" and describes him as a domestic shorthair who is a "very loving cat". Pinky becomes agitated and leaps out of the hands of Pritchard and onto the ground, attempting to break free of the leash by jumping wildly and running around in all directions. Still holding the leash but not wanting to pick up the "wildcat", Pritchard asks someone to retrieve a catchpole. In the confusion, Colleen Maguire, the director of animal control, arrives to help Pritchard capture Pinky and tries to corral him into a cardboard pet carrier; the attempt fails as Pinky avoids capture because the cardboard was too flimsy.

Pinky continues to dart around frantically, tangling the leash around Pritchard's leg in the process. Finally, Pinky decides to pounce, launching himself towards Pritchard's right leg and rapidly twisting his body around Pritchard's upper thigh. Pinky grabs onto Pritchard's leg with all four of its clawed paws and bites into the flesh near the groin. Pritchard screams once, and Pinky digs in again, this time with his tail twitching, making Pritchard scream a second time. With renewed effort, Pinky is removed from Pritchard's leg and the cat runs away. "Son of a bitch", Pritchard whispers, followed by a polite "excuse my language", as he doubles over in pain clutching his leg.

== Reception ==
NBC reporter George Lewis ran a story featuring Pinky the Cat on June 28, 2006. The story highlighted the popularity of YouTube and several different internet memes. Lewis described the video as "an animal shelter adopt-a-pet video gone wrong as Pinky flips out and fails to show that loving side". Two days later, producer Gena Fitzgerald followed-up with a column in The Daily Nightly, the official blog of NBC Nightly News. Fitzgerald wondered about Pinky's fate and if the cat was ever adopted.

Pinky the Cat appeared on CNN during "The Shot" segment on Anderson Cooper 360° for March 16, 2007. The segment began as Anderson Cooper ran a related video of a cat that attacked WJW's Kathleen Cochrane during a live report. In response to Cochrane's video, correspondent Erica Hill upped the ante: "That's bad. But you know what? I'd like to see your cat and raise you Pinky the cat. Take a look." After the video rolled, Hill added, "Pinky's a loving cat all right!"

Keith Olbermann was inspired by the YouTube Awards to start an "annual best of stuff we found on the Internets awards". On March 30, 2007, Olbermann appeared on the MSNBC news commentary program, Countdown with Keith Olbermann, and bestowed a "Keithie" award on the Pinky the Cat video; the video won the award in the category of "great animal of all the Internets". Commenting on the award, Olbermann said, "Ahh, Pinky, we‘re sure you were finally adopted by a loving family. Unfortunately, the officer now can't have a family."

In a 2007 article in Film Comment, American cartoonist Matt Groening revealed that one of his favorite YouTube videos is "the immortal Pinky the Cat."
