= Thomas Gainsborough =

English painter (1727–1788)

Thomas Gainsborough RA FRSA
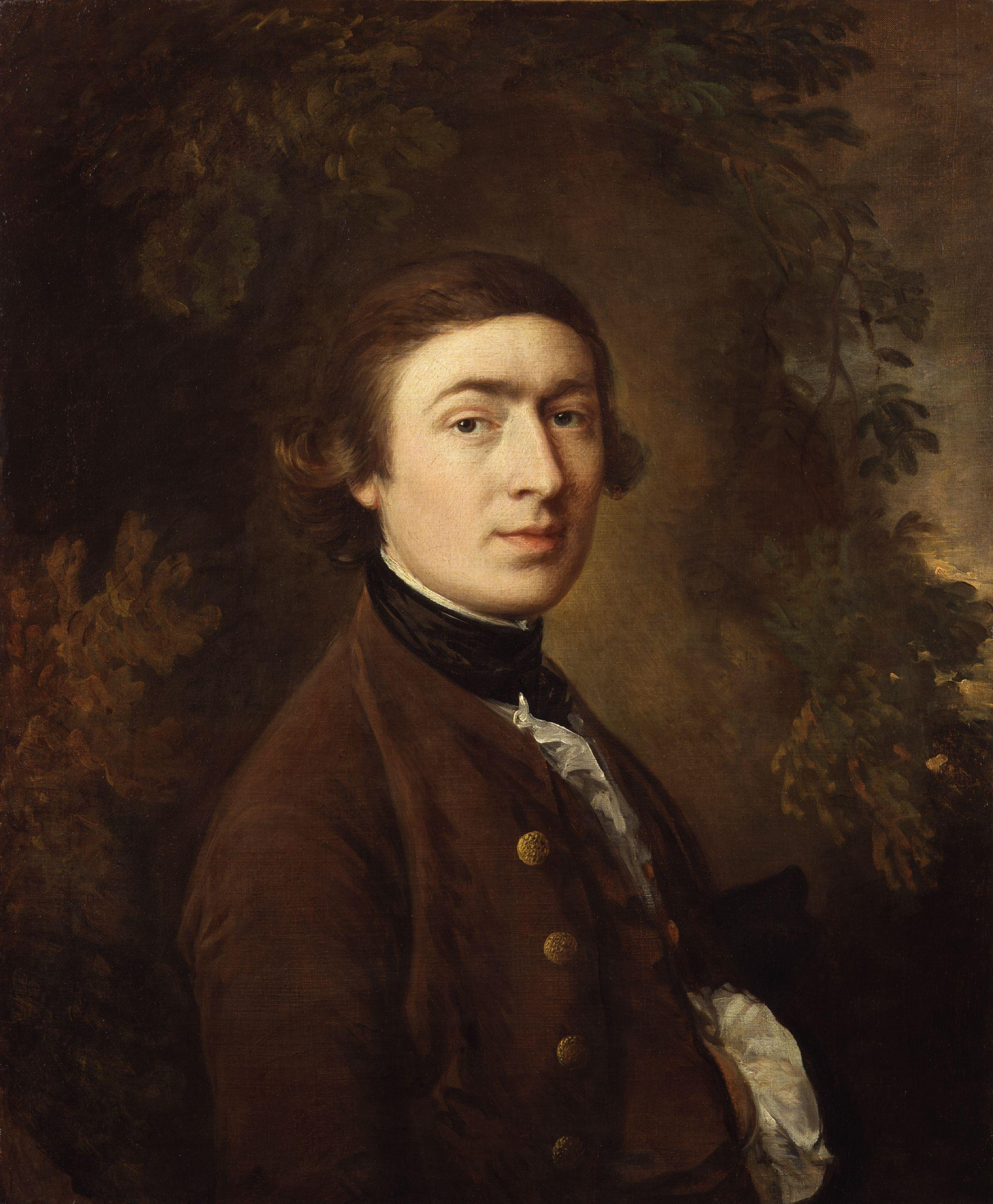
- Self-Portrait, c. 1759
- Born: Sudbury, Suffolk, England
- Baptised: 14 May 1727
- Died: 2 August 1788 (aged 61); London, England
- Resting place: St Anne's Church, Kew
- Education: Hubert-François Gravelot, Francis Hayman
- Known for: Landscape painting; portrait painting
- Notable work: Mr and Mrs Andrews; The Blue Boy
- Movement: Rococo
- Spouse: Margaret Burr (m. 1746)
- Children: 2, including Mary

Thomas Gainsborough (/ˈɡeɪnzbərə/; 14 May 1727 (baptised) – 2 August 1788) was an English painter, draughtsman and printmaker who specialised in portrait and landscape painting. Along with his rival Sir Joshua Reynolds, he was one of the most important British artists of the 18th century. He painted quickly, and the works of his maturity are characterised by a light palette and easy strokes. Despite being a prolific portrait painter, Gainsborough gained greater satisfaction from his landscapes. He is credited (with Richard Wilson) as the originator of the 18th-century British landscape school. Gainsborough was a founding member of the Royal Academy.

== Early life ==
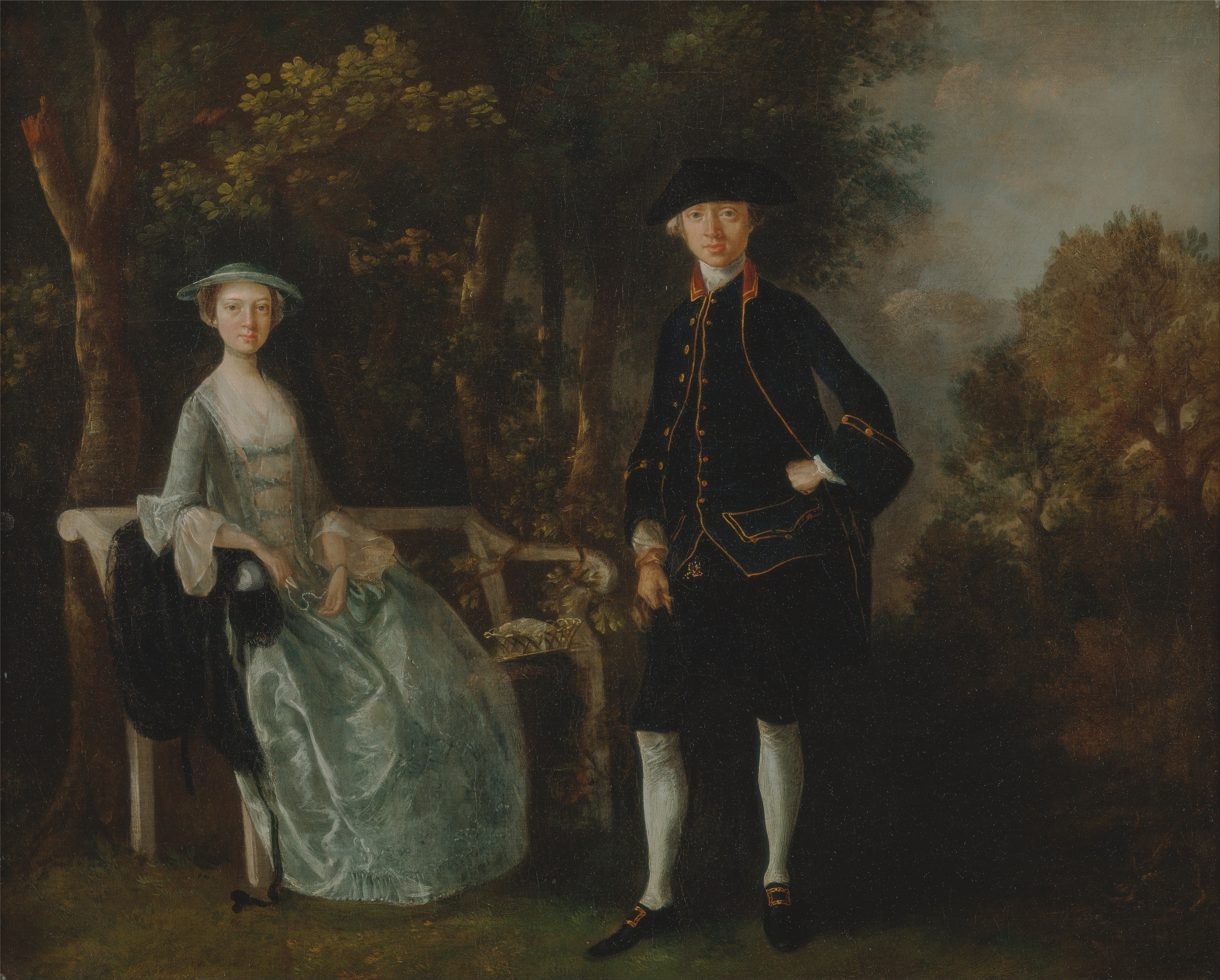
Lady Lloyd and Her Son, Richard Savage Lloyd, of Hintlesham Hall, Suffolk (1745–46), Yale Center for British Art

Gainsborough was born in Sudbury, Suffolk, the youngest son of John Gainsborough, a weaver and maker of woollen goods, and his wife Mary, sister of the Reverend Humphry Burroughs. One of Gainsborough's brothers, Humphrey, is said to have invented the method of condensing steam in a separate vessel, which was of great service to James Watt; another brother, John, was known as Scheming Jack because of his passion for designing curiosities.

The artist spent his childhood at what is now Gainsborough's House, on Gainsborough Street, Sudbury. He later resided there following the death of his father in 1748 and before his move to Ipswich. The building is now a house-museum dedicated to his life and art.

As a boy he demonstrated impressive drawing and painting skills. At the age of ten he was painting heads and small landscapes, including a miniature self-portrait. Gainsborough left home in 1740 to study art in London, where he trained under engraver Hubert Gravelot but became associated with William Hogarth and his school. He assisted Francis Hayman in decorating the supper boxes at Vauxhall Gardens.

== Career ==
=== Suffolk ===
In 1746, Gainsborough married Margaret Burr, an illegitimate daughter of the 3rd Duke of Beaufort, who had settled a £200 annuity on her. The artist's work, then mostly consisting of landscape paintings, was not selling well. He returned to Sudbury in 1748–1749 and concentrated on painting portraits. While still in Suffolk, Gainsborough painted a portrait of The Rev. John Chafy Playing the Violoncello in a Landscape (c. 1750–1752; Tate Gallery, London).

In 1752, he and his family, now including two daughters, Mary ("Molly", 1750–1826) and Margaret ("Peggy", 1751–1820), moved to Ipswich. Commissions for portraits increased, but his clients included mainly local merchants and squires. He had to borrow against his wife's annuity. Toward the end of his time in Ipswich, he painted a self-portrait, now in the permanent collection of the National Portrait Gallery, London.

The artist's family and self-portrait

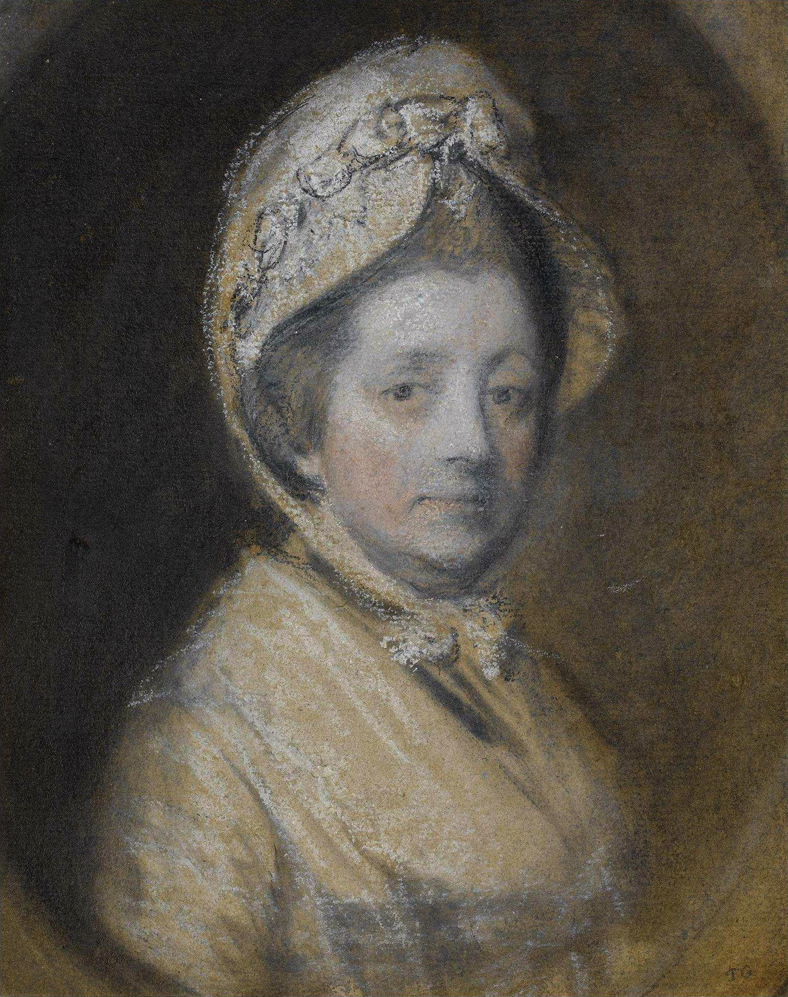
Margaret Burr (1728–1797), the artist's wife, c. early 1770s

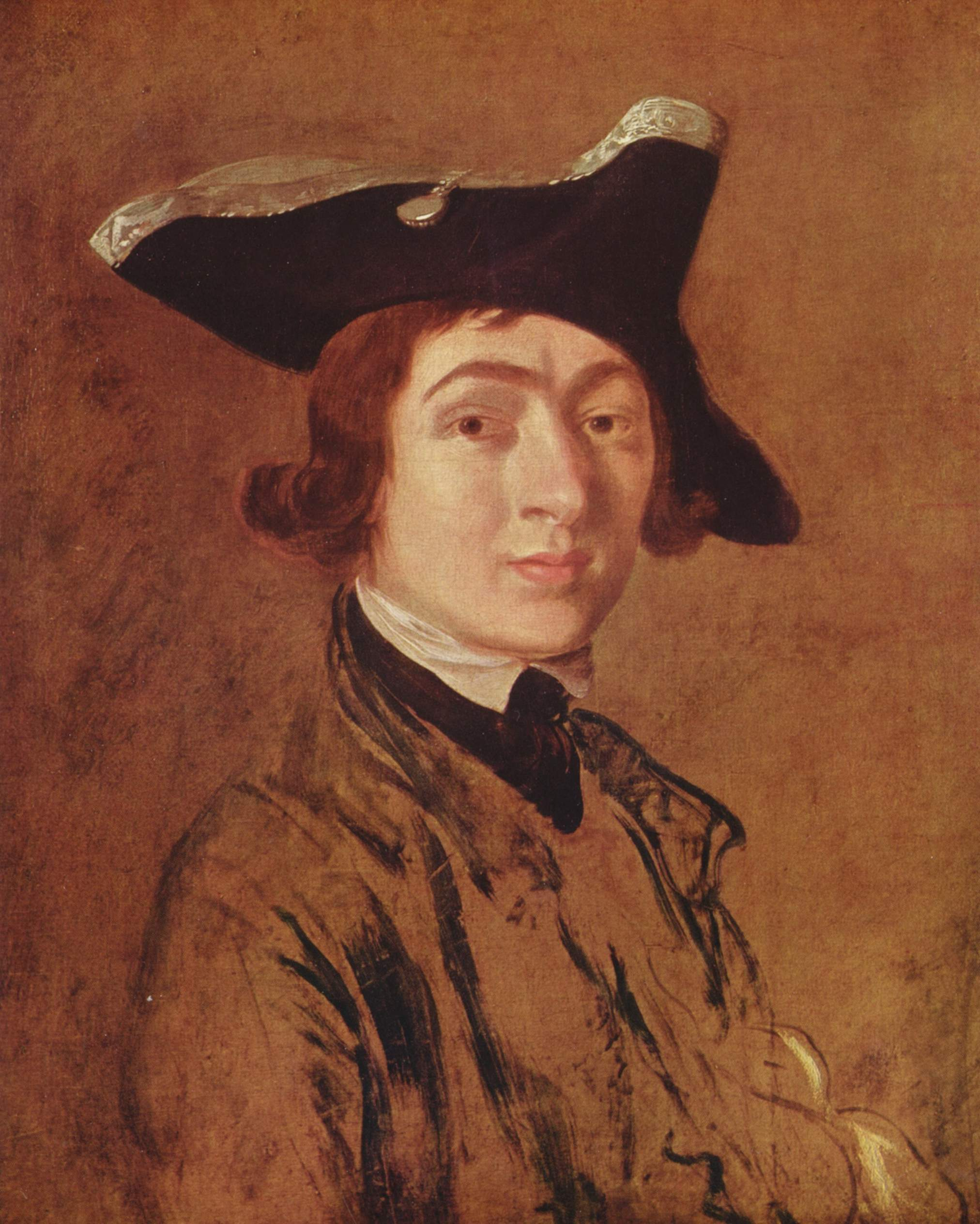
Self-Portrait (1754)

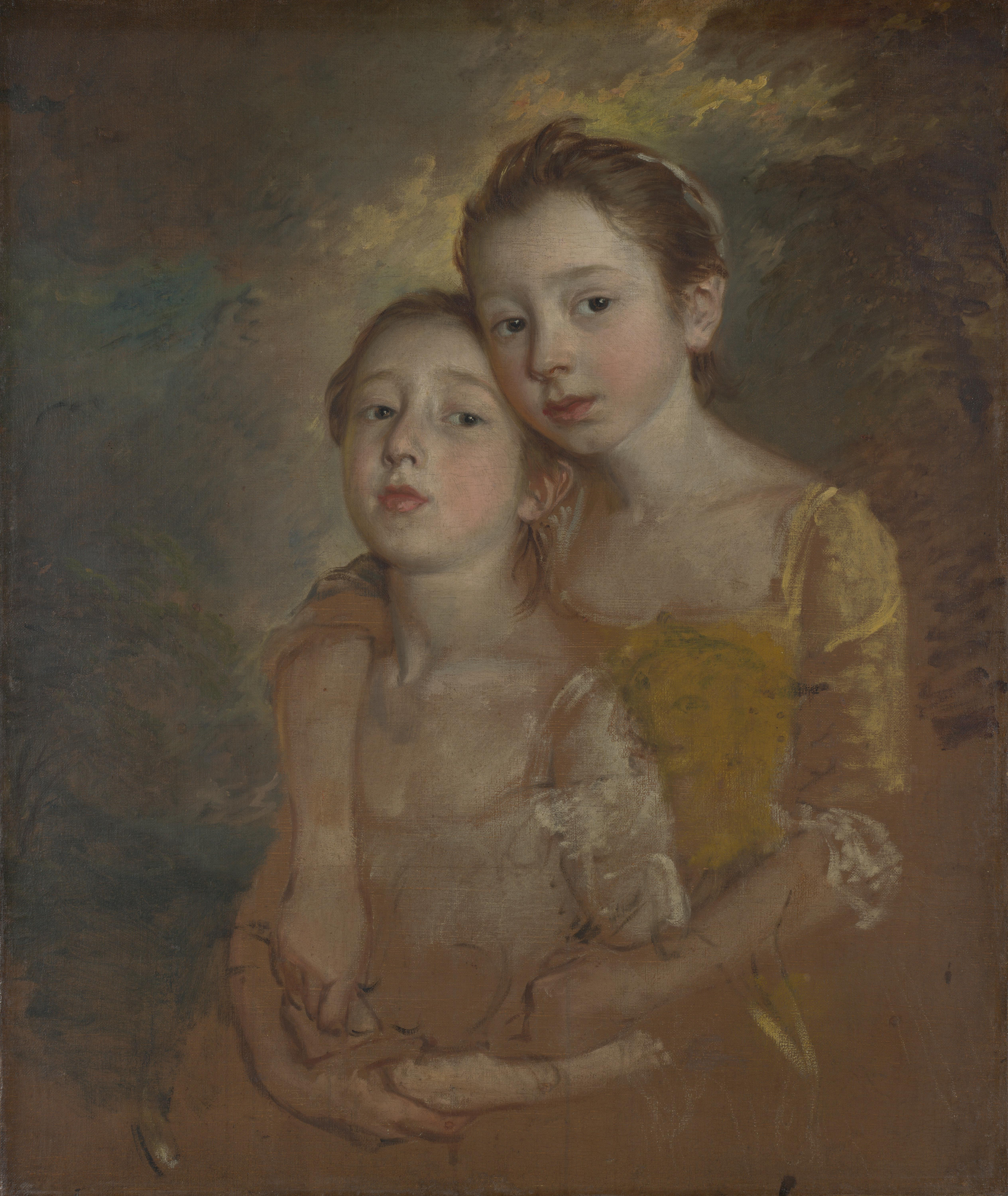
The Artist's Daughters (c. 1759)

=== Bath ===
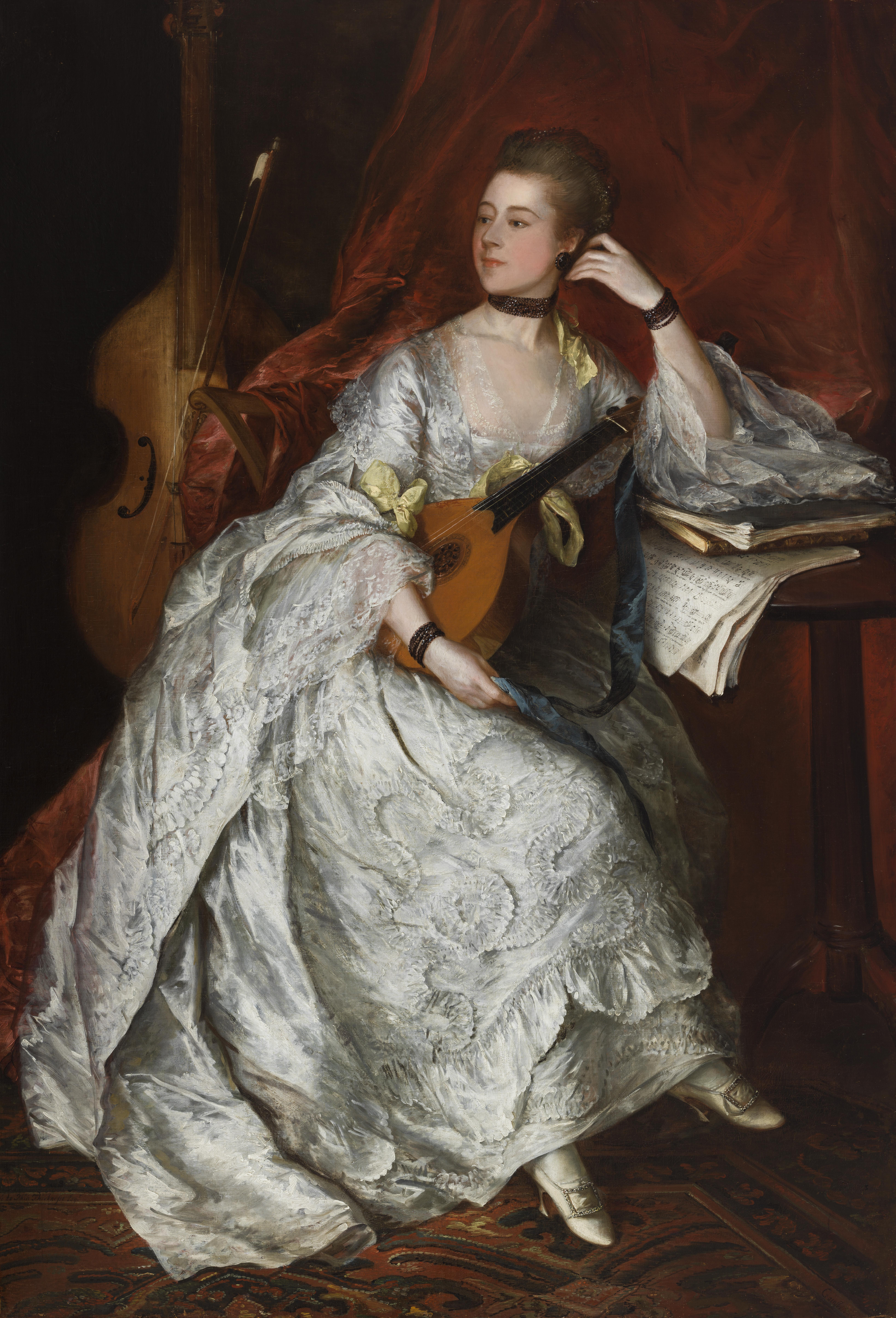
Portrait of Ann Ford, 1760, Cincinnati Art Museum

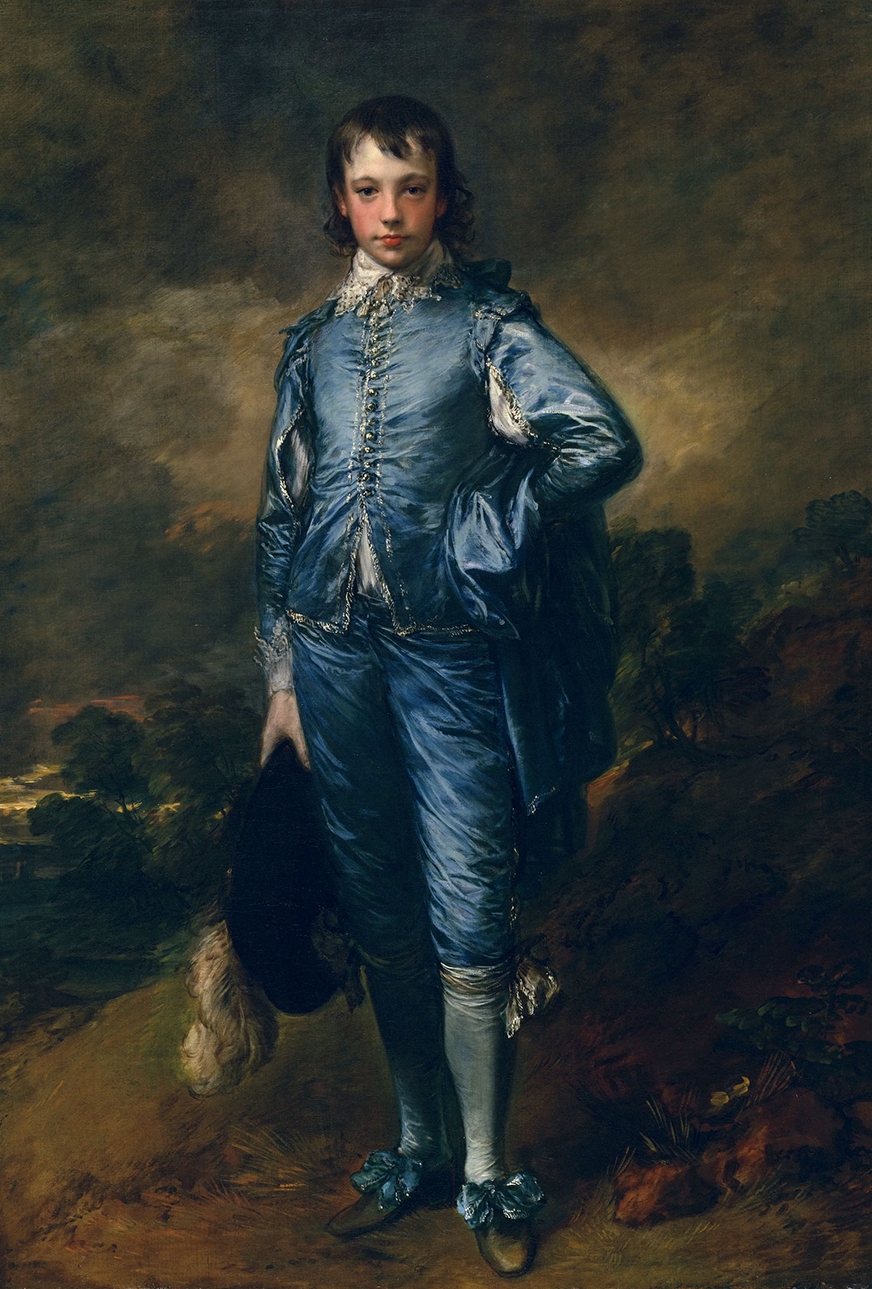
The Blue Boy (1770). Huntington Library, San Marino, California

In 1759, Gainsborough and his family moved to Bath, living at number 17 The Circus. There, he studied portraits by van Dyck and was eventually able to attract a fashionable clientele. Beginning with the Exhibition of 1761 he sent work to the annual exhibition of the Society of Artists of Great Britain (of which he was one of the earliest members) at Spring Gardens in London. From 1769 he submitted works to the Royal Academy's annual exhibitions. The exhibitions helped him enhance his reputation, and he was invited to become a founding member of the Royal Academy in 1769. His relationship with the academy was not an easy one and he stopped exhibiting his paintings in 1773.

Despite Gainsborough's increasing popularity and success in painting portraits for fashionable society, he expressed frustration during his Bath period at the demands of such work and that it prevented him from pursuing his preferred artistic interests. In a letter to a friend in the 1760s Gainsborough wrote: "I'm sick of Portraits and wish very much to take my Viol da Gamba and walk off to some sweet Village where I can paint Landskips [landscapes] and enjoy the fag End of Life in quietness and ease". Of the men he had to deal with as patrons and admirers, and their pretensions, he wrote:

... damn Gentlemen, there is not such a set of Enemies to a real artist in the world as they are, if not kept at a proper distance. They think ... that they reward your merit by their Company & notice; but I ... know that they have but one part worth looking at, and that is their Purse; their Hearts are seldom near enough the right place to get a sight of it.

Gainsborough was so keen a viol da gamba player that he had at this stage five of the instruments, three made by Henry Jaye and two by Barak Norman.

=== London ===
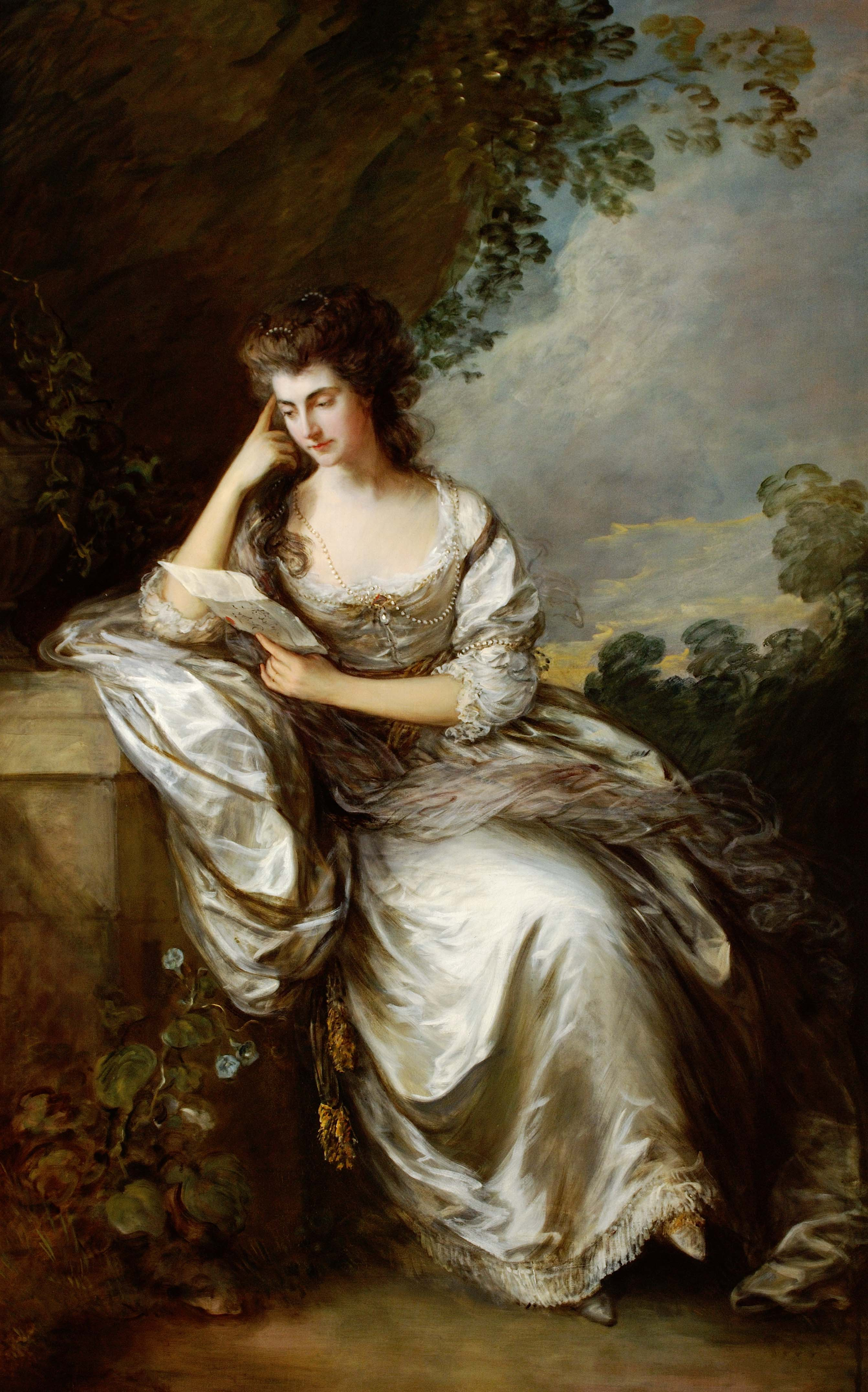
Frances Browne, Mrs John Douglas (1746–1811), 1783–84, Waddesdon Manor

In 1774, Gainsborough and his family moved to London to live in Schomberg House, Pall Mall. A commemorative blue plaque was put on the house in 1951. In 1777, he again began to exhibit his paintings at the Royal Academy, including portraits of contemporary celebrities, such as the Duke and Duchess of Cumberland. Exhibitions of his work continued for the next six years. About this time, Gainsborough began experimenting with printmaking using the then-novel techniques of aquatint and soft-ground etching.

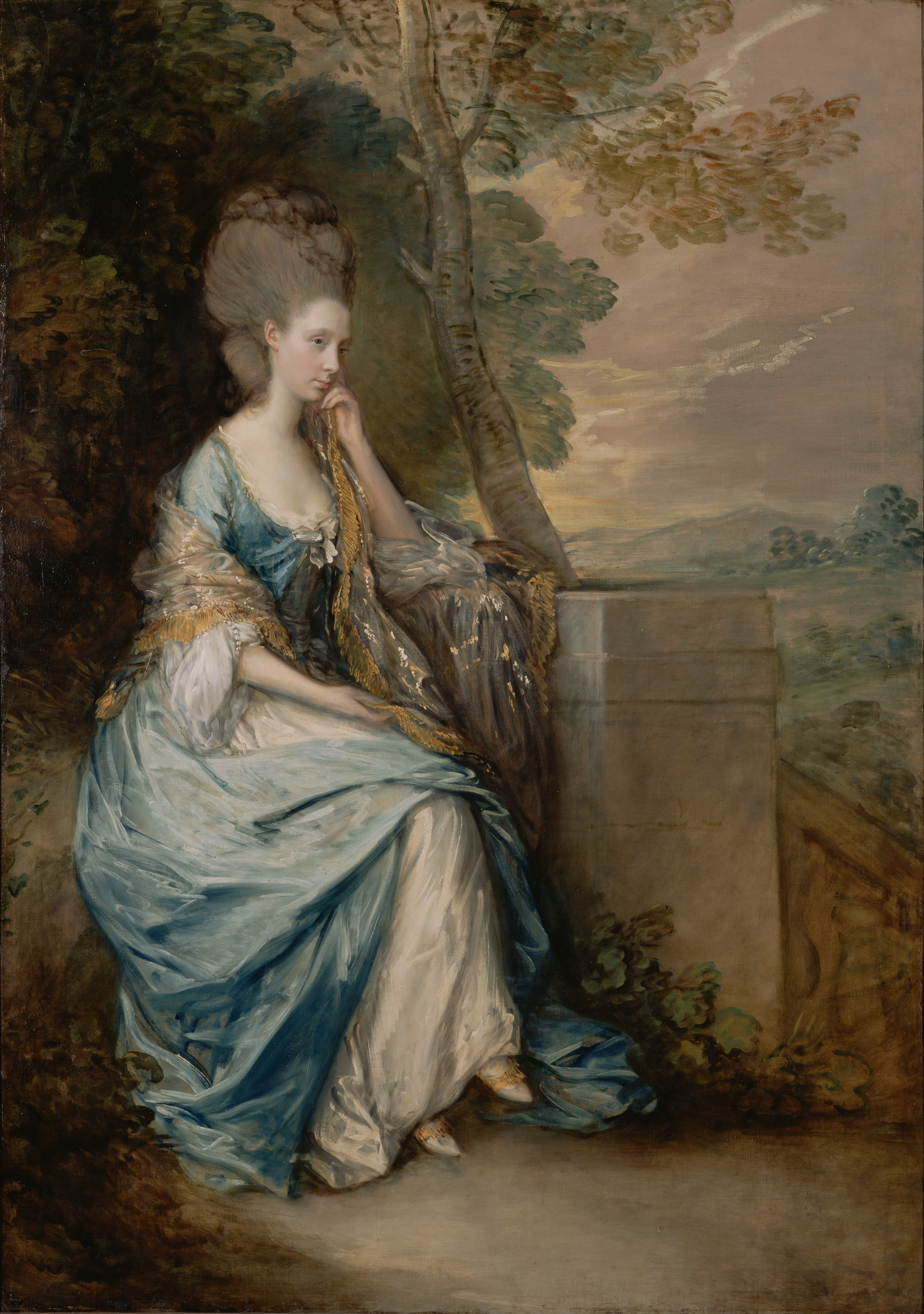
Portrait of Anne, Countess of Chesterfield (1777–78), J. Paul Getty Museum. His later pictures are characterised by a light palette and easy strokes.

During the 1770s and 1780s Gainsborough developed a type of portrait in which he integrated the sitter into the landscape. An example of this is his portrait of Frances Browne, Mrs John Douglas (1746–1811) which can be seen at Waddesdon Manor. The sitter has withdrawn to a secluded and overgrown corner of a garden to read a letter, her pose recalling the traditional representation of Melancholy. Gainsborough emphasised the relationship between Mrs Douglas and her environment by painting the clouds behind her and the drapery billowing across her lap with similar silvery violet tones and fluid brushstrokes. This portrait was included in his first private exhibition at Schomberg House in 1784.

In 1776, Gainsborough painted a portrait of Johann Christian Bach, the youngest son of Johann Sebastian Bach. Bach's former teacher Padre Martini of Bologna, Italy, was assembling a collection of portraits of musicians, and Bach asked Gainsborough to paint his portrait as part of this collection. The portrait now hangs in the National Portrait Gallery, London.

In 1780, he painted the portraits of King George III and Queen Charlotte and afterwards received other royal commissions. In February 1780, his daughter Molly was married to his musician friend Johann Christian Fischer, to Gainsborough's dismay, as he realized that Fischer was forming an attachment to Molly while carrying on flirtation with Peggy. The marriage between Molly and Fischer lasted only eight months, owing to their discord and Fischer's deceit.

In 1784, Principal Painter in Ordinary Allan Ramsay died and the King was obliged to give the job to Gainsborough's rival and Academy president, Joshua Reynolds. Gainsborough remained the royal family's favourite painter, however.

In his later years, Gainsborough often painted landscapes. With Richard Wilson, he was one of the originators of the eighteenth-century British landscape school; though simultaneously, in conjunction with Reynolds, he was the dominant British portraitist of the second half of the 18th century.

William Jackson in his contemporary essays said of him "to his intimate friends he was sincere and honest and that his heart was always alive to every feeling of honour and generosity". Gainsborough did not particularly enjoy reading but letters written to his friends were penned in such an exceptional conversational manner that the style could not be equalled. As a letter writer Henry Bate-Dudley said of him "a selection of his letters would offer the world as much originality and beauty as is ever traced in his paintings".

In the 1780s, Gainsborough used a device he called a "Showbox" to compose landscapes and display them backlit on glass. The original box is on display in the Victoria and Albert Museum with a reproduction transparency.

He died of cancer on 2 August 1788 at the age of 61. According to his daughter Peggy, his last words were "van Dyck". He is interred in the churchyard St Anne's Church, Kew, Surrey, (located on Kew Green). It was his express wish to be buried near his friend Joshua Kirby. Later his wife and nephew Gainsborough Dupont were interred with him. Coincidentally Johan Zoffany and Franz Bauer are also buried in the graveyard. In 2011, an appeal was given to pay the costs of restoration of his tomb, and the tomb was restored in 2012. A street in Kew, Gainsborough Road, is named after him.

== Technique ==
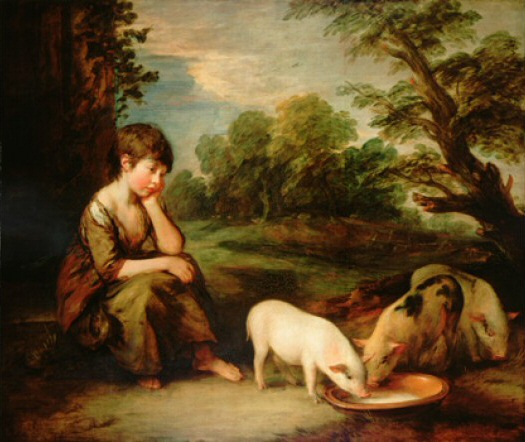
Girl with Pigs, 1781–82, private collection, was said by Sir Joshua Reynolds to be "the best picture he ever painted".

The art historian Michael Rosenthal described Gainsborough as "one of the most technically proficient and, at the same time, most experimental artists of his time". He was noted for the speed with which he applied paint, and he worked more from observations of nature (and of human nature) than from application of formal academic rules. The poetic sensibility of his paintings caused John Constable to say, "On looking at them, we find tears in our eyes and know not what brings them."

Gainsborough's enthusiasm for landscapes is shown in the way he merged figures of the portraits with the scenes behind them. His landscapes were often painted at night by candlelight, using a tabletop arrangement of stones, pieces of mirrors, broccoli, and the like as a model. His later work was characterised by a light palette and easy, economical strokes.

Gainsborough's only known assistant was his nephew, Gainsborough Dupont.

== Reputation ==
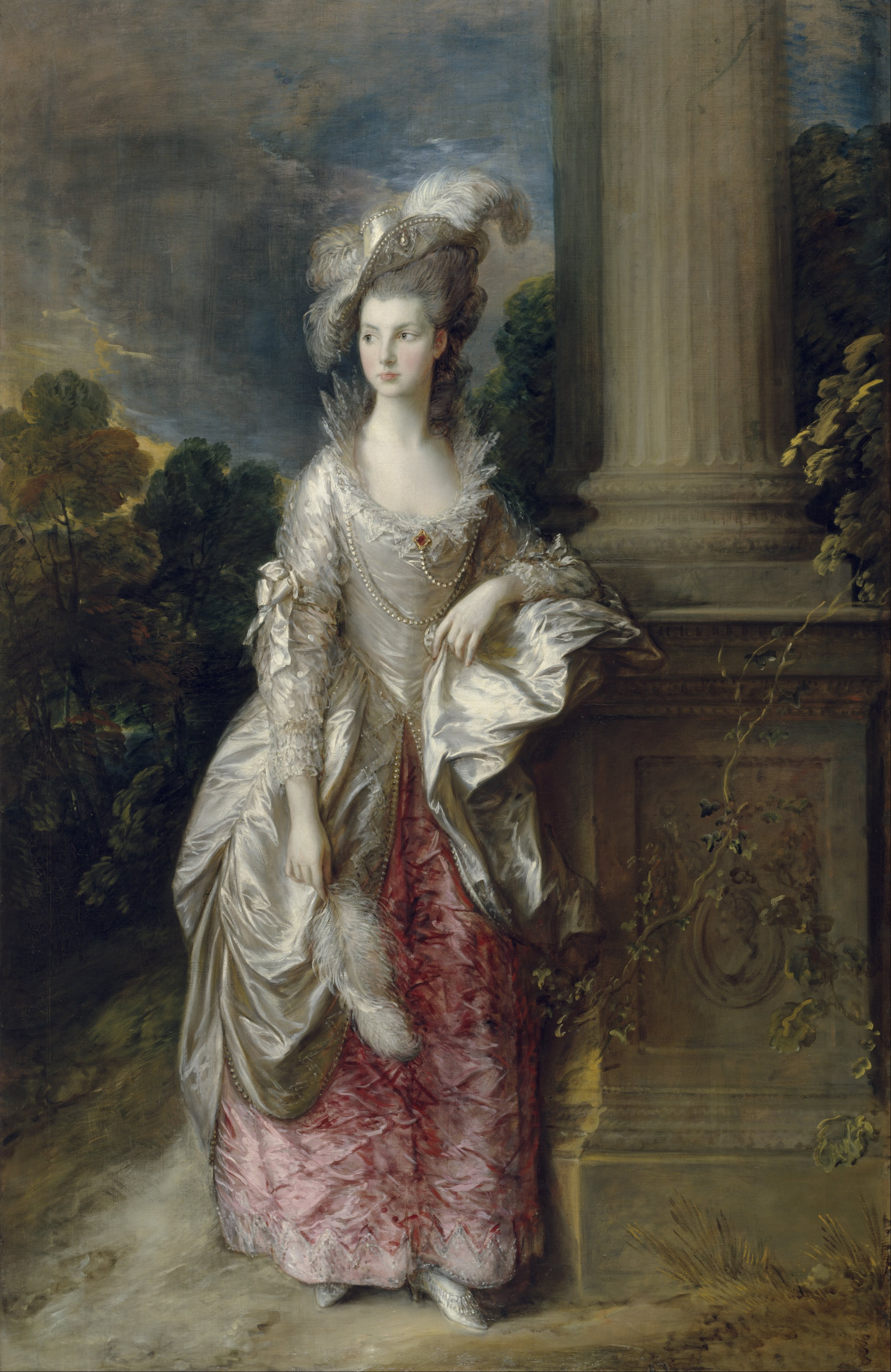
Portrait of Mrs Mary Graham (1777) Scottish National Gallery

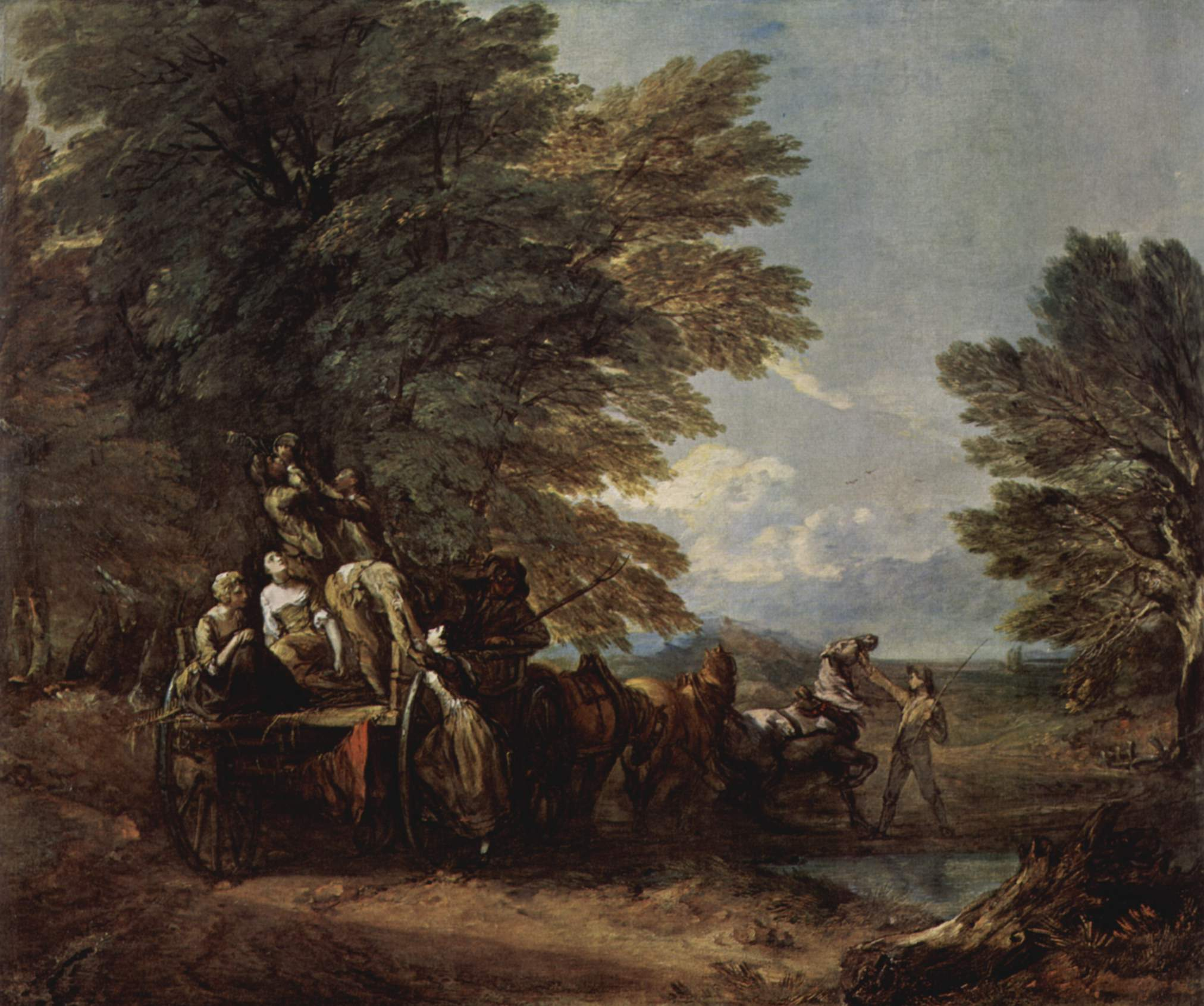
The Harvest Wagon (1767)

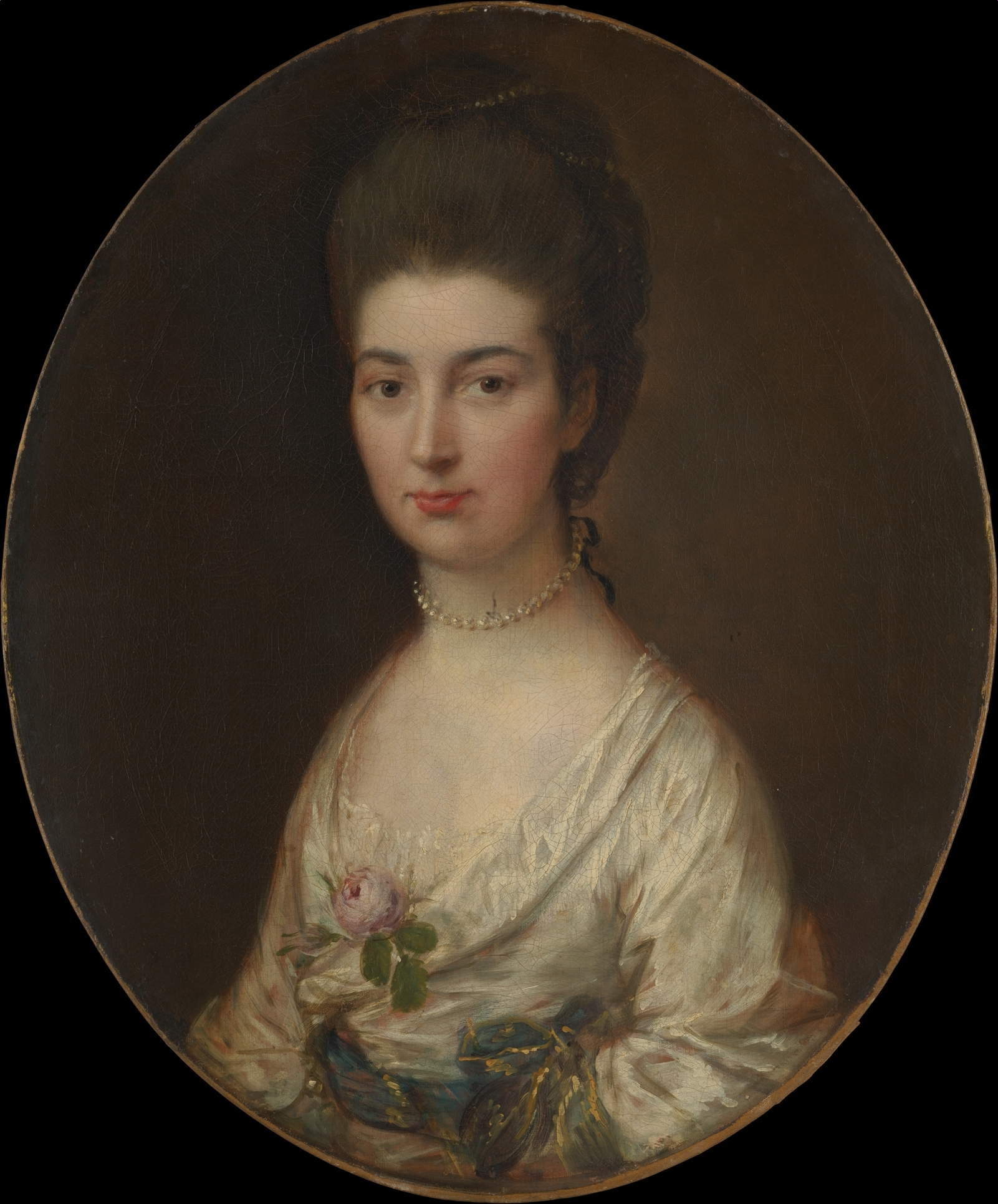
Alice De Lancey Izard (between 1747 and 1788) Metropolitan Museum of Art

His more famous works, The Blue Boy; Mr and Mrs Andrews; Portrait of Mrs Mary Graham; Mary and Margaret: The Painter's Daughters; William Hallett and His Wife Elizabeth, nee Stephen, known as The Morning Walk; and Cottage Girl with Dog and Pitcher, display the unique individuality of his subjects. His rival, Joshua Reynolds wrote that the painting Girl with Pigs was "the best picture he (Gainsborough) ever painted or perhaps ever will".

Gainsborough's works became popular with collectors from the 1850s on, after Lionel de Rothschild began buying his portraits. The rapid rise in the value of pictures by Gainsborough and also by Reynolds in the mid 19th century was partly because the Rothschild family, including Ferdinand de Rothschild began collecting them.

In 2011, Gainsborough's portrait of Miss Read (Mrs Frances Villebois) was sold by Michael Pearson, 4th Viscount Cowdray, for a record price of £6.54M, at Christie's in London. She was a matrilineal descendant of Cecily Neville, Duchess of York.

== Popular culture ==
- In the steampunk alternate history novel The Two Georges by Richard Dreyfuss and Harry Turtledove, the eponymous fictional Gainsborough painting serves as the macguffin.
- Gainsborough's portrait The Blue Boy is shown in the 1988 comedy movie The Naked Gun: From the Files of Police Squad! in the office of the antagonist, Vincent Ludwig.
- Gainsborough's The Blue Boy is also referenced in a 1995 episode of Keeping Up Appearances with Hyacinth Bucket stating at country house estate sale that she was "looking for something like Gainsborough's Blue Boy...only cheaper...".
- In the Star Trek: The Next Generation episode Hollow Pursuits (1990), Wesley Crusher dresses up as The Blue Boy.
- Cecil Beaton's play Gainsborough's Girls is set in London in 1774 when the painter moved his family to the capital. Previously unpublished, it received its first performance in Sudbury, Suffolk in 2019, followed by a short run at the Tower Theatre, London.
- Simon Edge's comic novel A Right Royal Face-Off focuses on Gainsborough's relationship with King George III and his family, and his rivalry with Joshua Reynolds.
- Stanley Kubrick was inspired by Gainsborough's paintings, amongst other artists of the 18th century, in creating the look and mannerisms for his 1975 film Barry Lyndon.
- Gainsborough's portrait The Morning Walk (Portrait of Mr and Mrs William Hallett) is clearly visible over actor Daniel Craig's shoulder during a scene in the 2012 James Bond film Skyfall set in the National Gallery.
- Gainsborough (played by Cecil Kellaway) performs a vital role in the 1945 film Kitty; saving the eponymous heroine from prison sets the plot, based on Pygmalion, in motion.
- Gainsborough's portrait The Gravenor Family was cut and pasted into the sleeve of the 1983 Electric Light Orchestra album Secret Messages.
- Gainsborough's portrait Cornard Wood, near Sudbury, Suffolk is referenced in the first season of the 2024 Netflix show The Gentlemen.
- The CSS extended color Gainsboro (hex value #DCDCDC) is attributed to Gainsborough's use of similar light tones.

== Gallery ==
Portraits

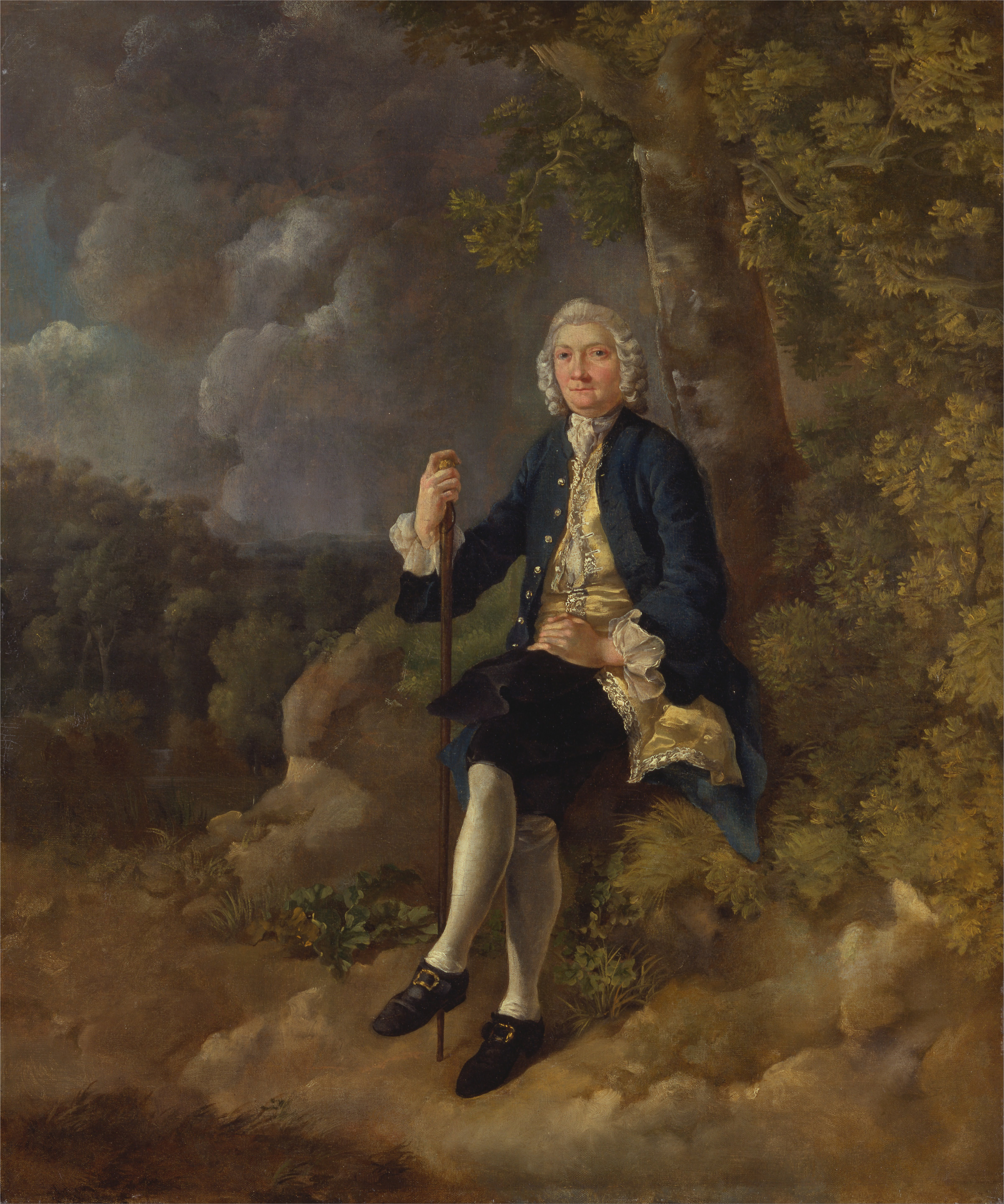
Clayton Jones (1745), Yale Center for British Art

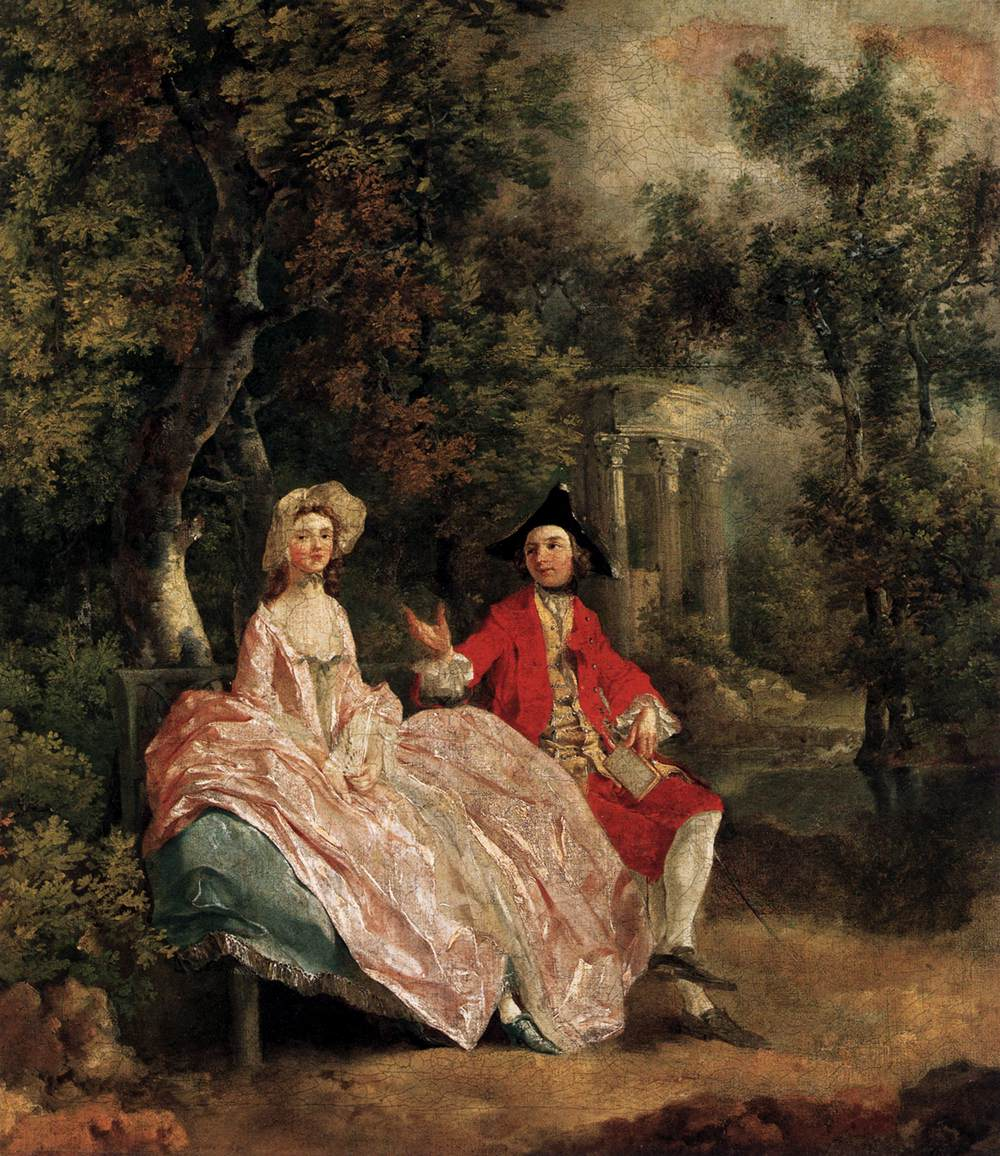
Conversation in a Park (1746), Louvre

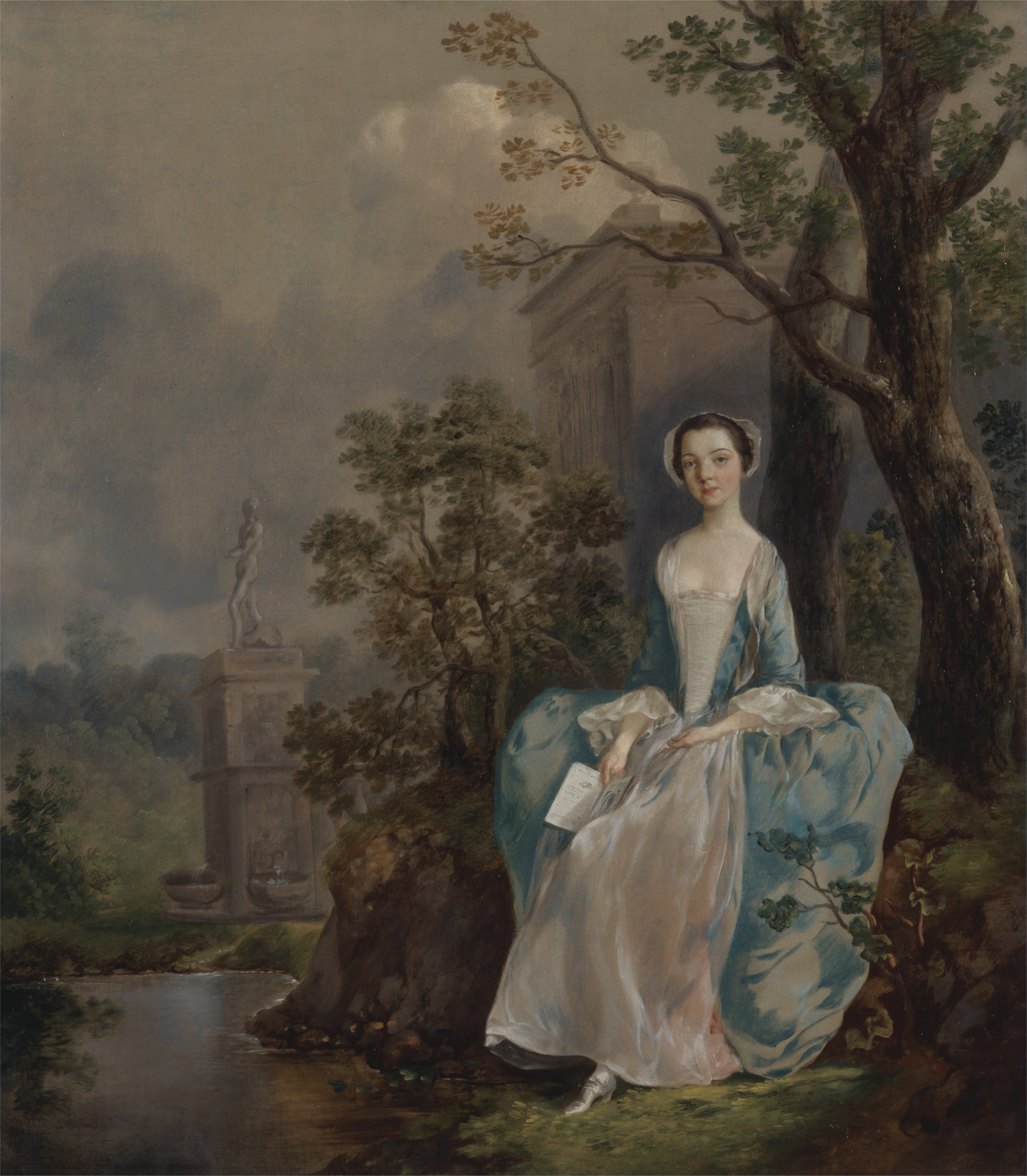
Portrait of a Woman (1750), Yale Center for British Art

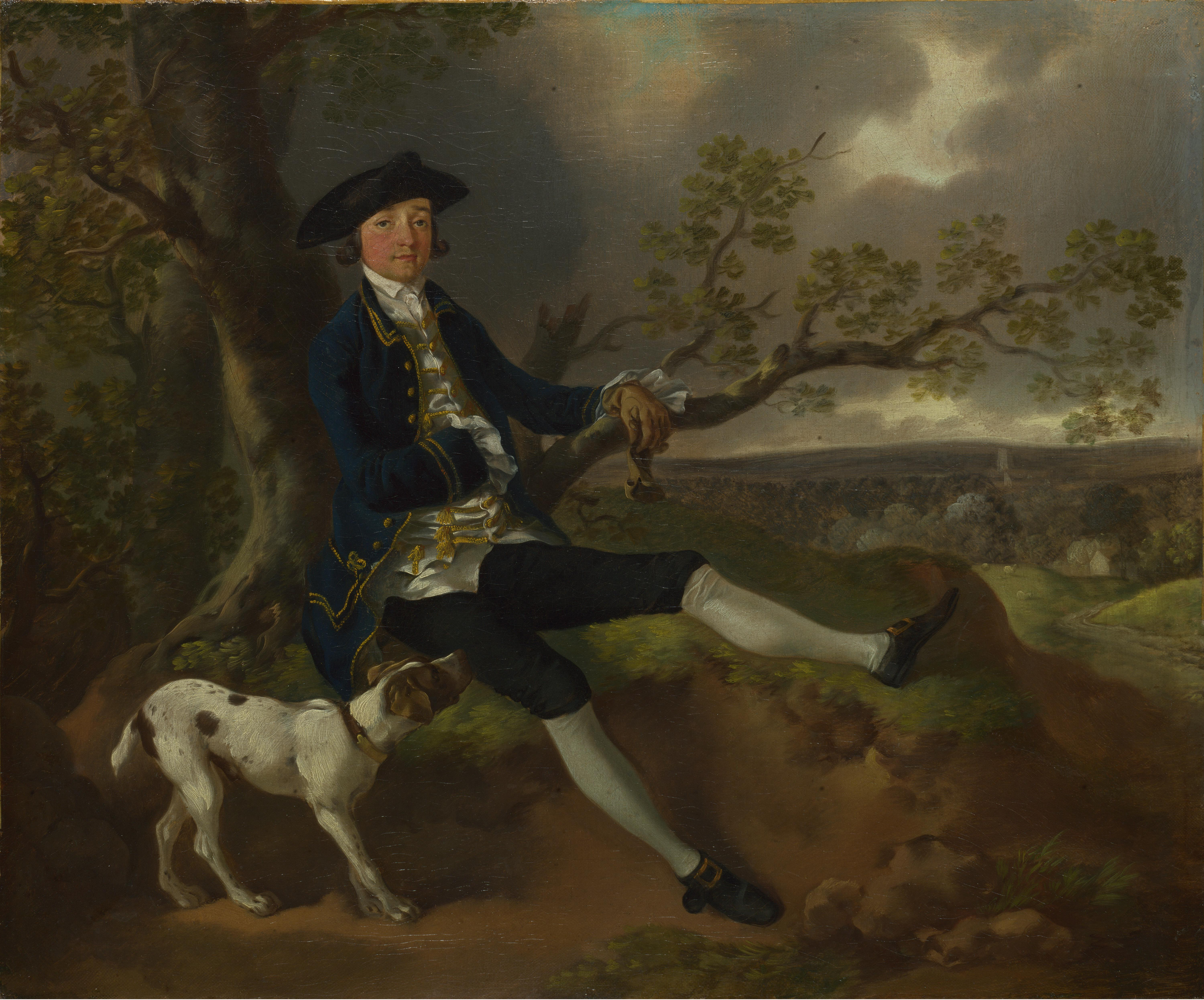
Portrait of John Plampin (1752), National Gallery

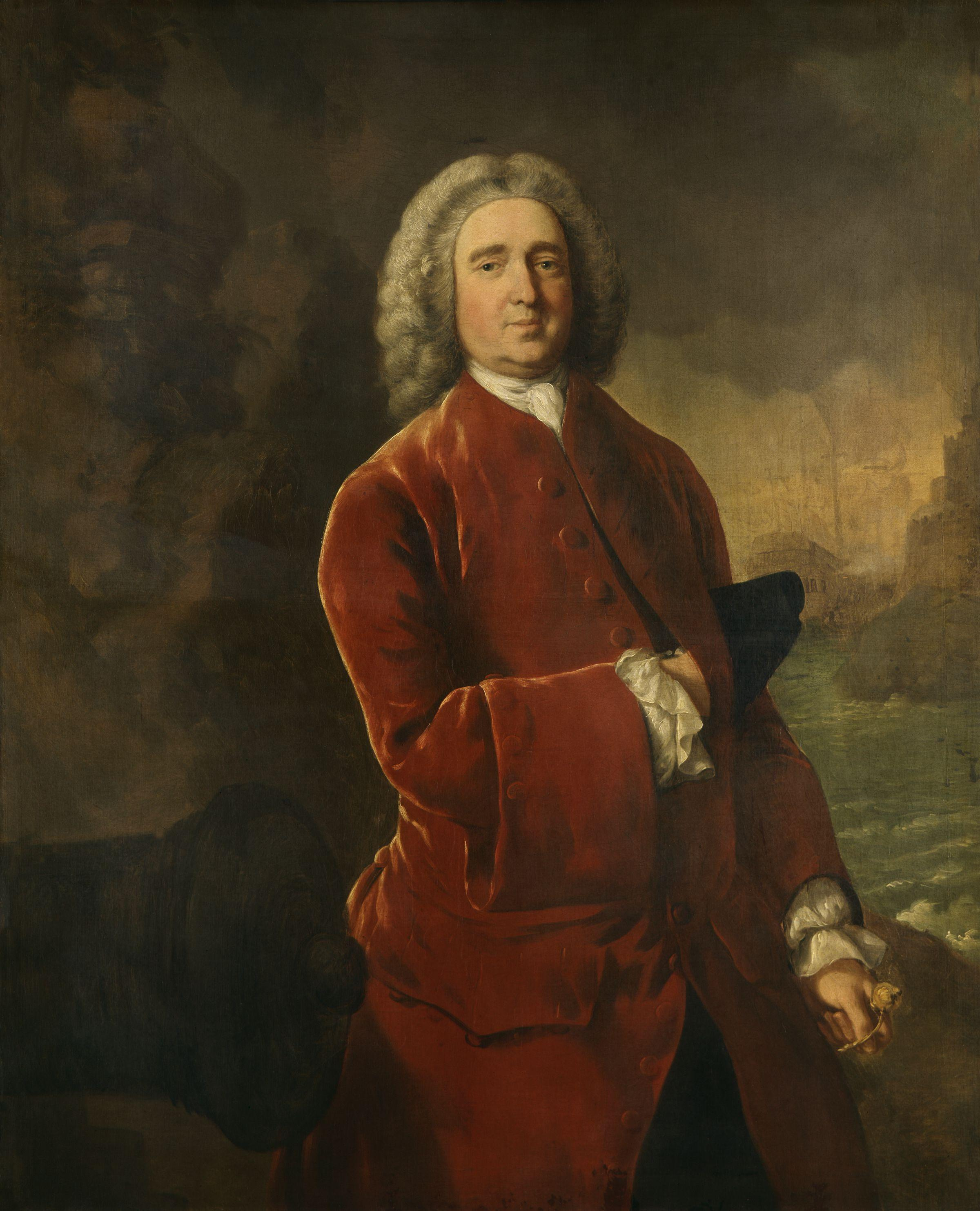
Portrait of Edward Vernon (1753), National Portrait Gallery

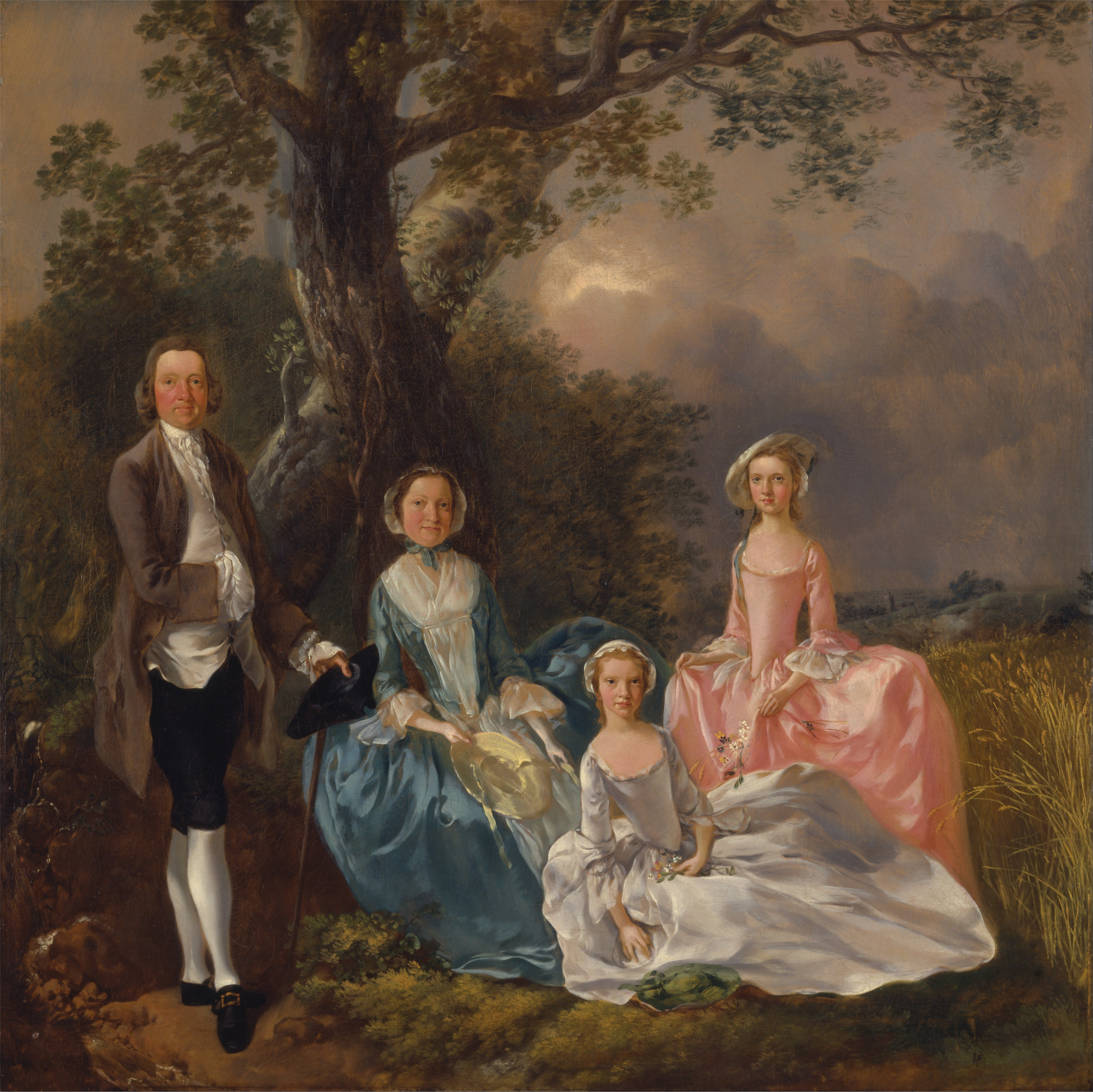
The Gravenor Family (1754), Yale Center for British Art

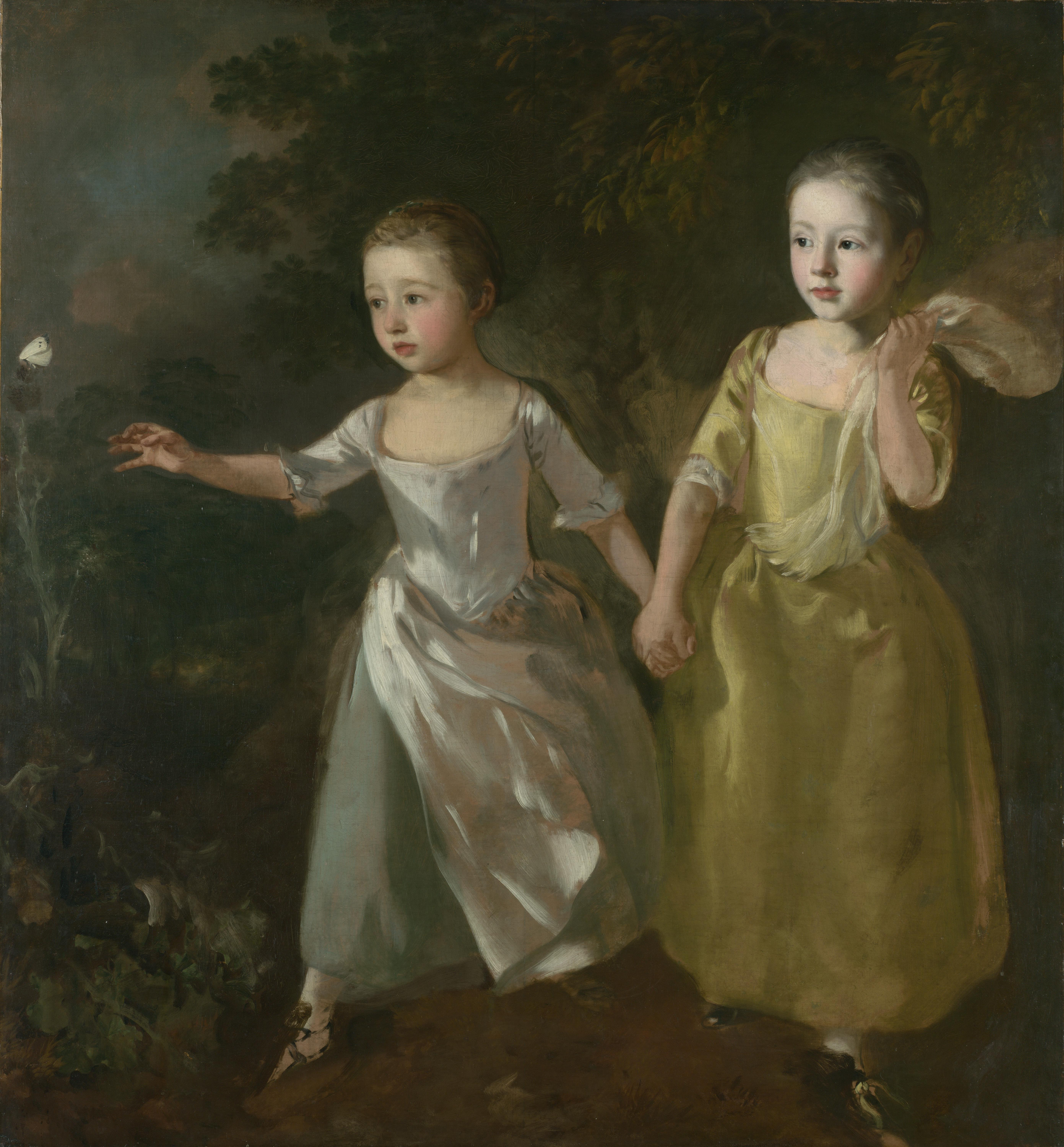
The Painter's Daughters Chasing a Butterfly (1756), National Gallery

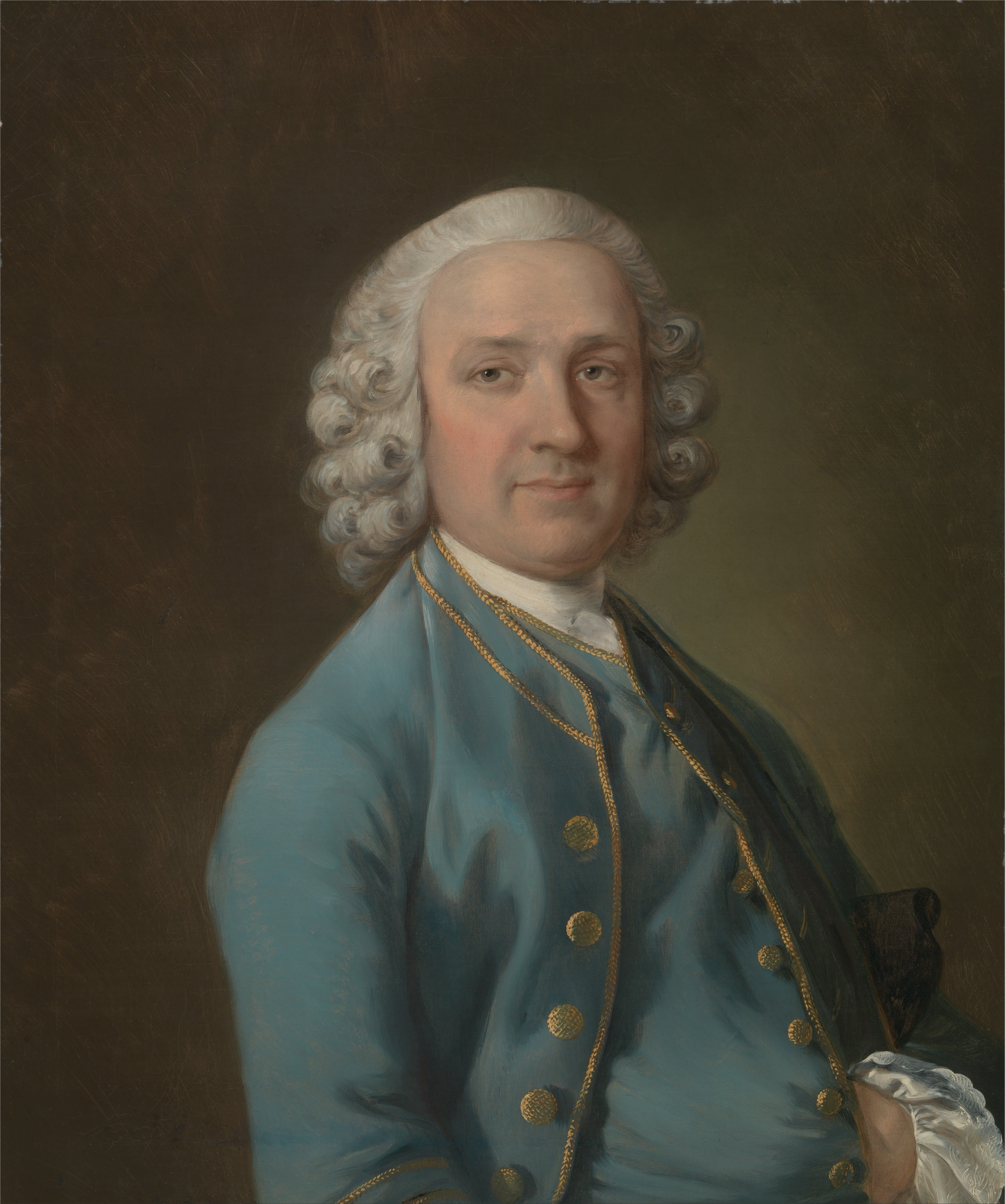
A Man Called Mr. Wood, the Dancing Master (1757), Yale Center for British Art

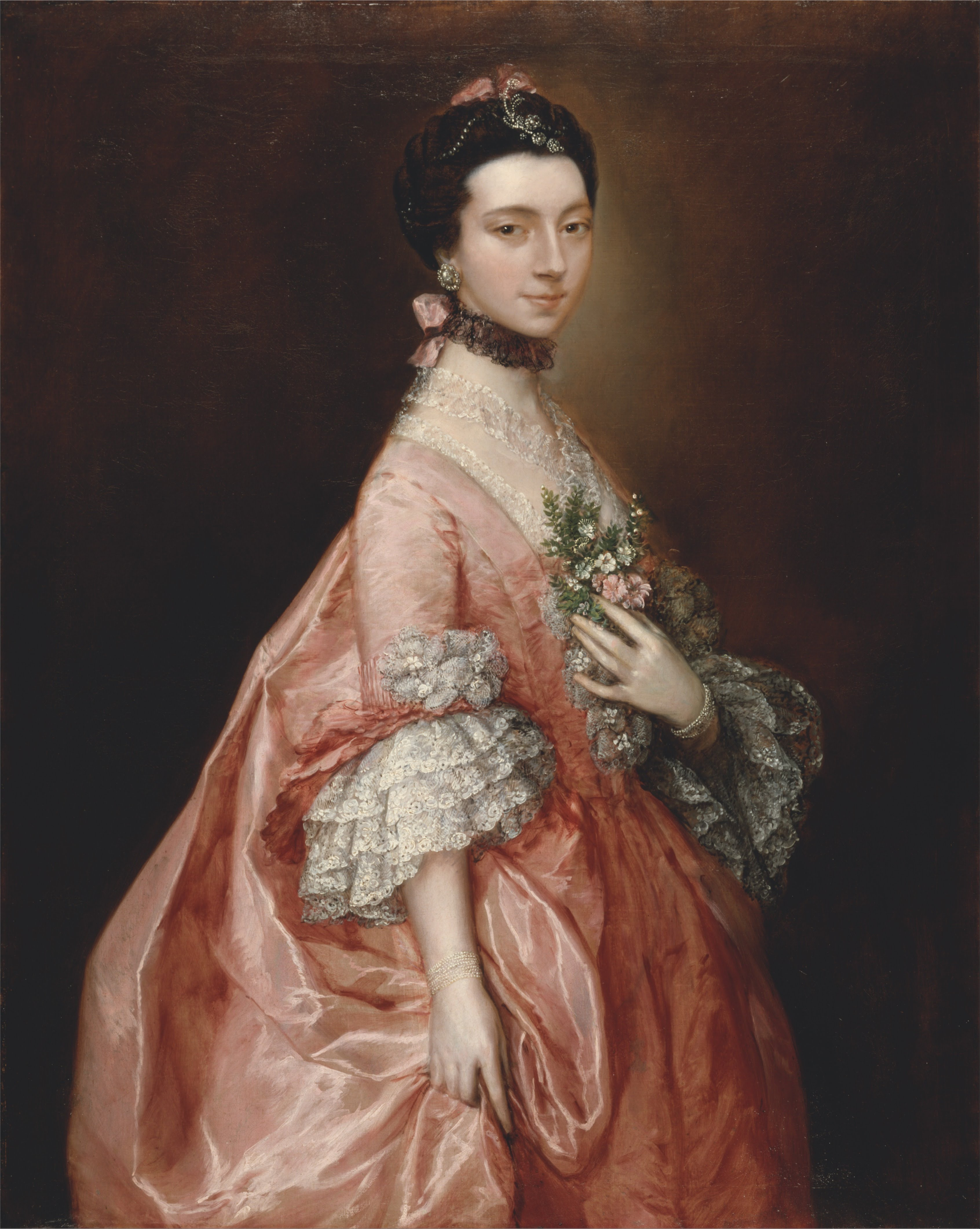
Mary Little, Later Lady Carr (c. 1763), Yale Center for British Art

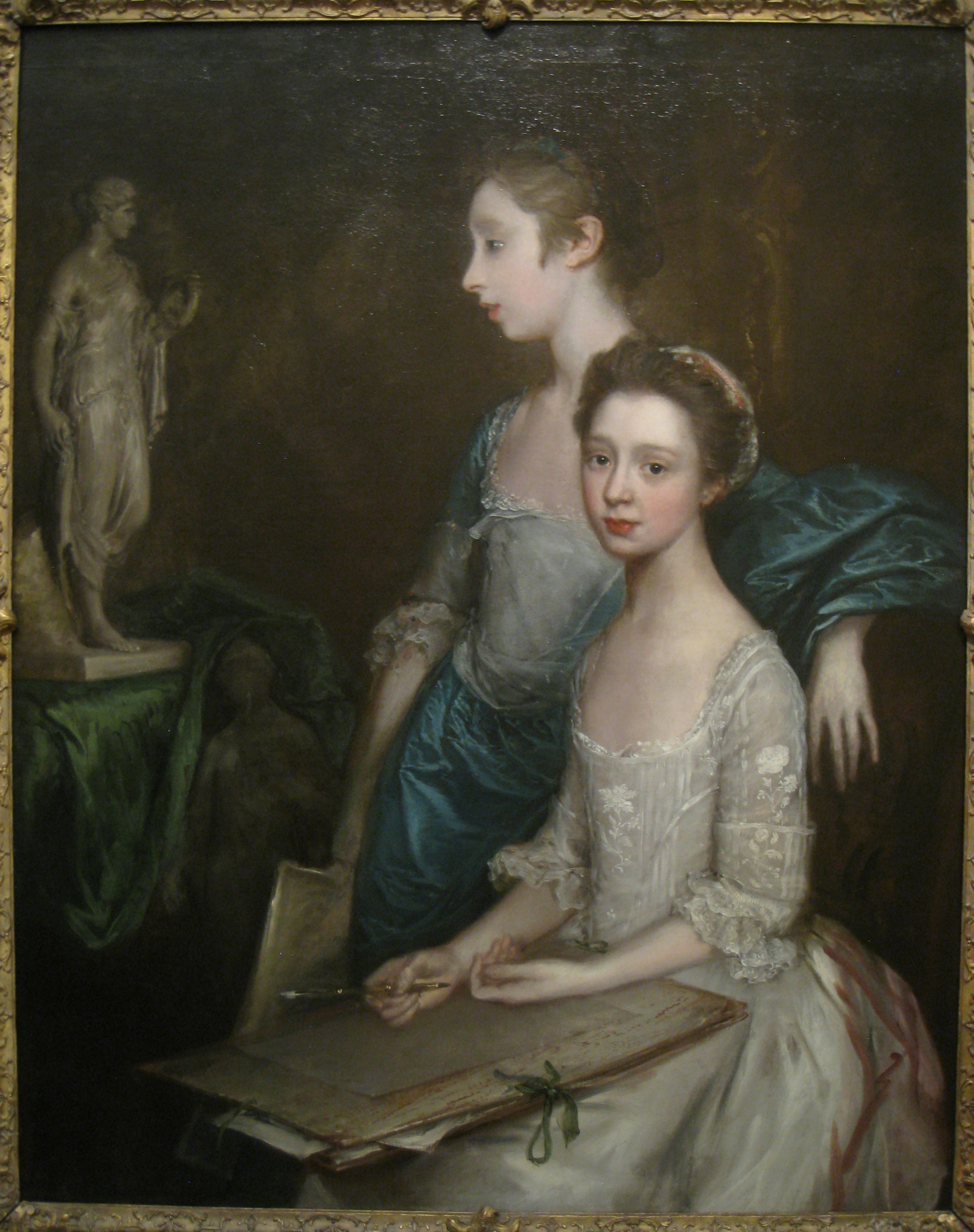
Portrait of the Artist's Daughters, 1763–64 Worcester Art Museum

Portrait of Richard Howe, (1763), Kenwood House

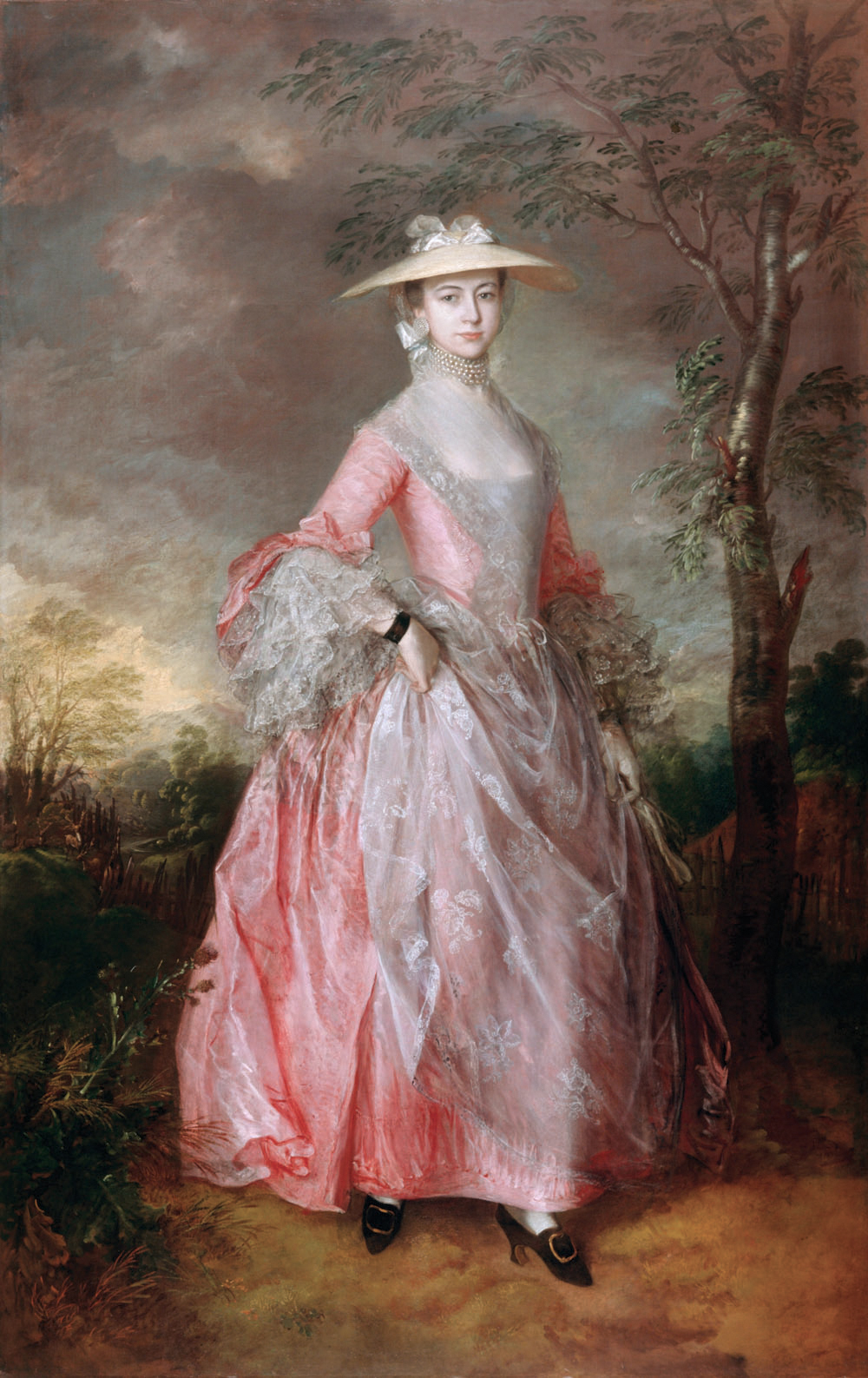
Portrait of Countess Howe, (1764), Kenwood House

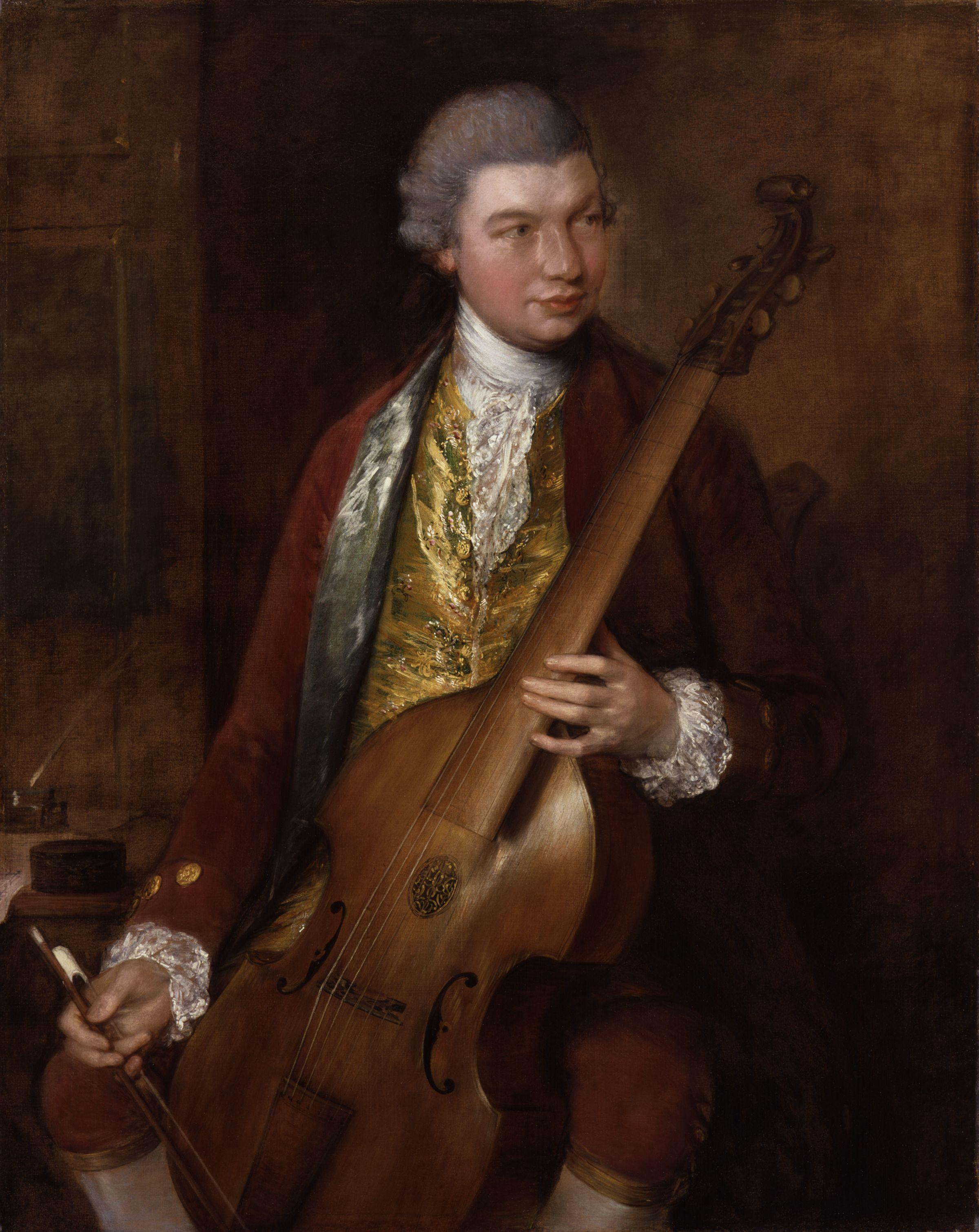
Portrait of the Composer Carl Friedrich Abel with his Viola da Gamba (c. 1765), National Portrait Gallery

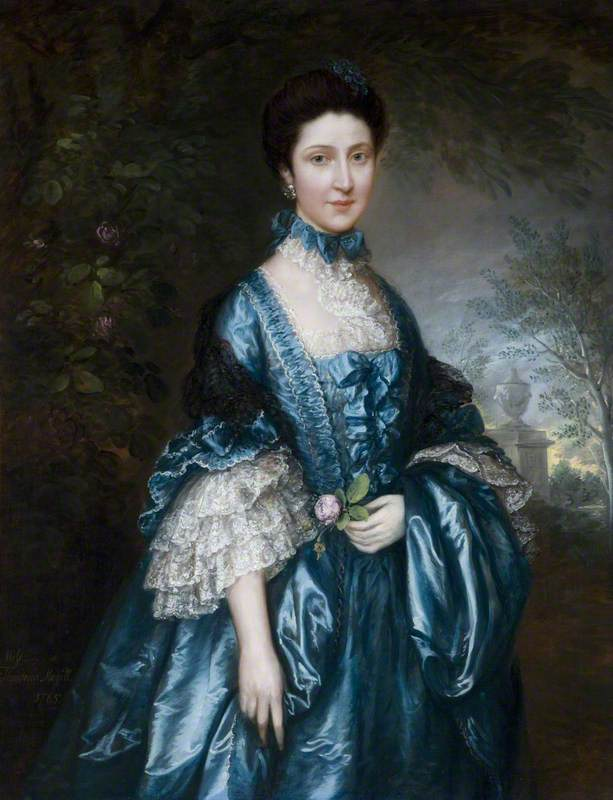
Theodosia Meade, Countess of Clanwilliam (Miss Hawkins-Magill), 1765

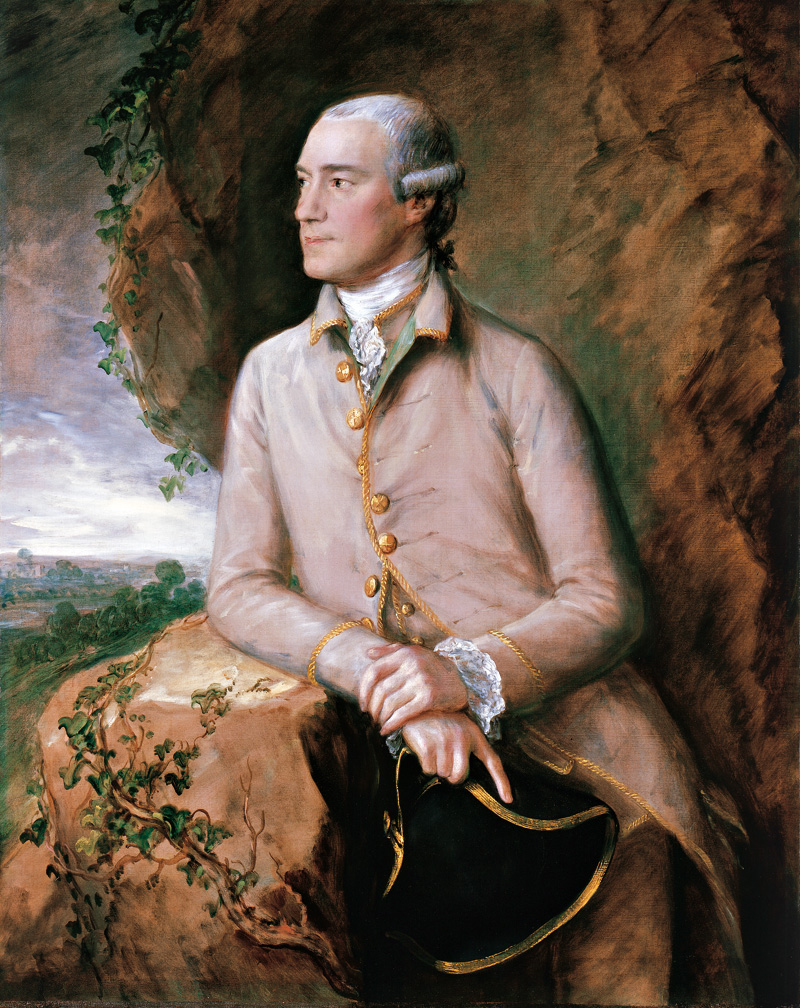
The lawyer Joshua Grigby III (1760/1765), Gemäldegalerie

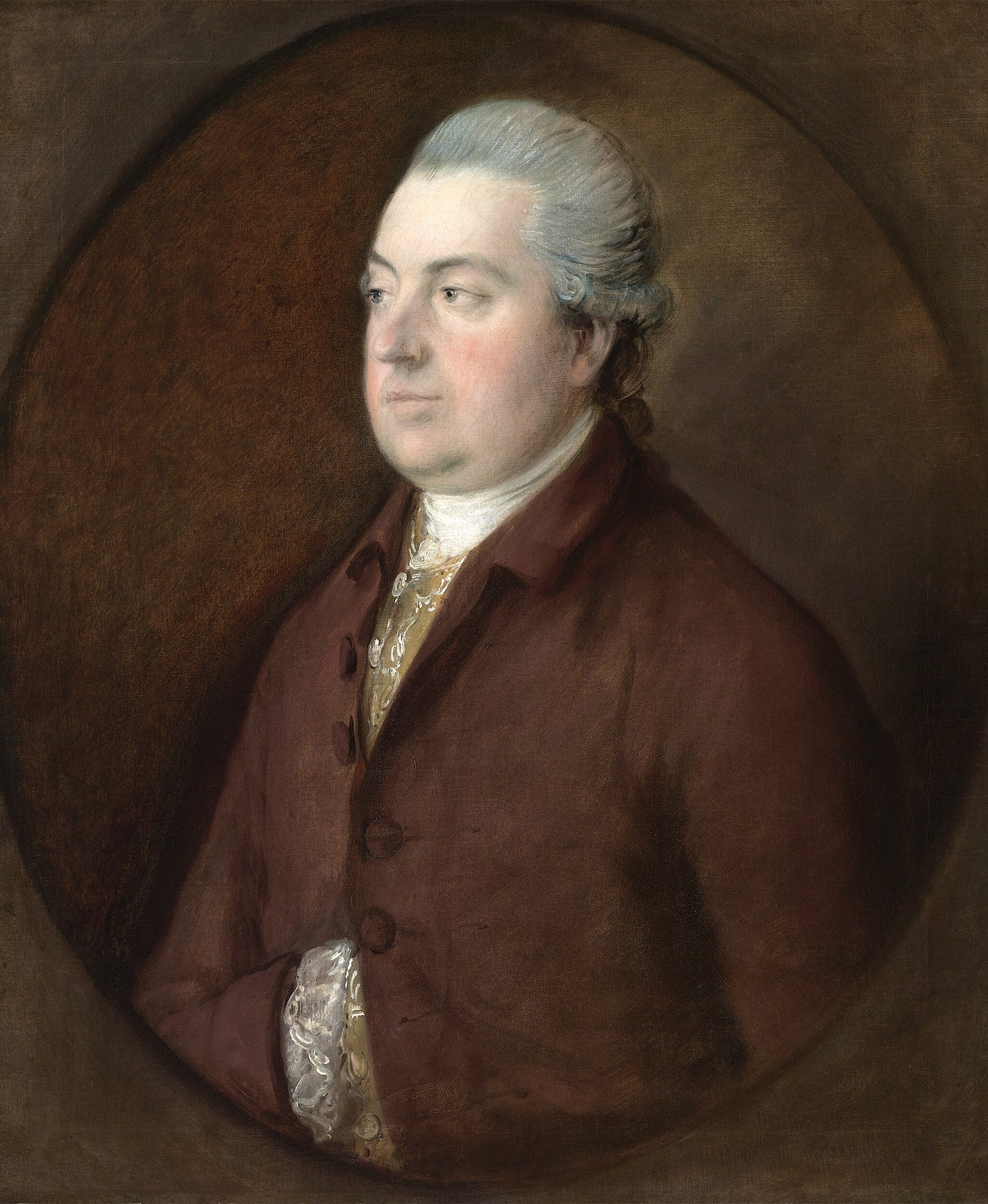
Portrait of Francis Bennett (1766), private collection

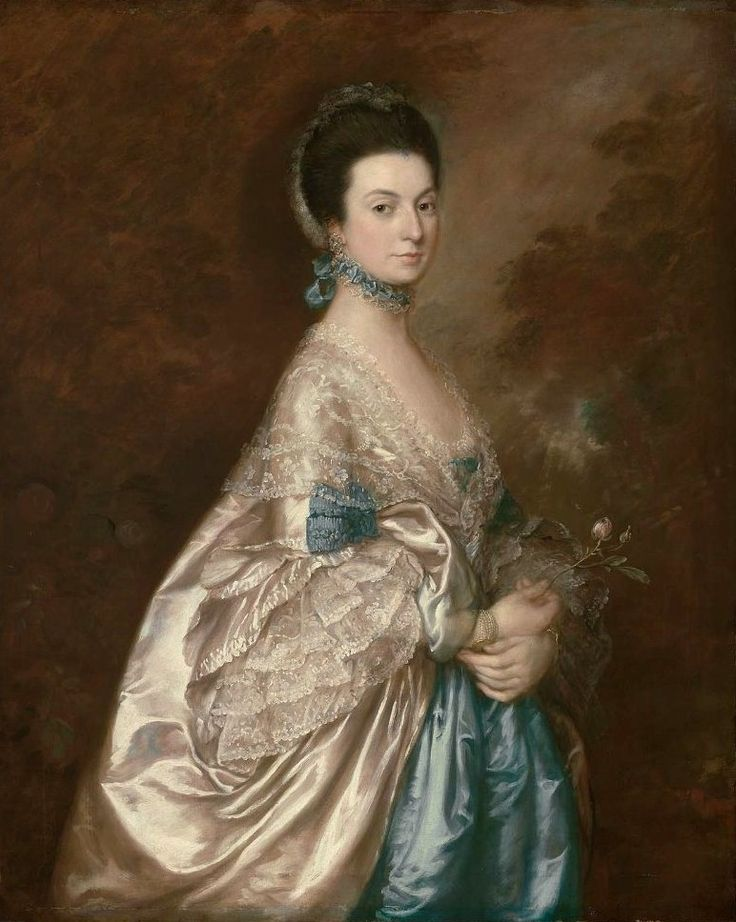
Mrs Edmund Morton Pleydell c. 1765

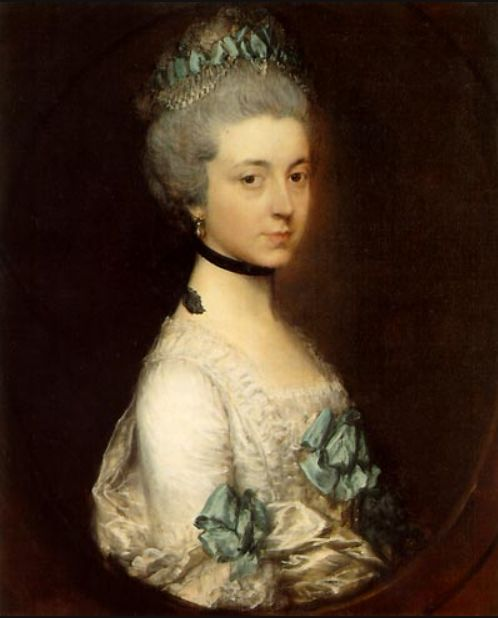
Lady Elizabeth Montagu, Duchess of Buccleuch and Queensberry (c. 1767), Boughton House

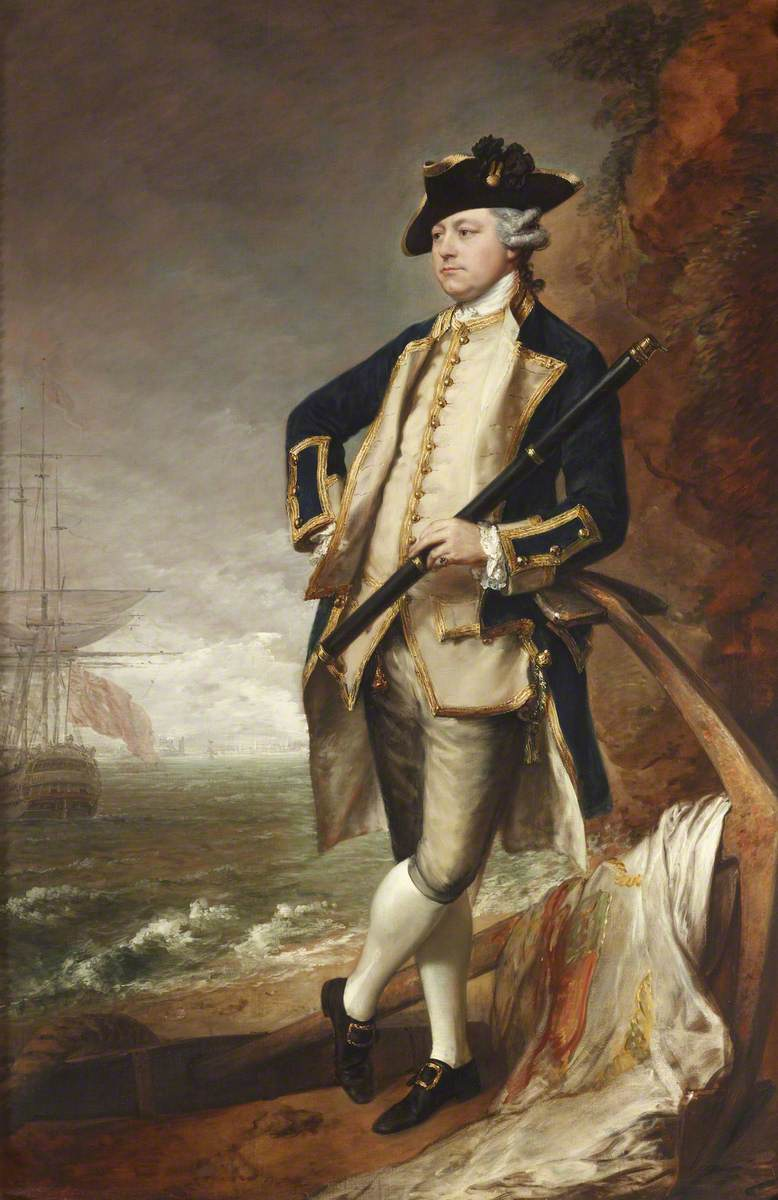
Portrait of Augustus Hervey (1767), Ickworth House

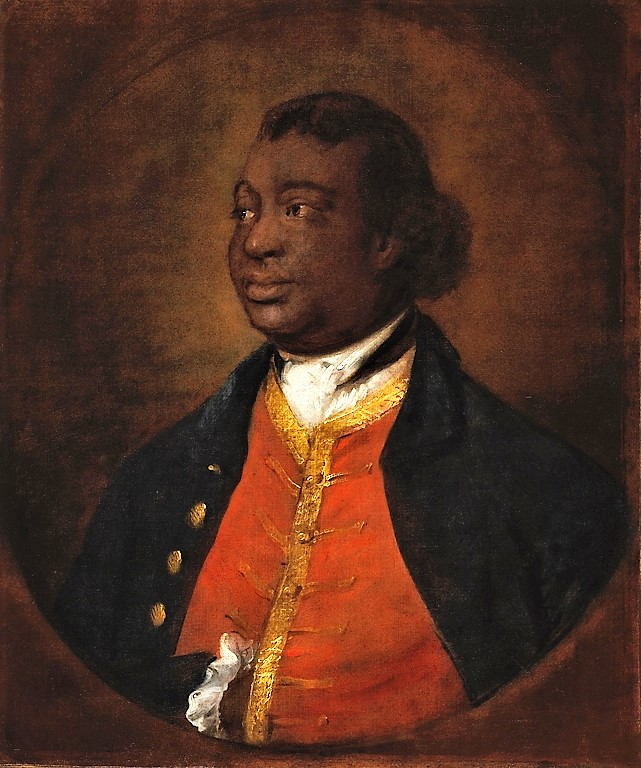
Portrait of Ignatius Sancho (1768), National Gallery of Canada

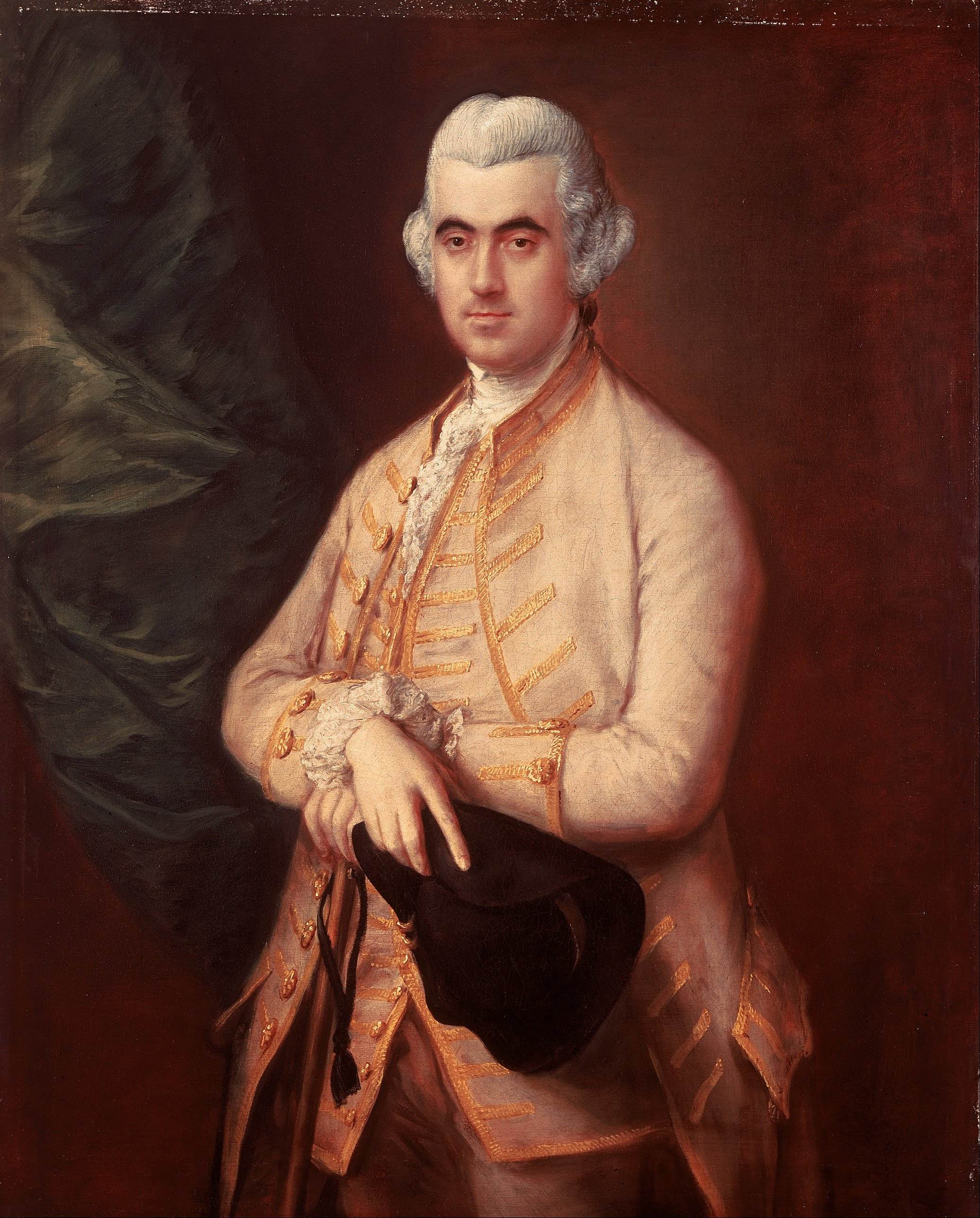
Sir Robert Clayton (1769), Walker Art Gallery

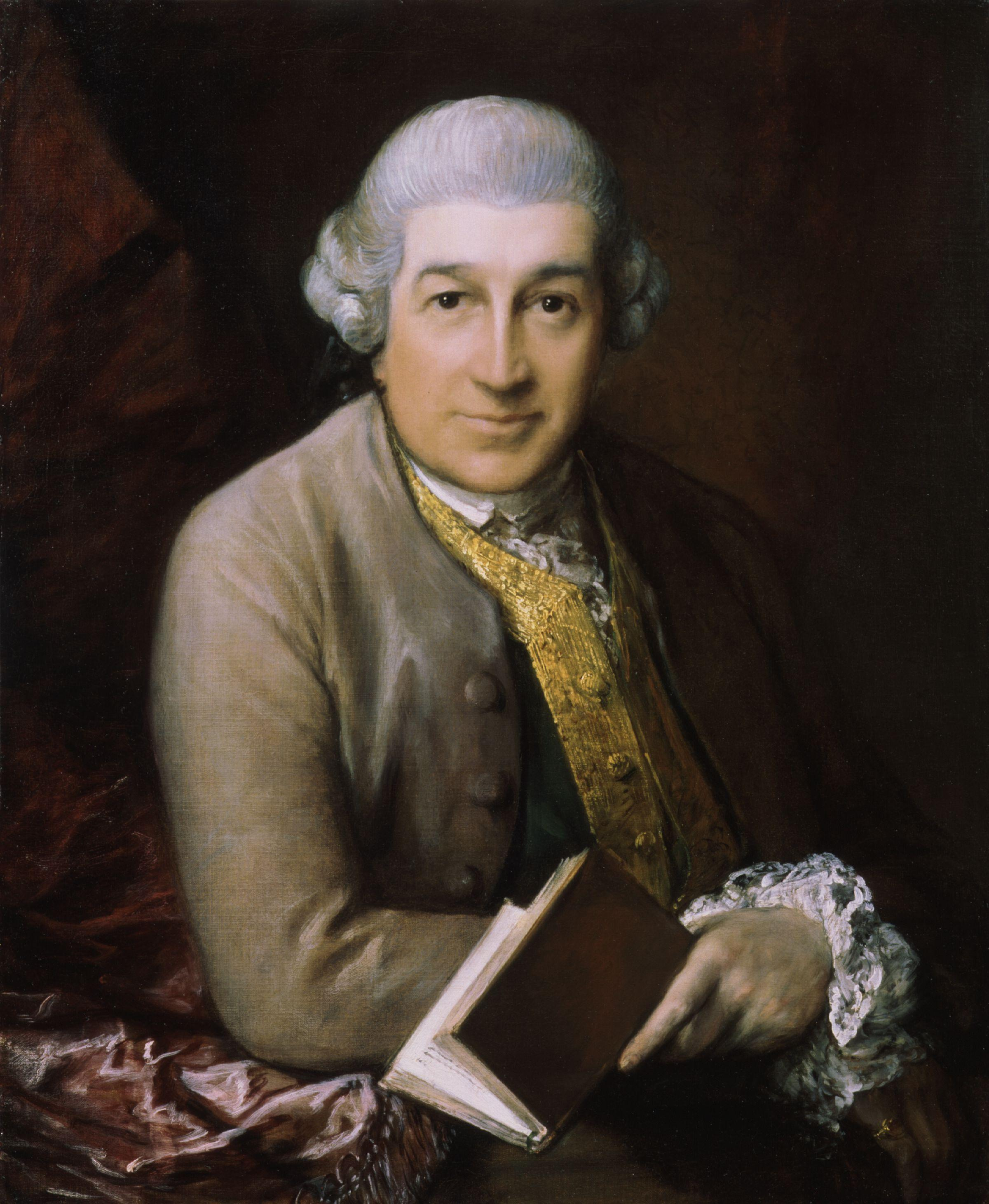
Portrait of David Garrick (1770), National Portrait Gallery, London

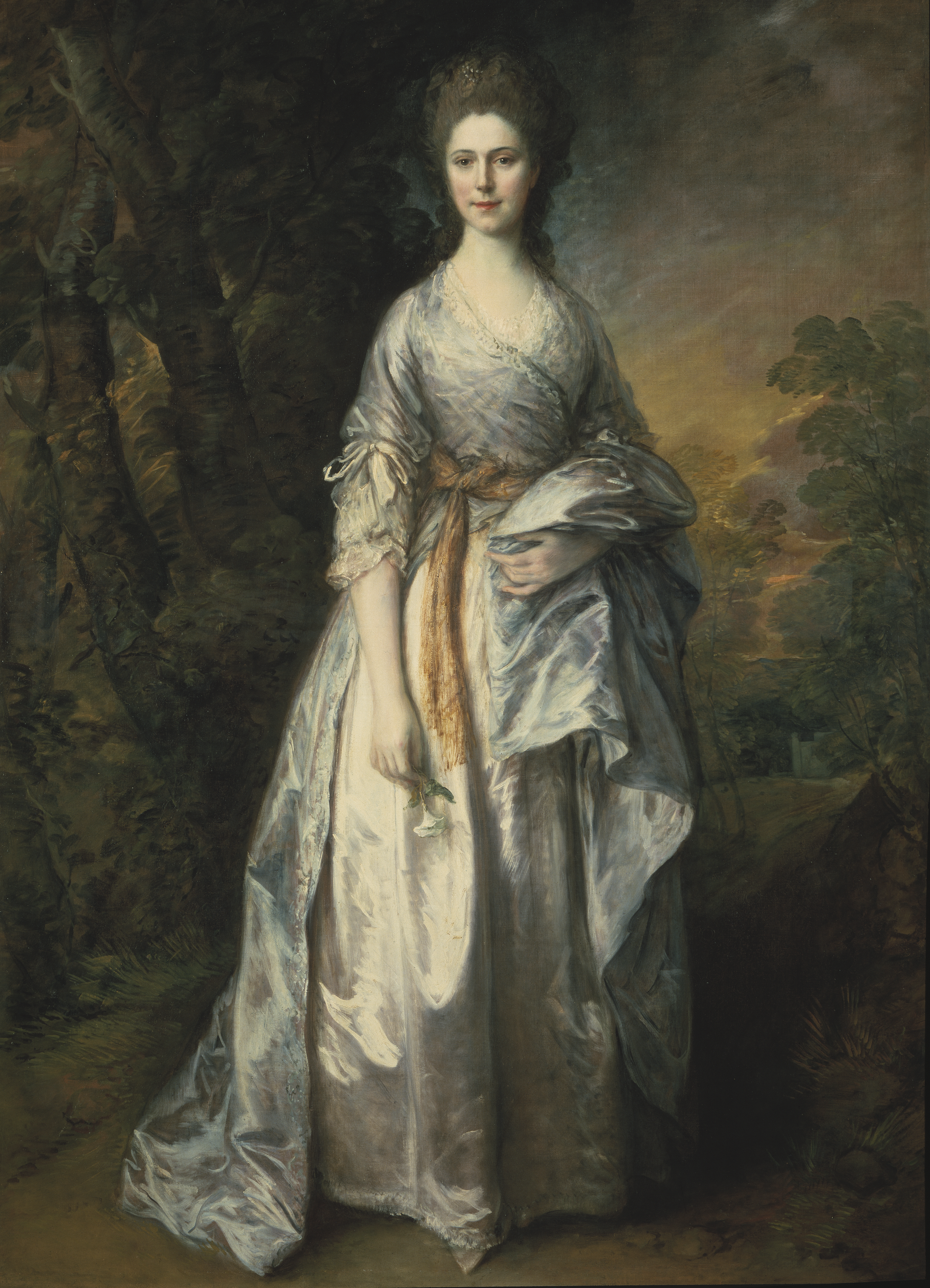
Maria, Lady Eardley (c. 1770) Nationalmuseum

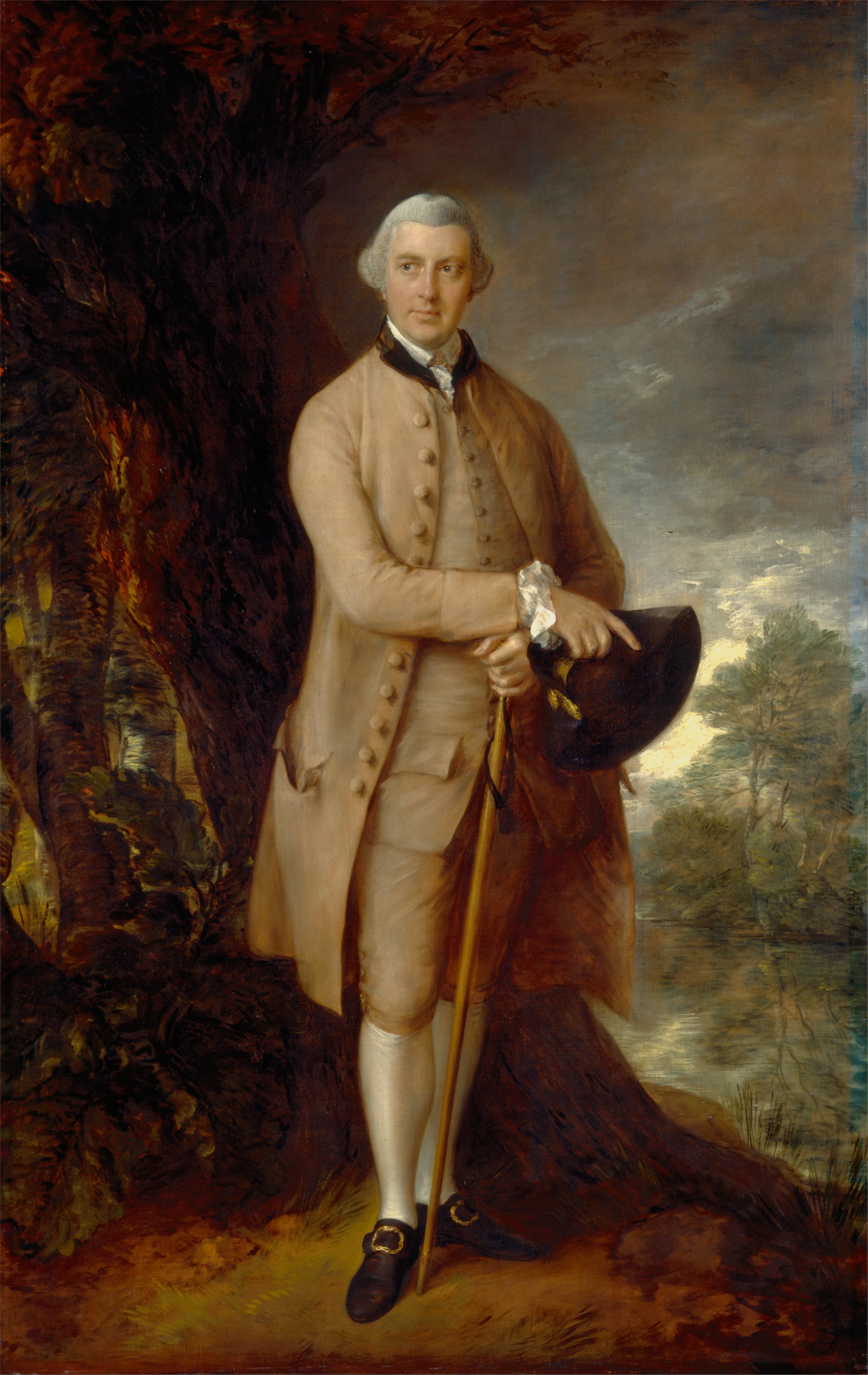
Portrait of Sir William Pulteney (1772), Yale Center for British Art

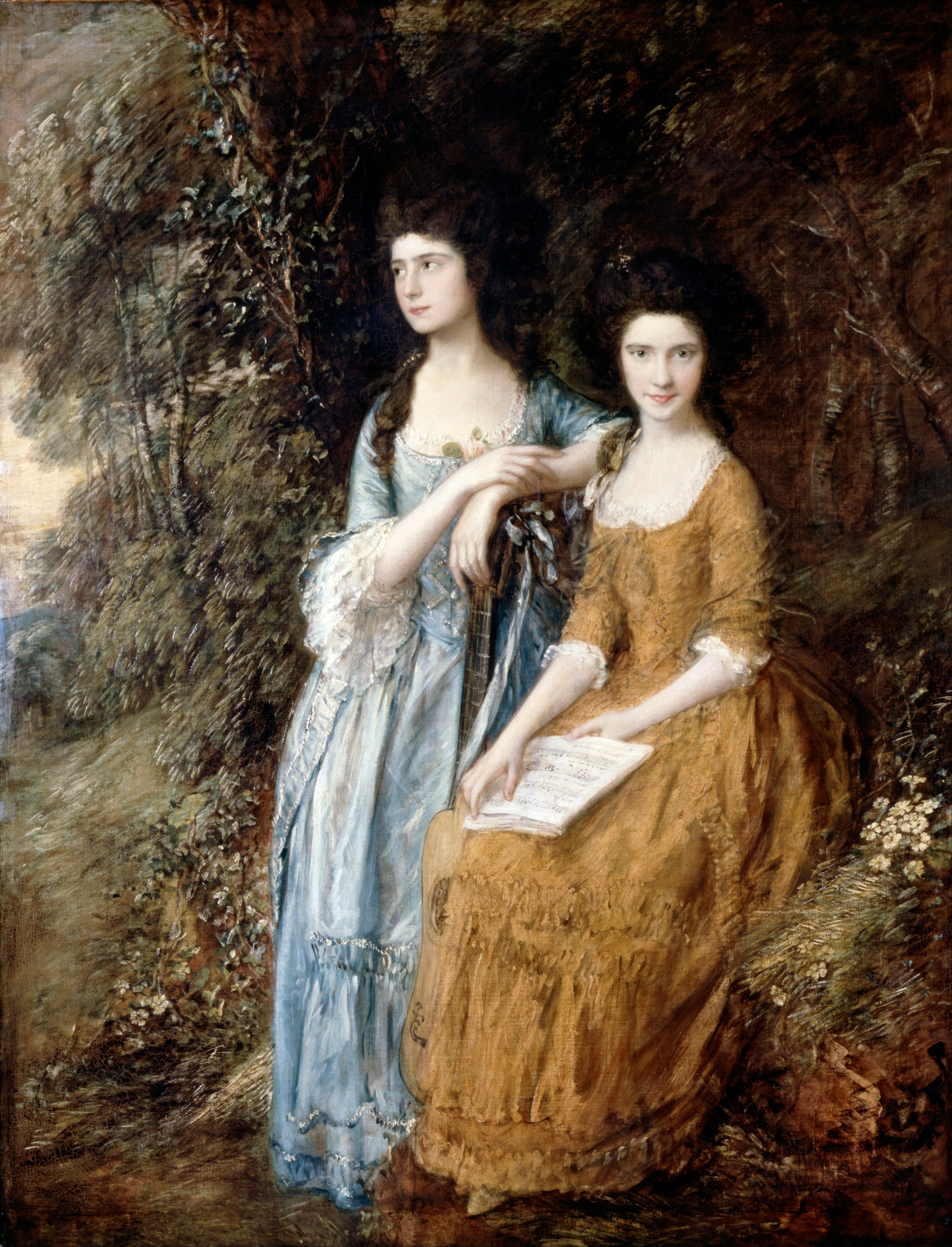
The Linley Sisters (1772), Dulwich Picture Gallery

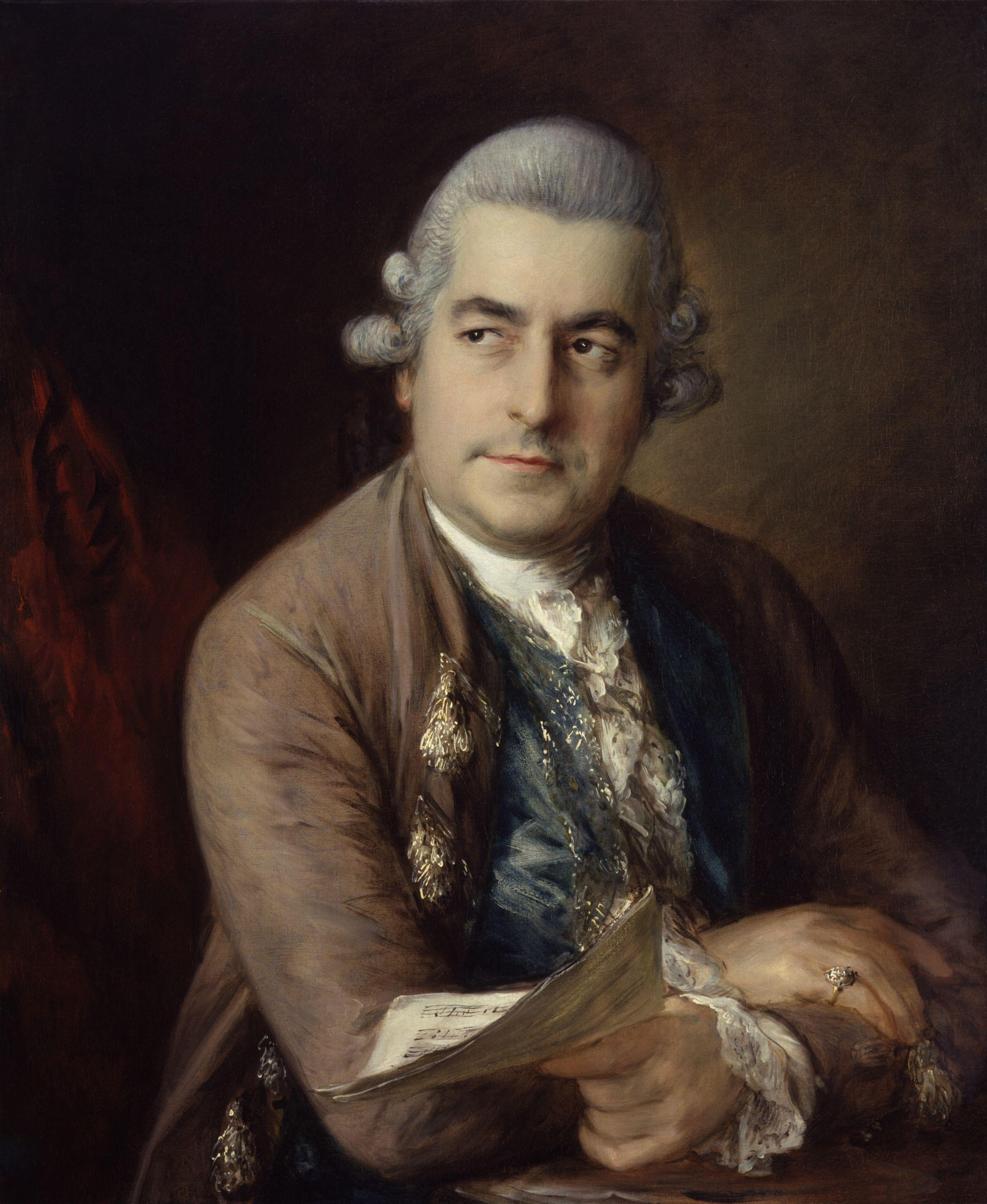
Portrait of Johann Christian Bach (1776), National Portrait Gallery, London

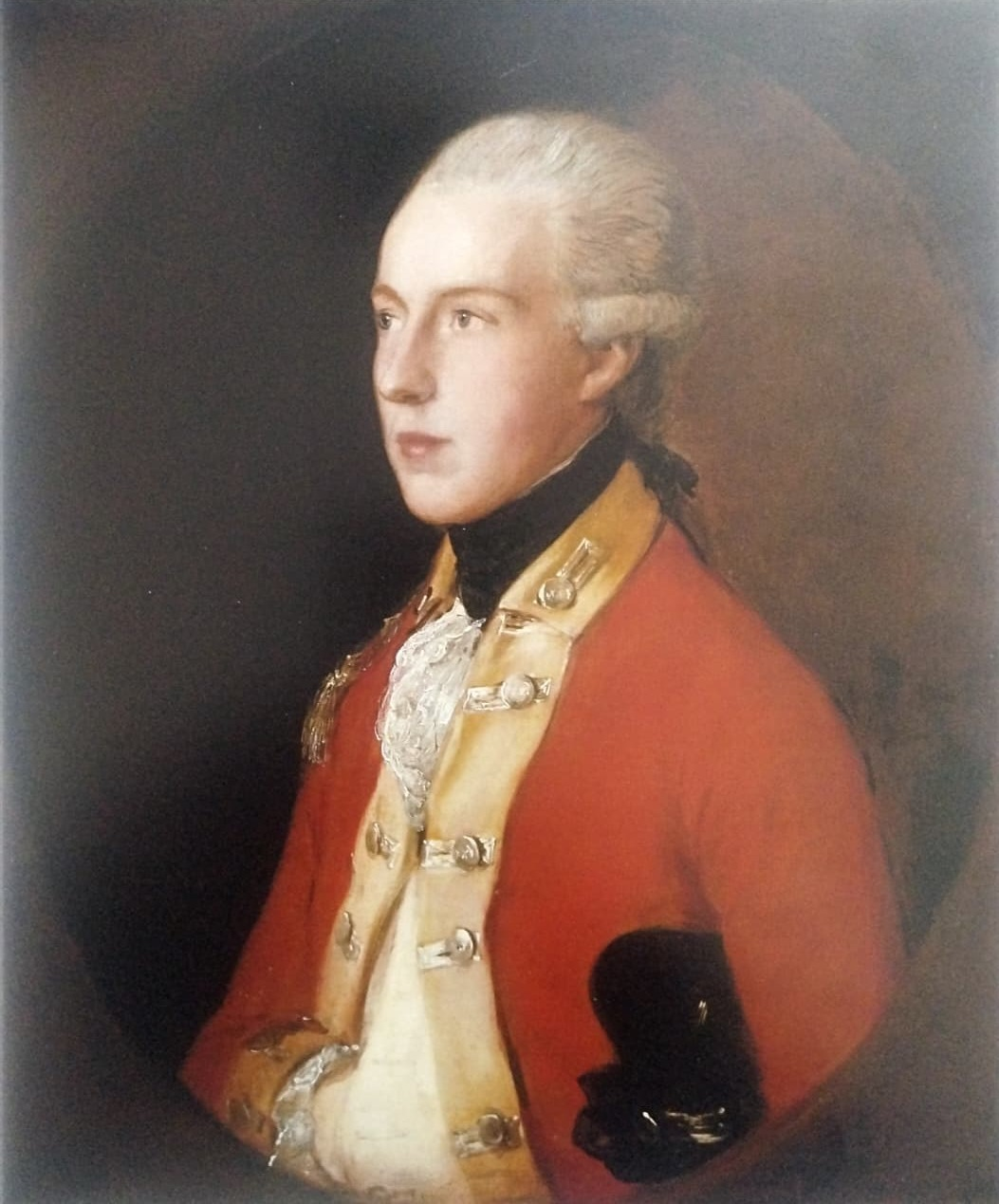
Captain John Stanley, in a 20th Regiment of Foot uniform, collection of Mary, Viscountess Eccles(1776)

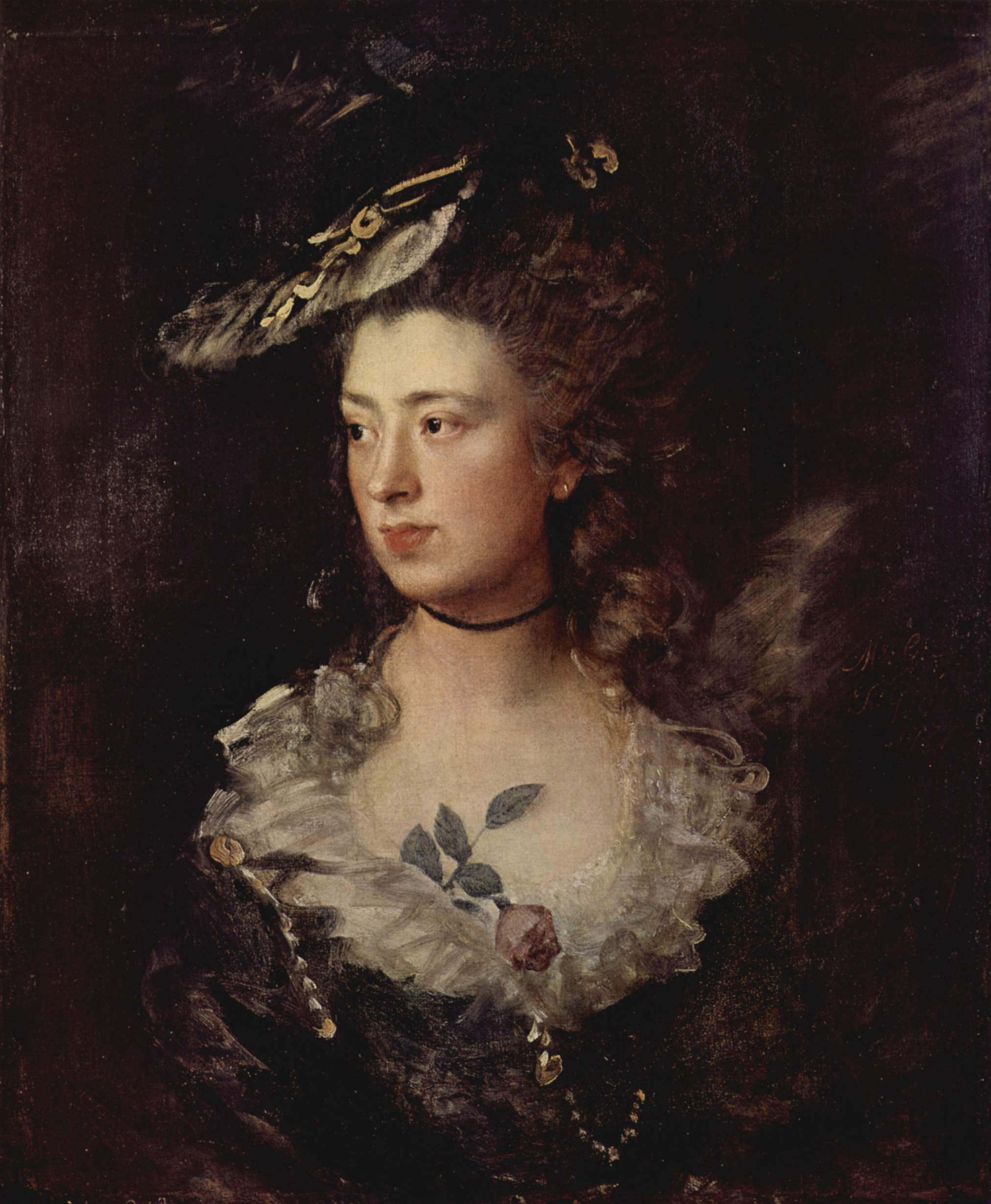
Portrait of Mary Gainsborough (1777), Tate Britain

The Hon. Mrs. Thomas "Mary" Graham (c. 1775–77), National Gallery of Art

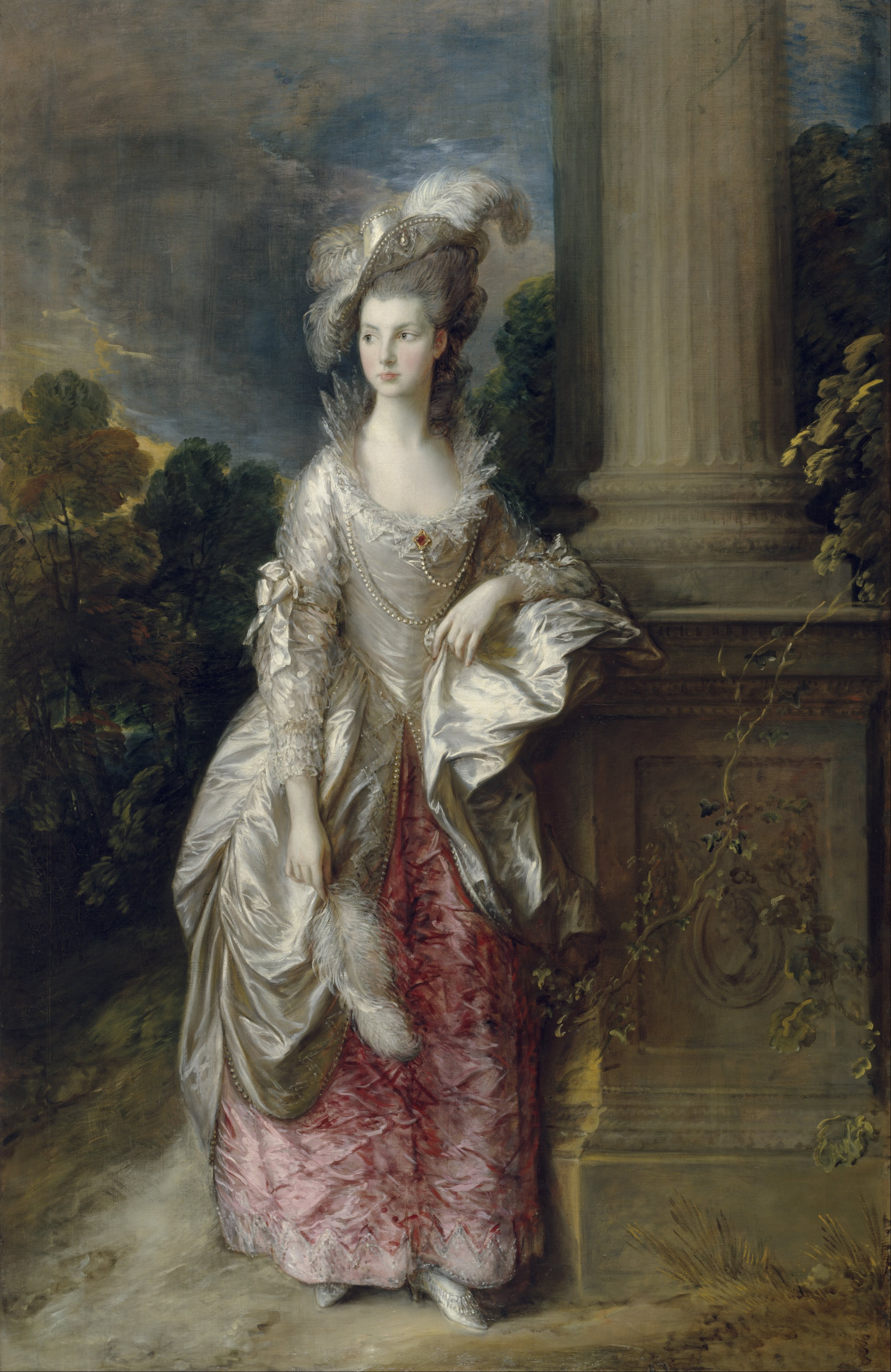
Portrait of Mrs Mary Graham (1777), Scottish National Gallery (wearing Jacobean inspired gown)

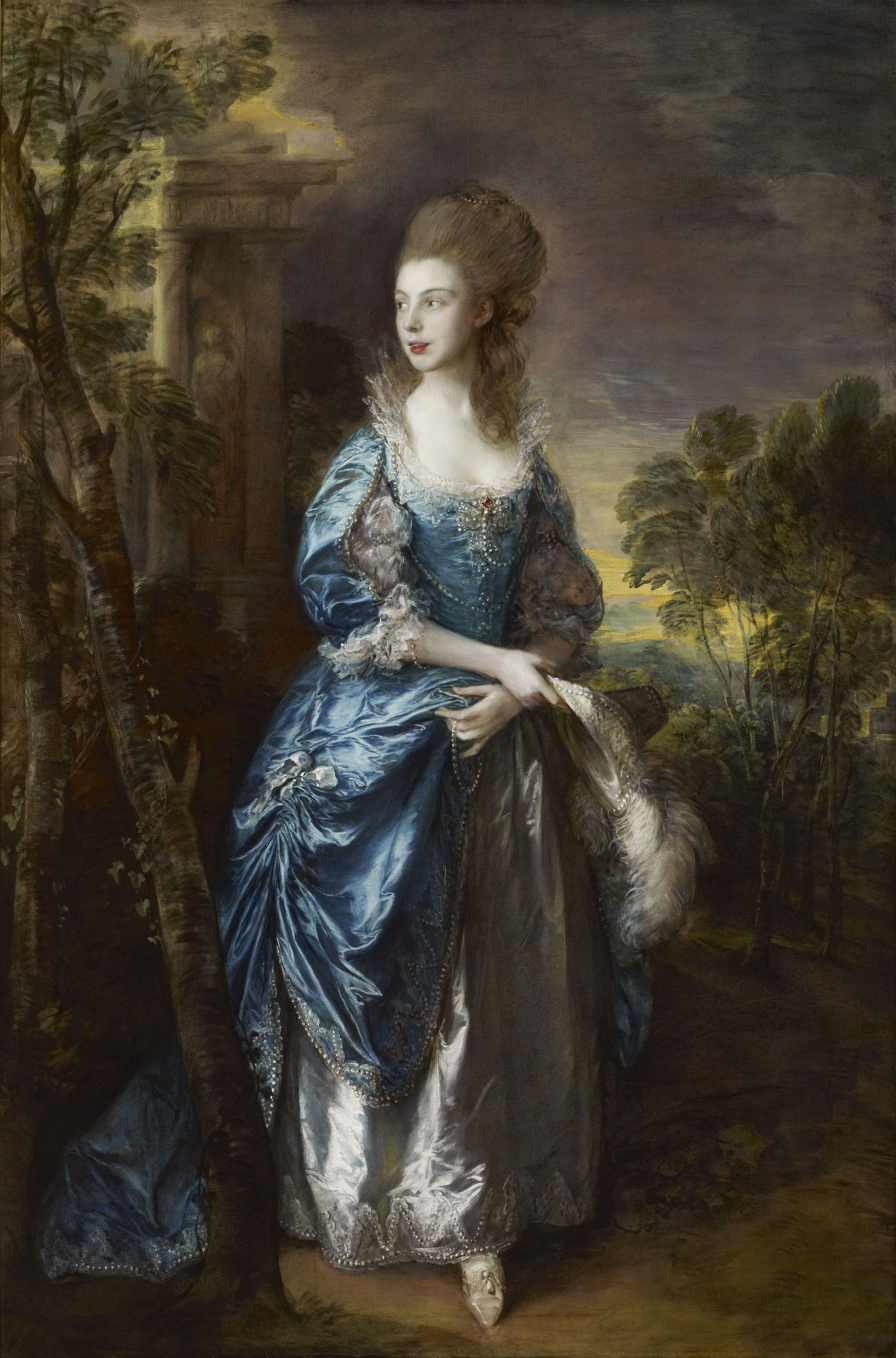
The Hon. Frances Duncombe (c. 1777)

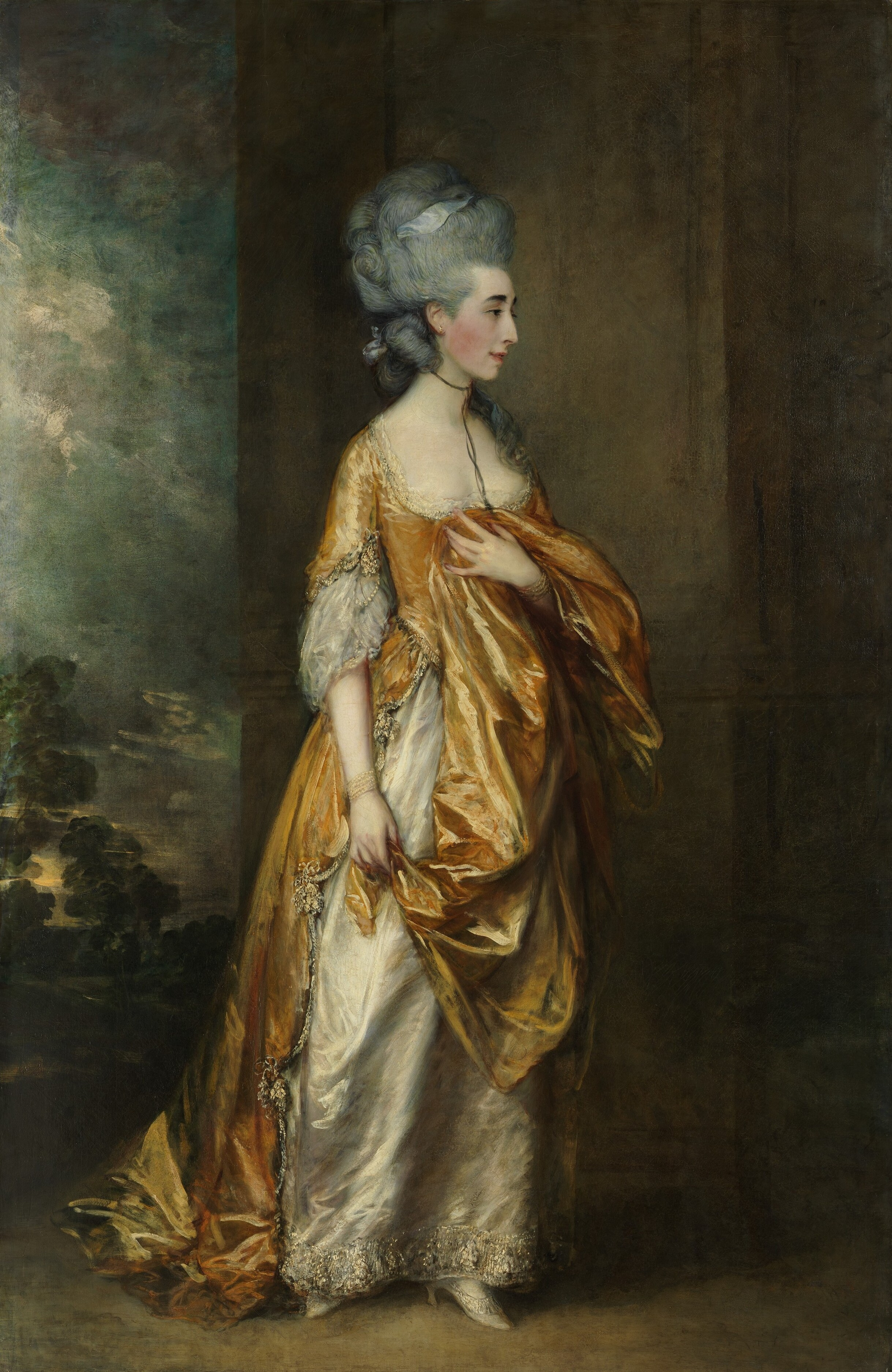
Mrs. Grace Dalrymple Elliott (1778), Metropolitan Museum of Art

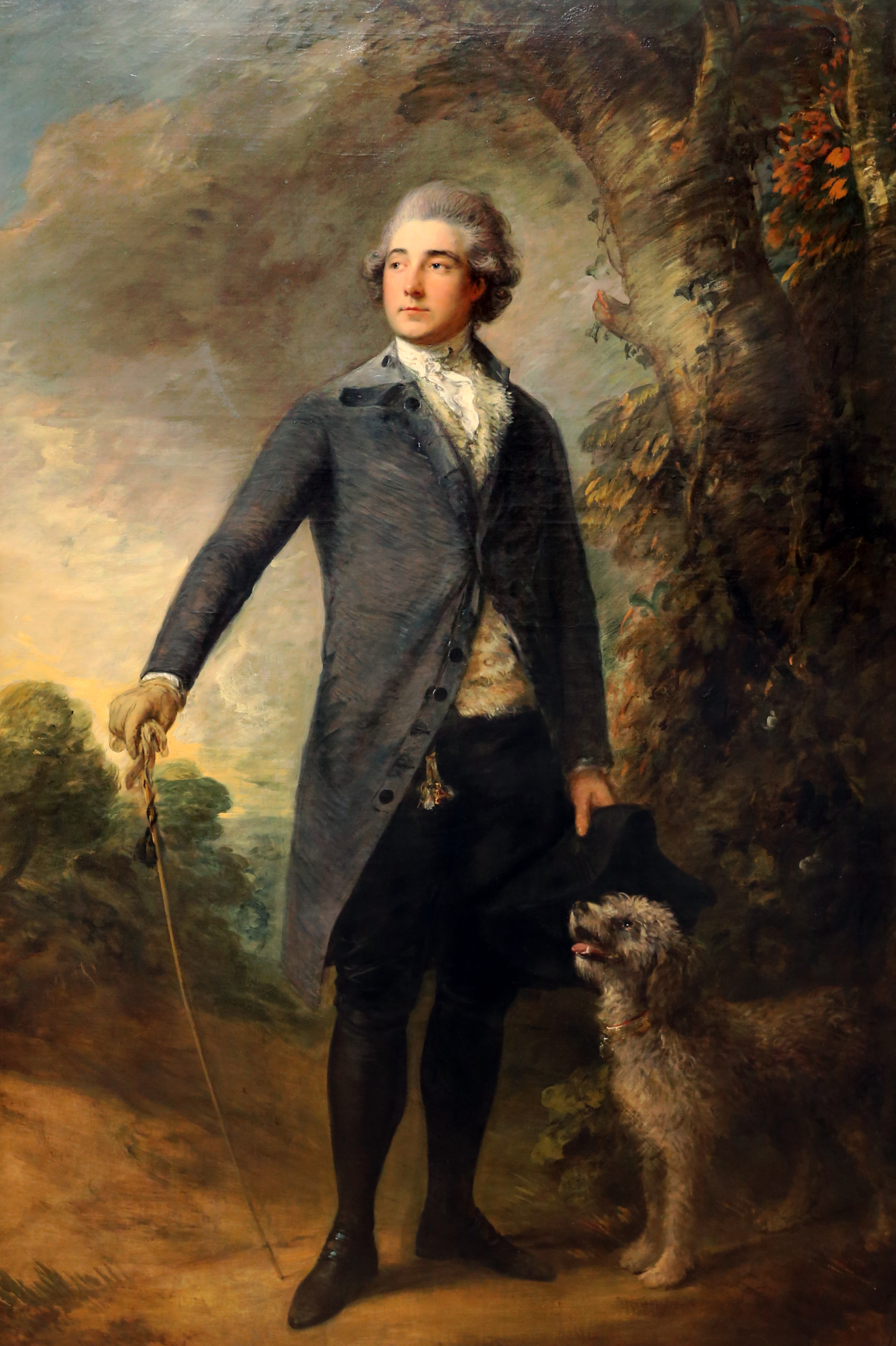
Sir Henry Bate-Dudley (1780)

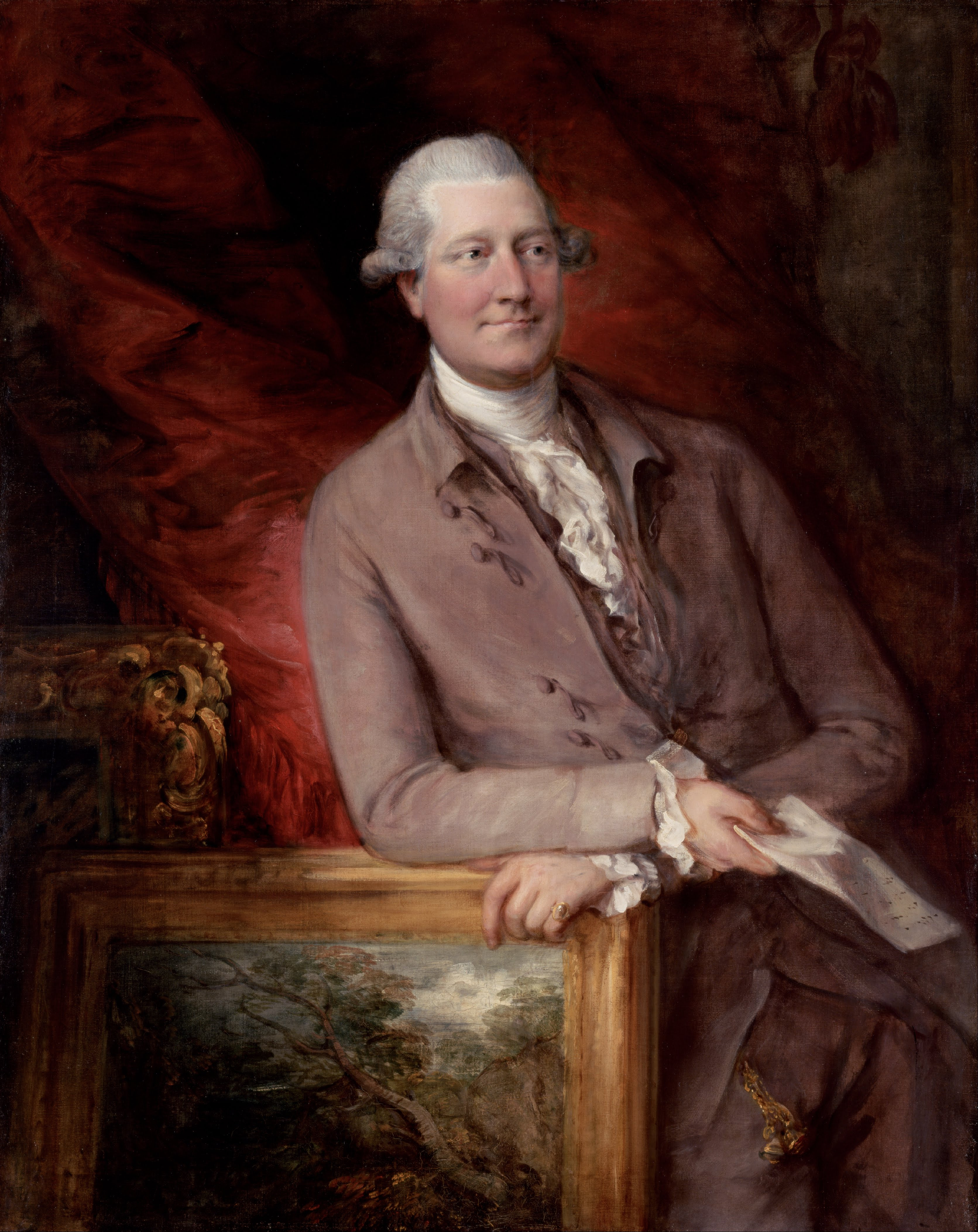
Portrait of James Christie (1778), J. Paul Getty Museum

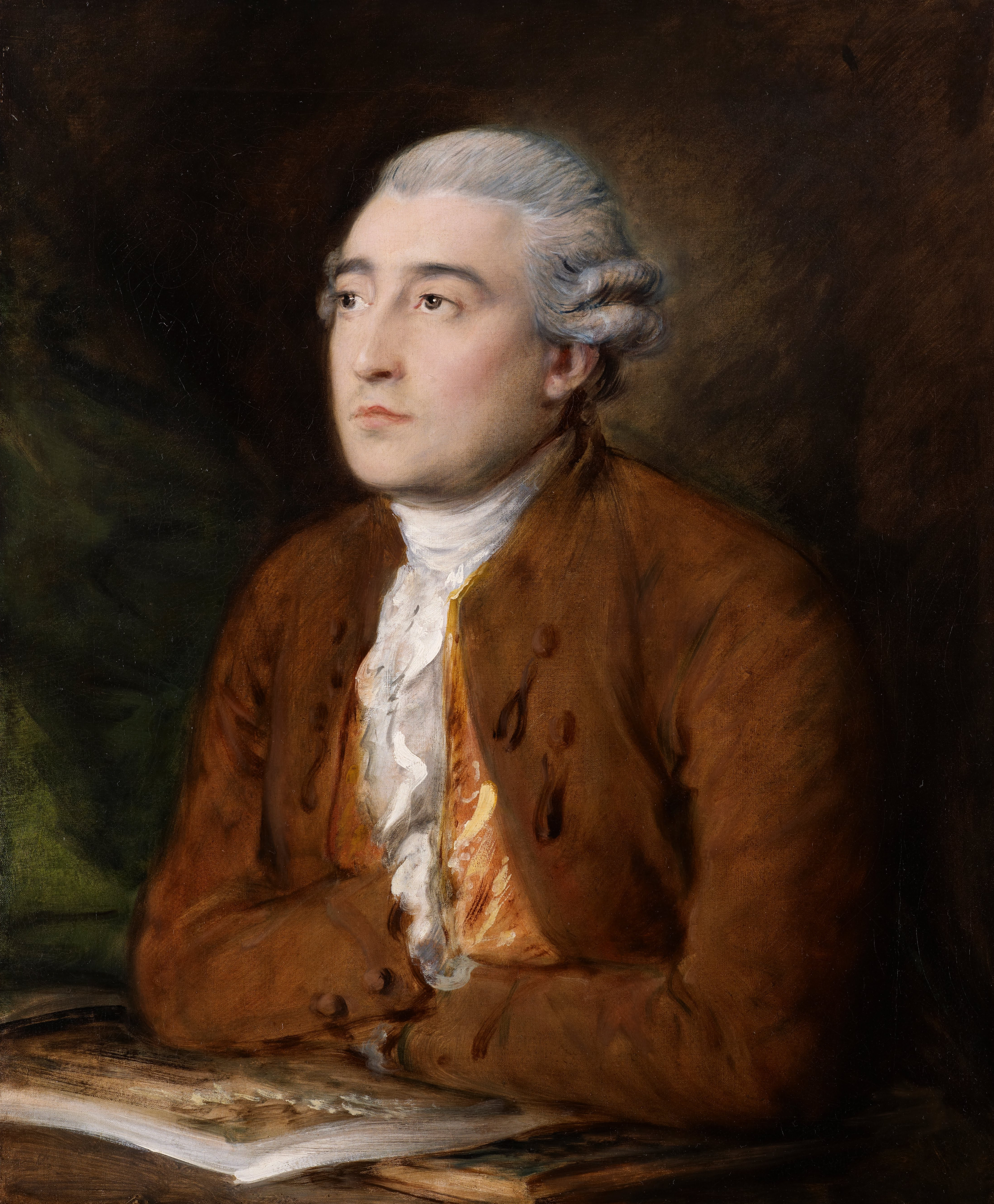
Portrait of Philip James de Loutherbourg (1778), Dulwich Picture Gallery

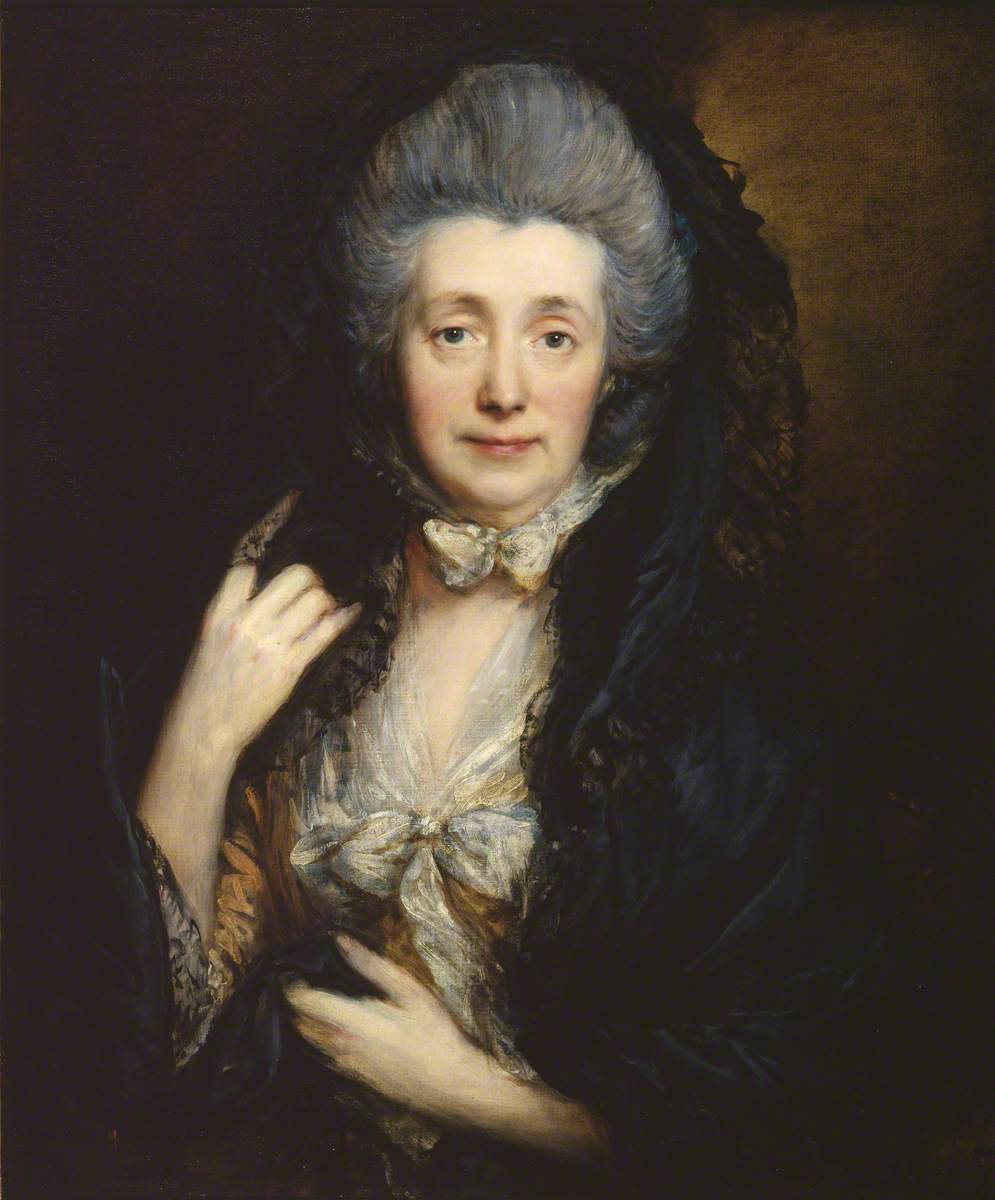
Portrait of Margaret Gainsborough (1778), Courtauld Gallery

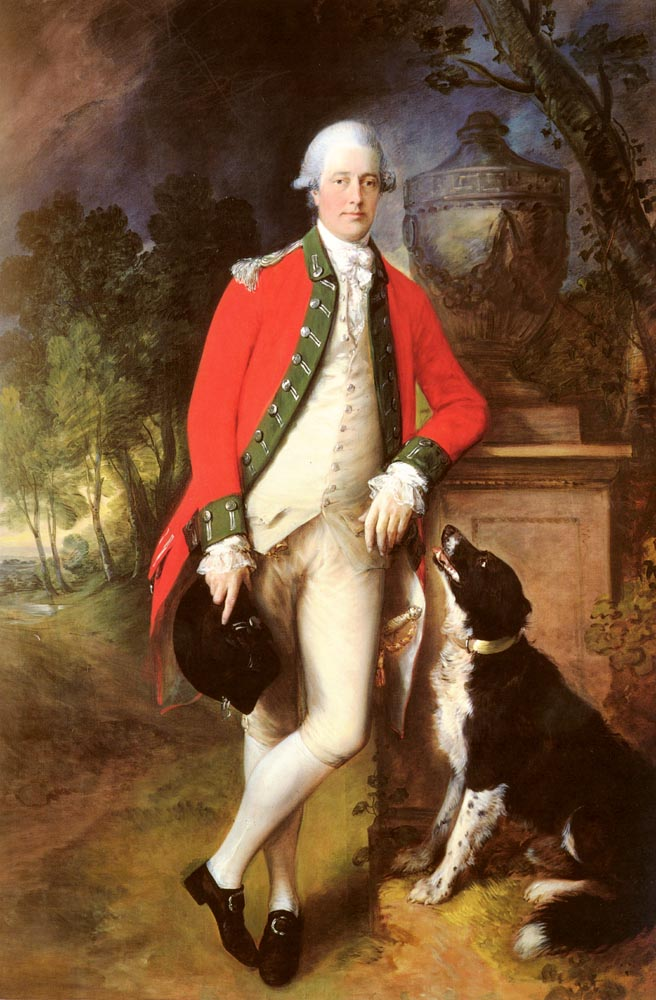
Colonel John Bullock (c. 1780), Blanton Museum of Art

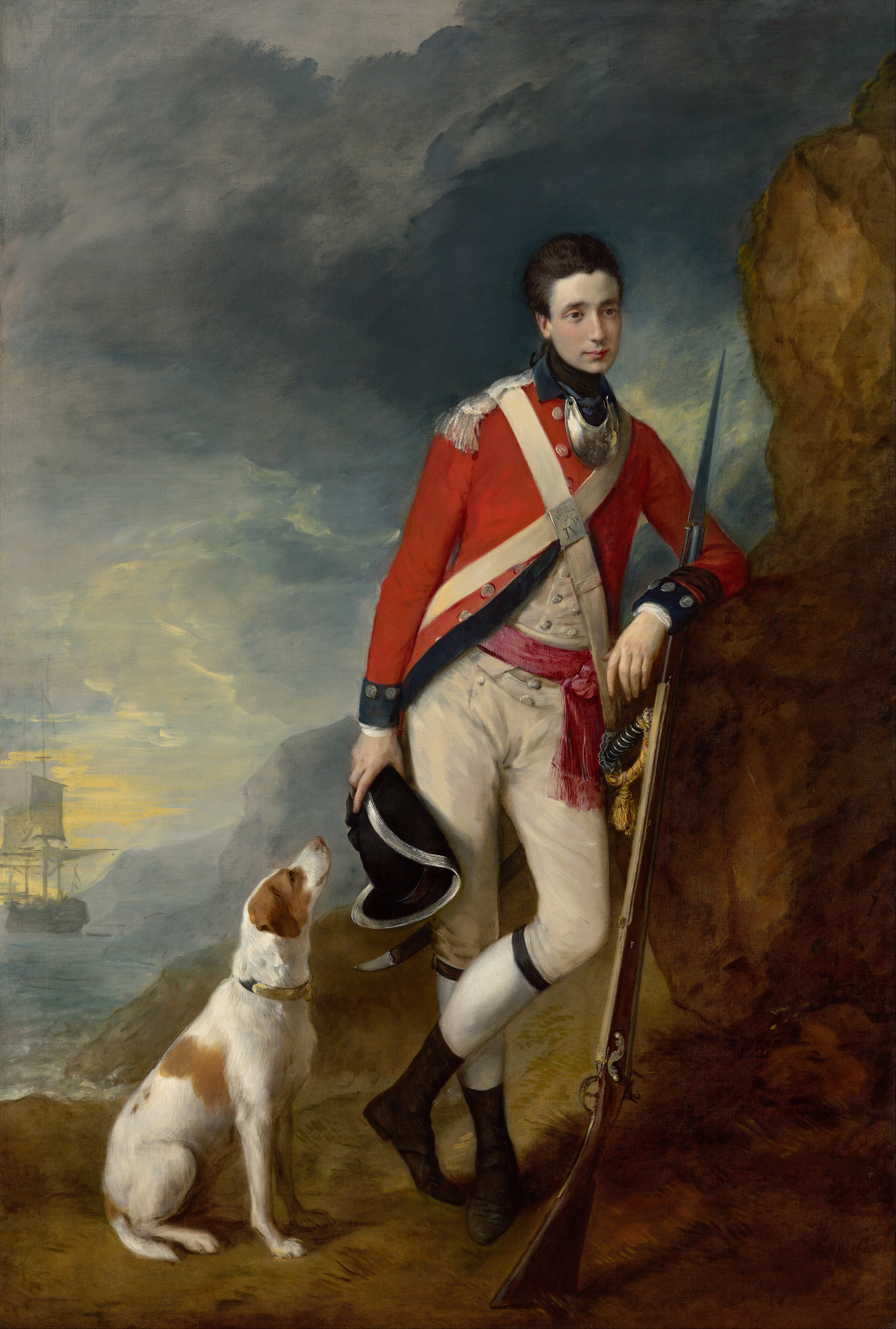
[Richard st George]An officer of the 4th Regiment of Foot (c. 1776), National Gallery of Victoria

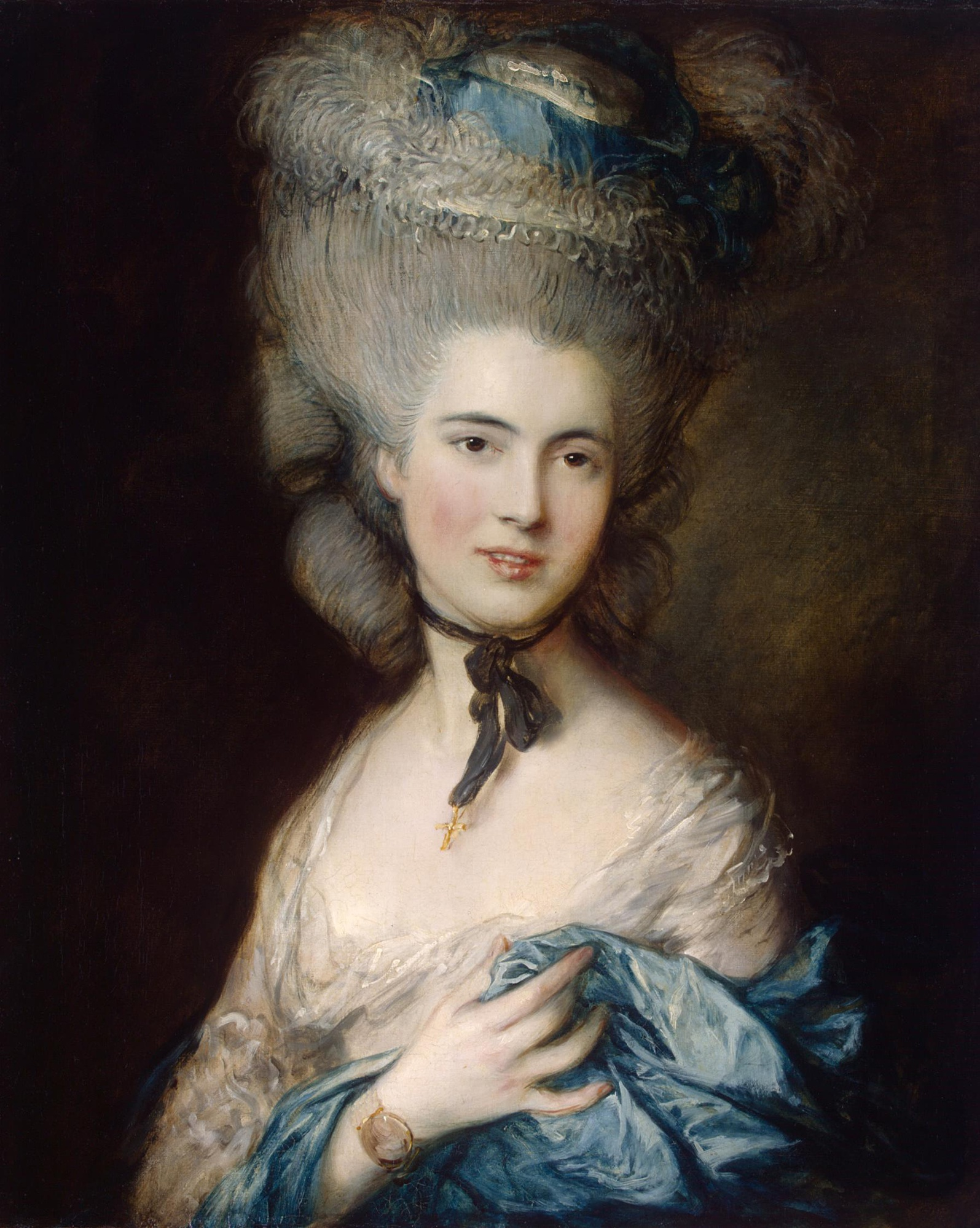
Woman in Blue (c. 1780), Hermitage Museum

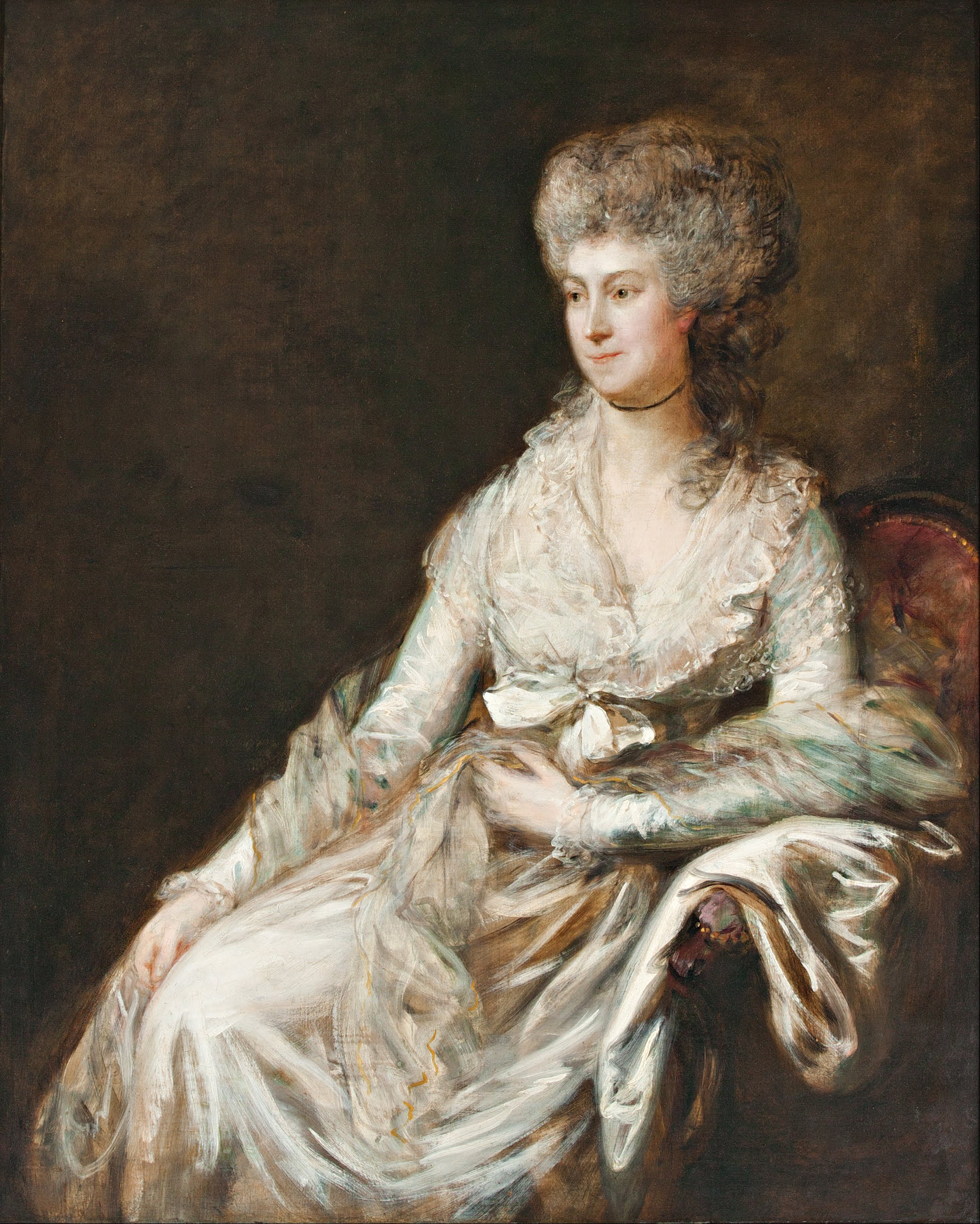
Madame Lebrun (1780), Art Gallery of South Australia

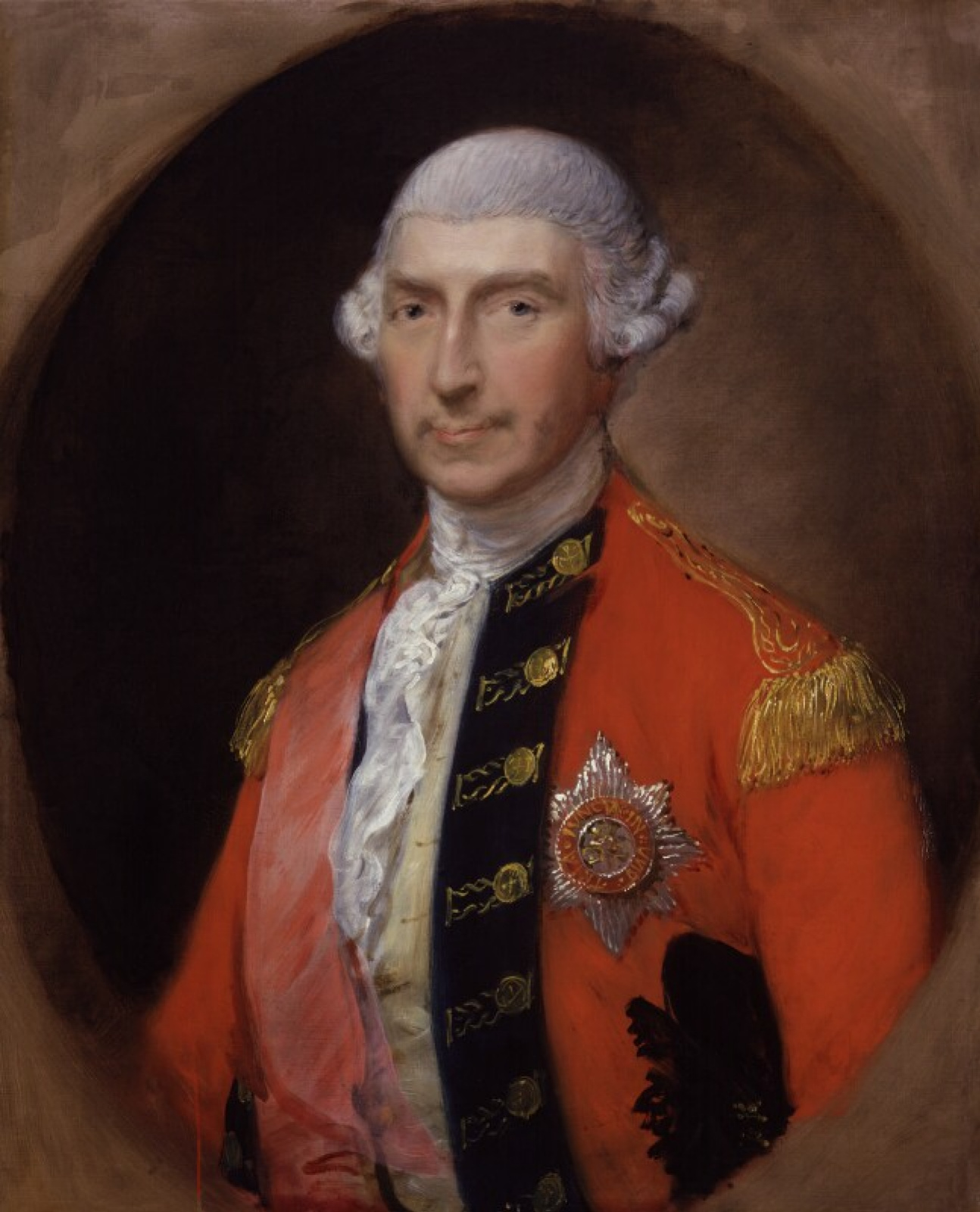
Portrait of Jeffery Amherst, 1780

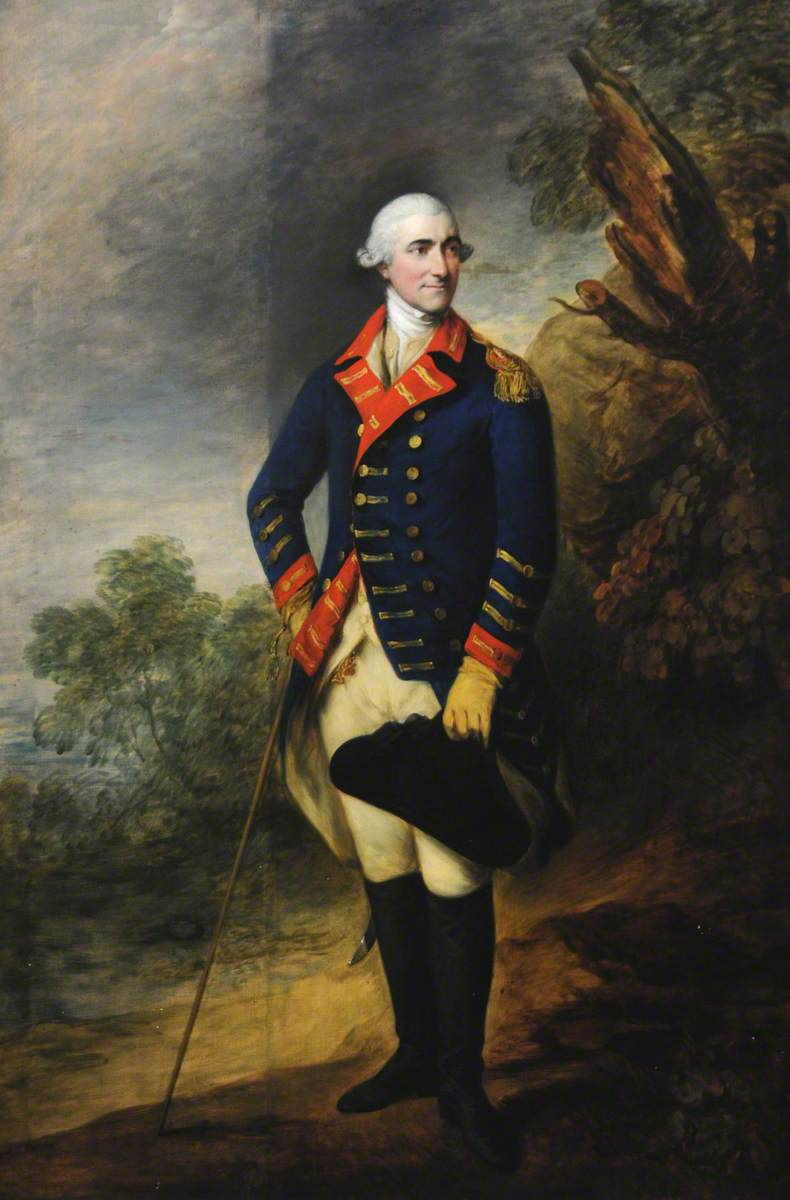
Portrait of Henry Seymour Conway, 1780

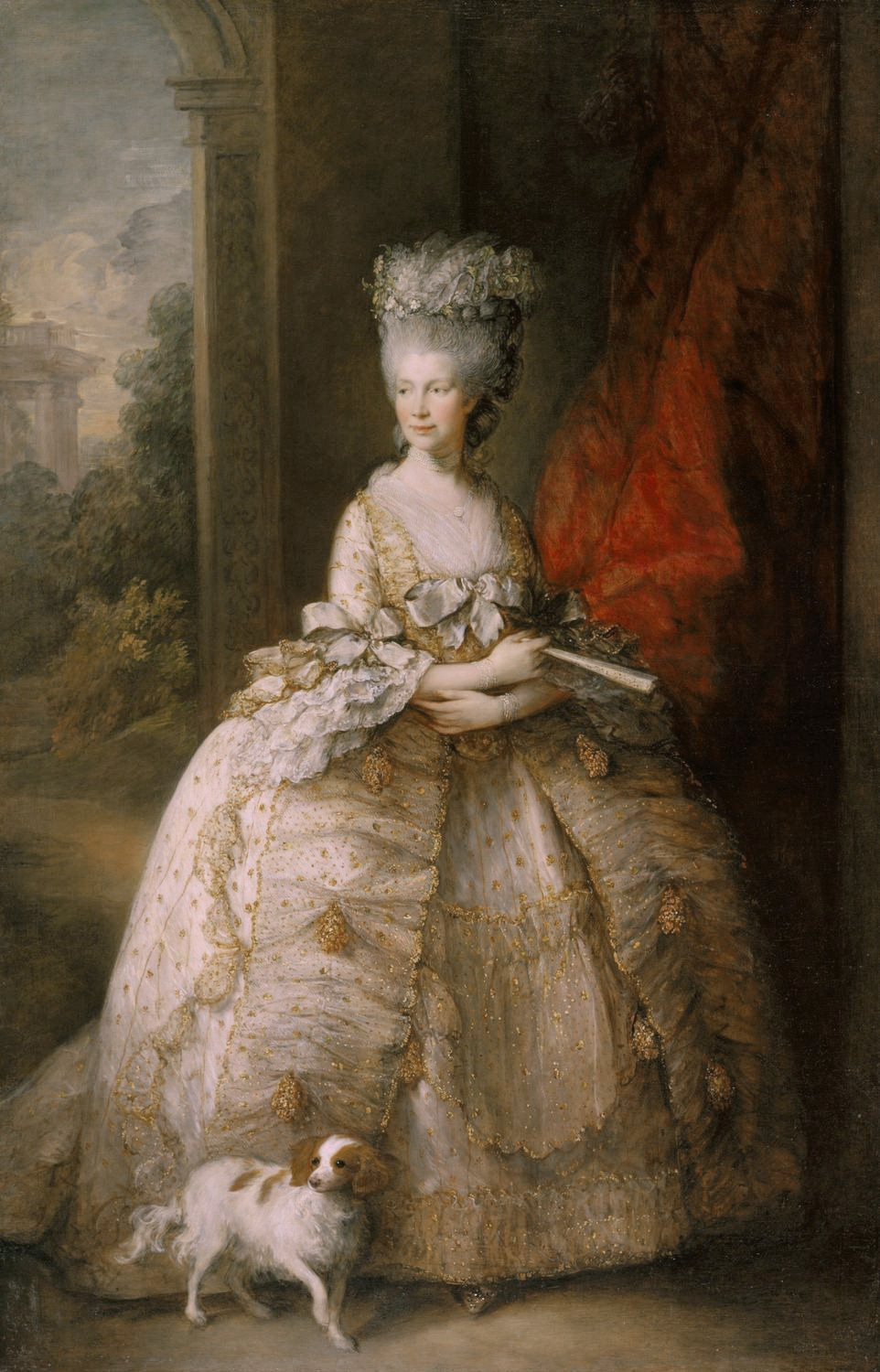
Portrait of Queen Charlotte (c. 1781) Royal Collection

Portrait of Giovanna Baccelli (c. 1782), Tate Britain

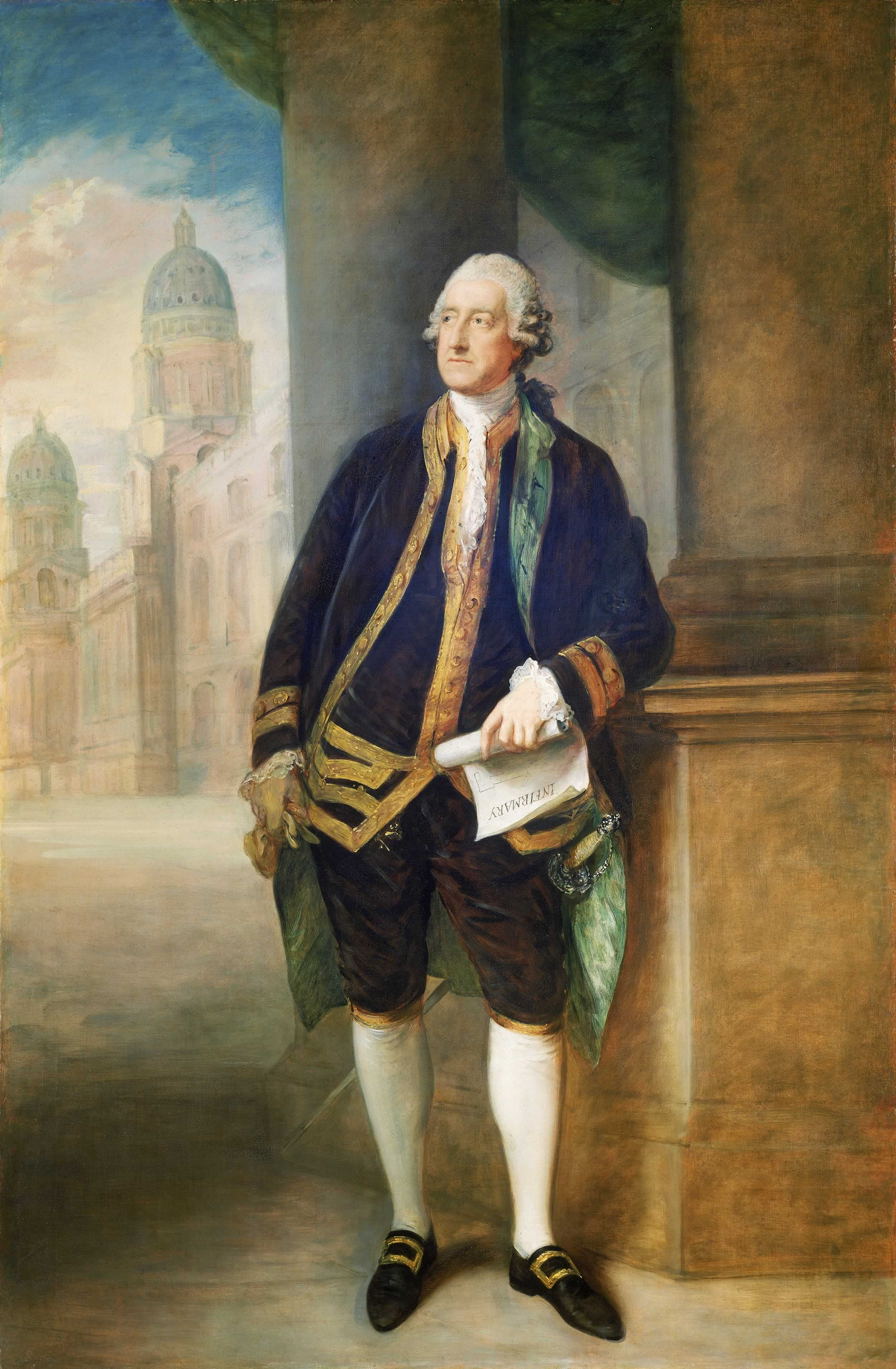
Portrait of the Earl of Sandwich (1783), National Maritime Museum

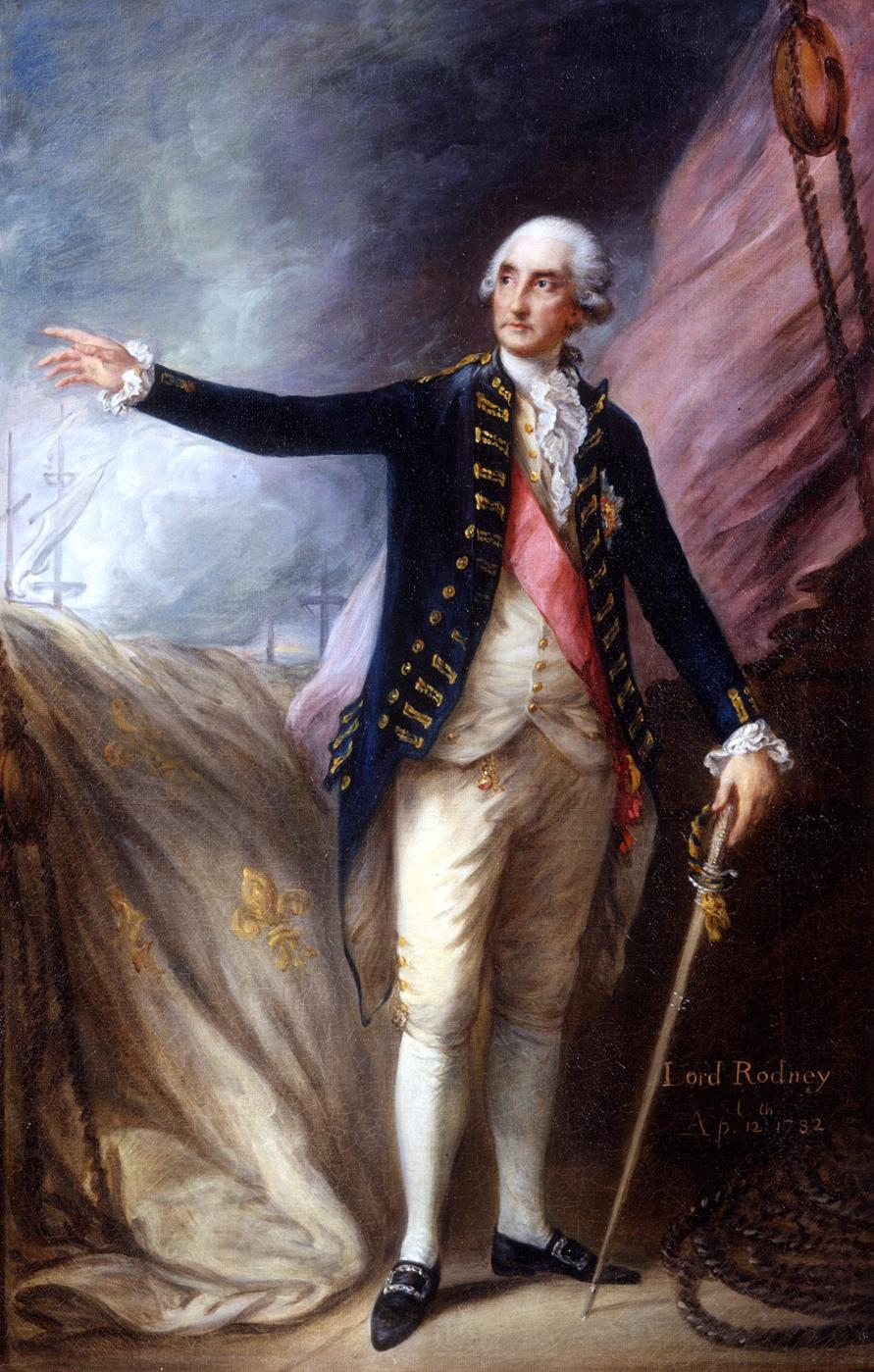
Portrait of Admiral Rodney (1783), Private Collection

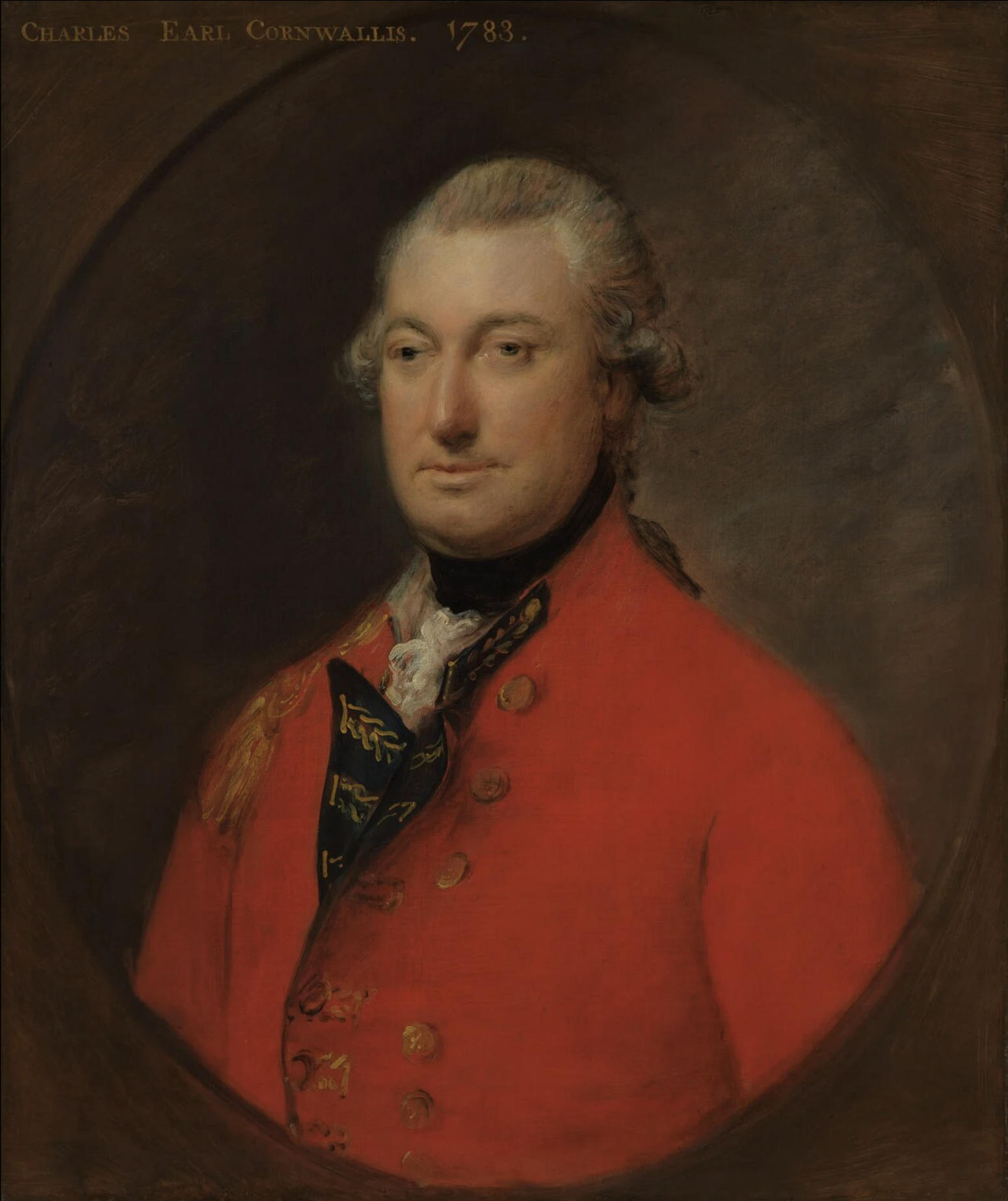
Portrait of Lord Cornwallis (1783), National Portrait Gallery

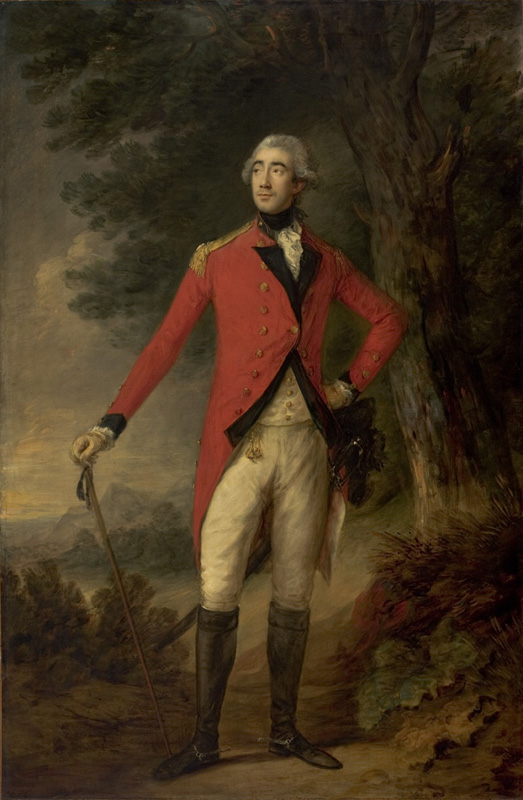
Portrait of Lord Rawdon, 1784, São Paulo Museum of Art

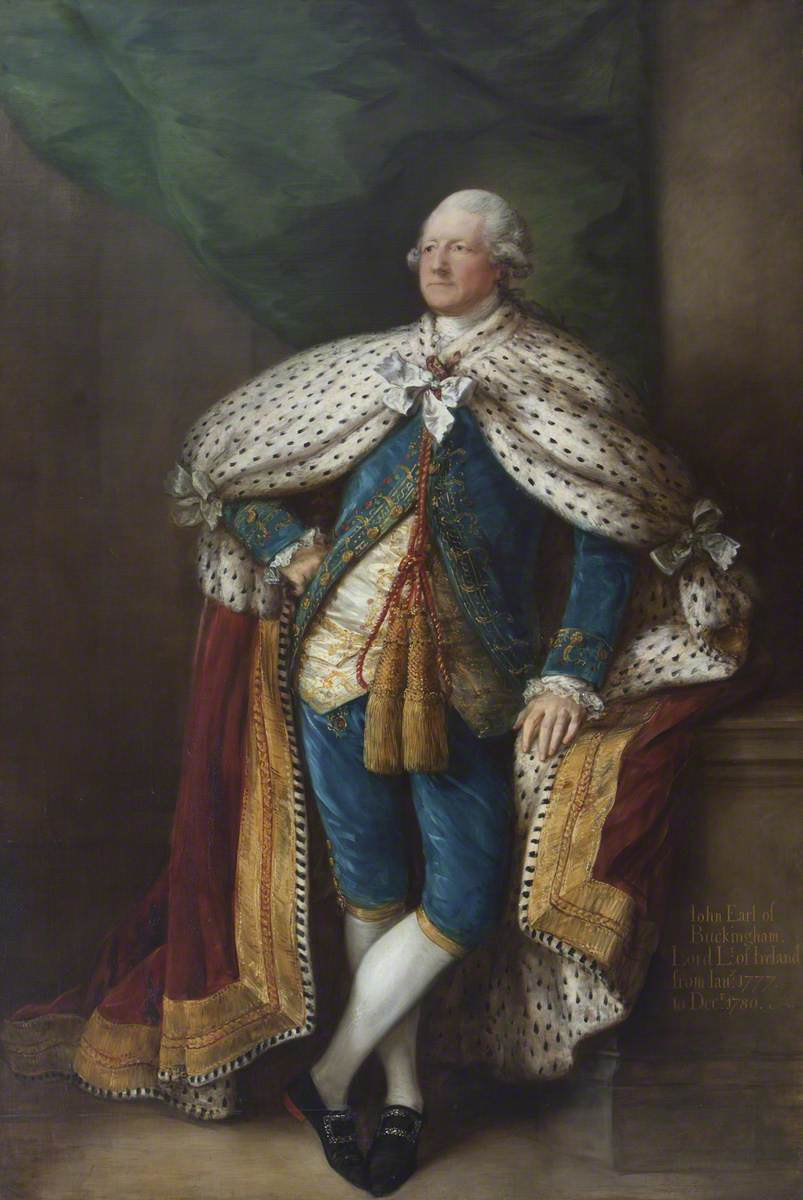
Portrait of the Earl of Buckinghamshire (1784), Blickling Hall

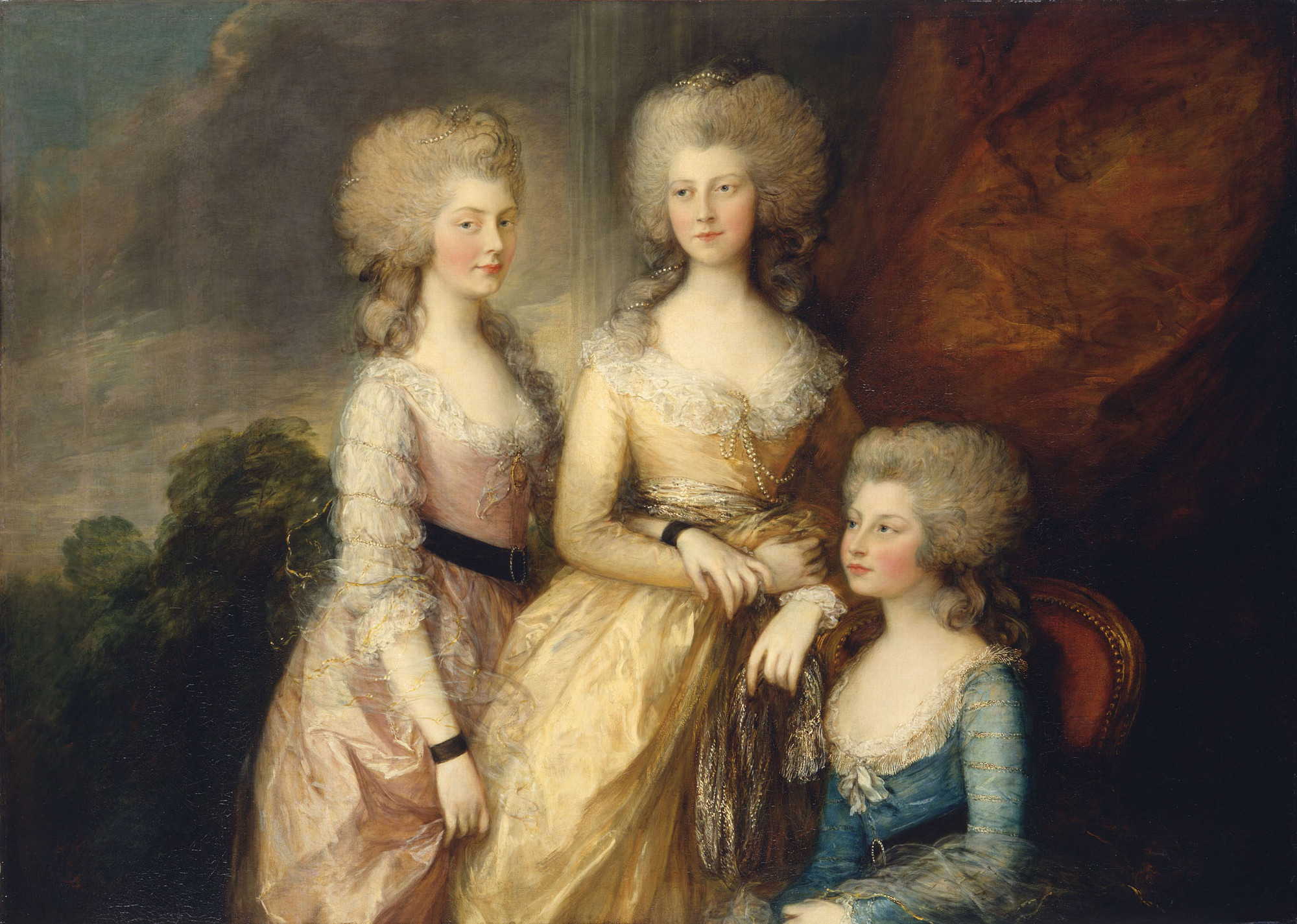
The Three Eldest Princesses (1784)

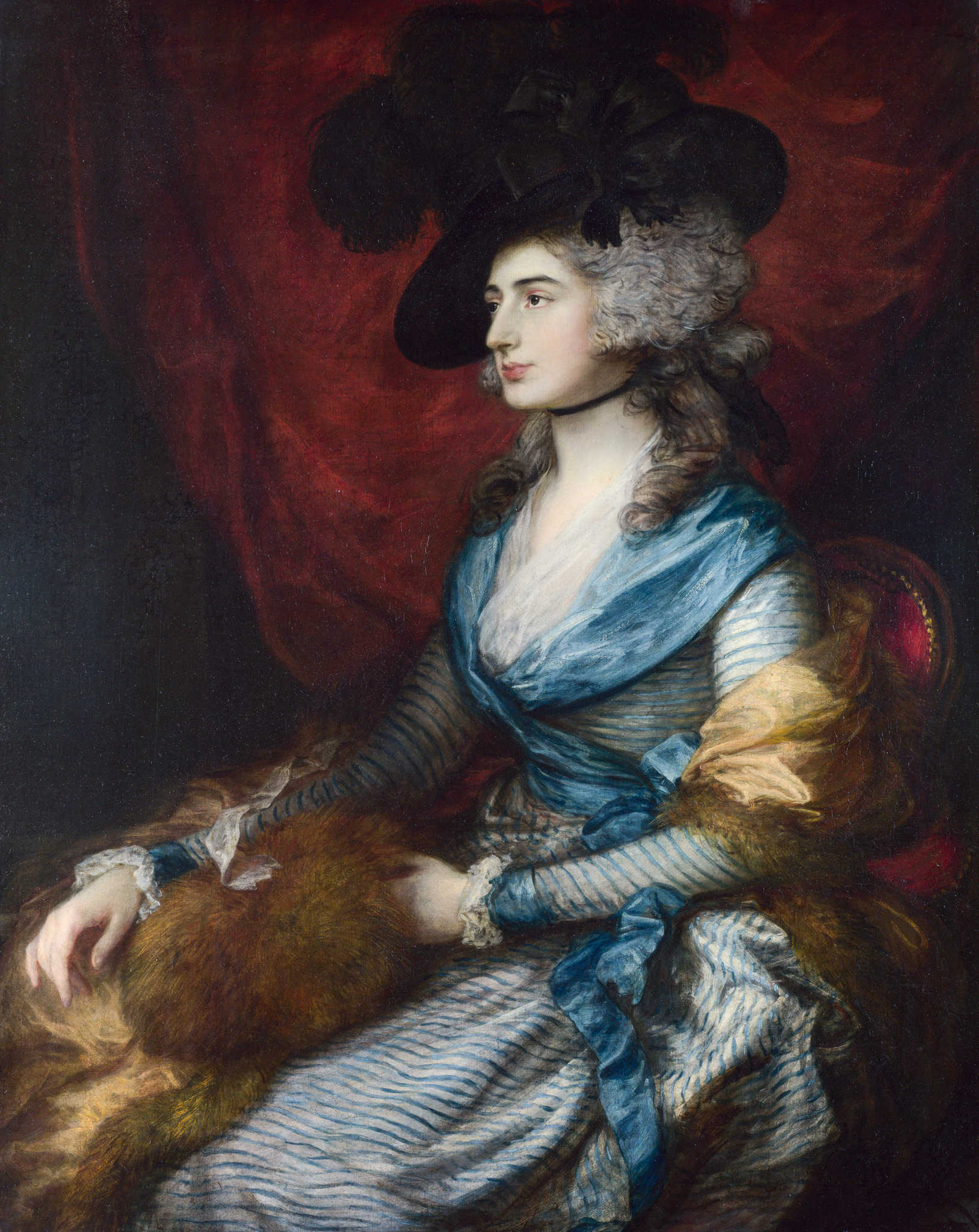
Portrait of Sarah Siddons (1785), National Gallery

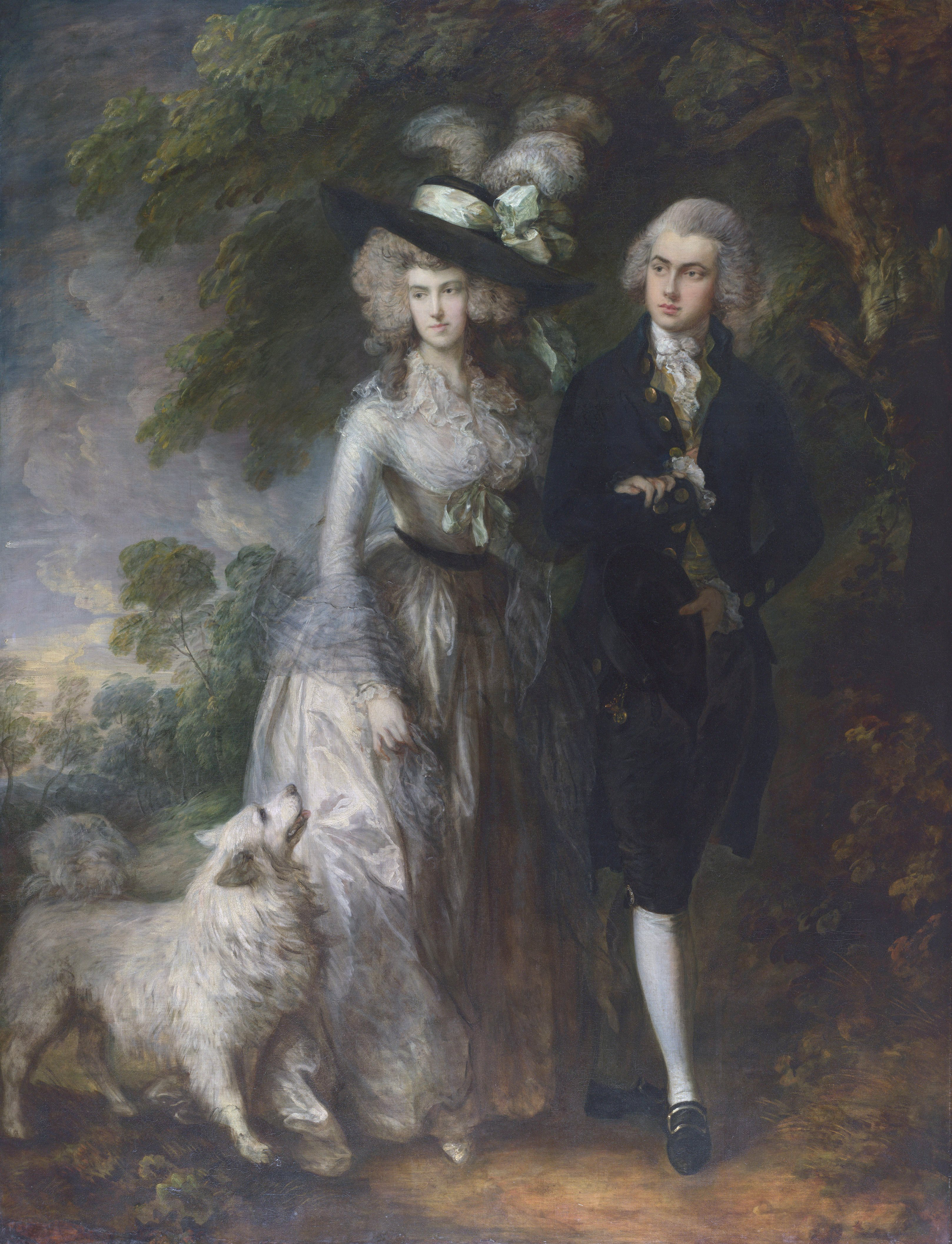
The Morning Walk (1785), National Gallery

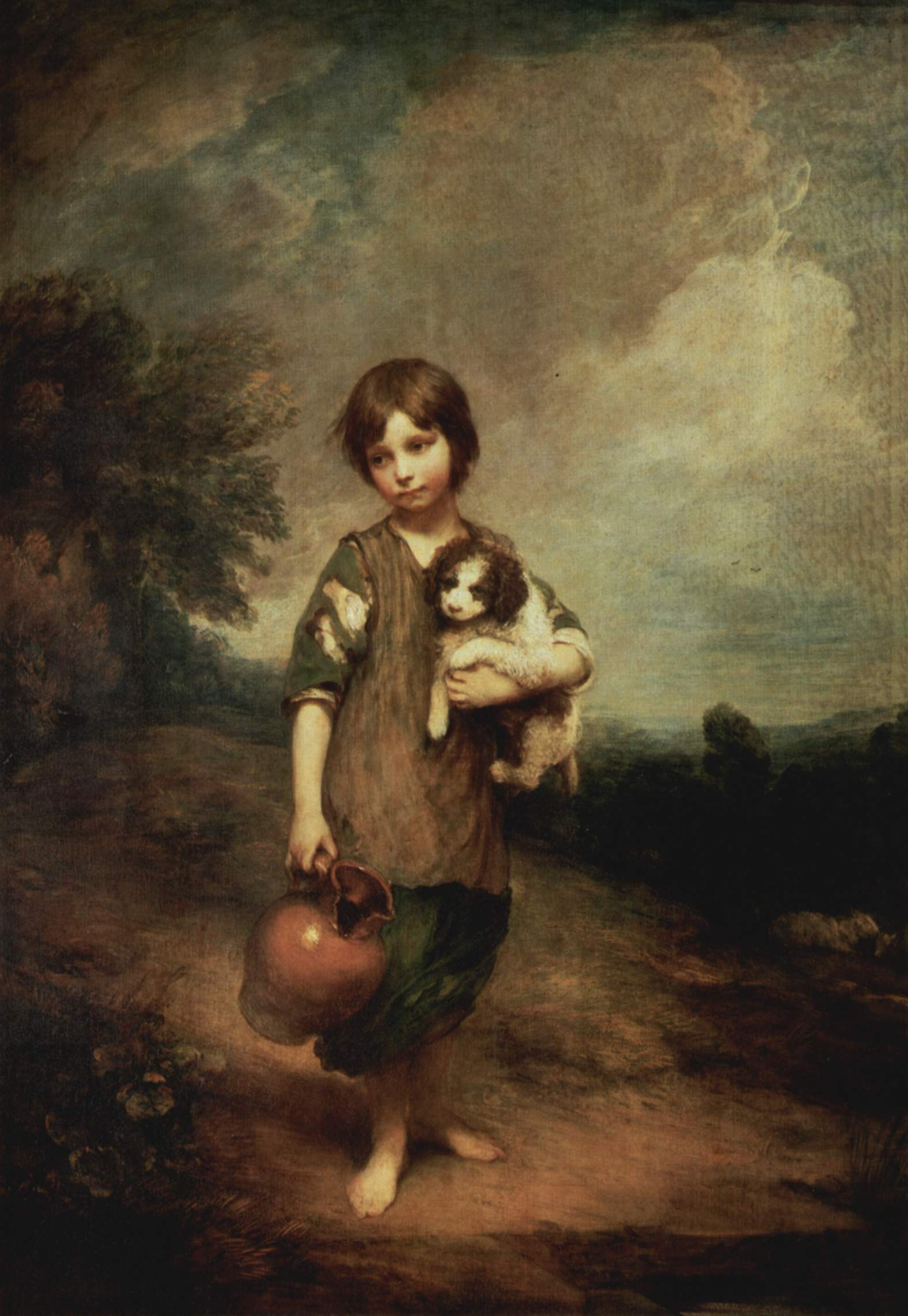
The Cottage Girl (1785), National Gallery of Ireland

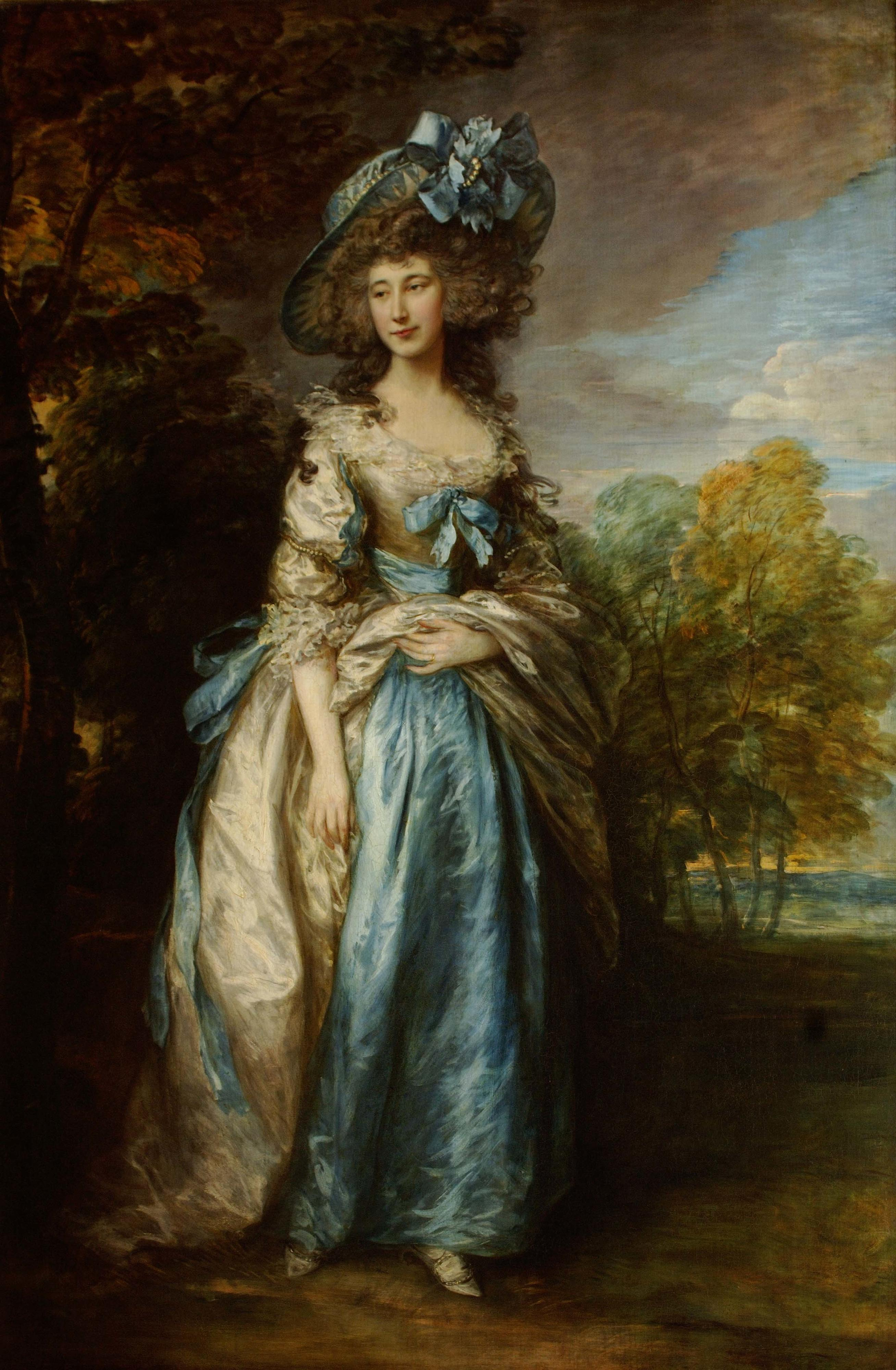
Portrait of Sophia Charlotte Digby, Lady Sheffield, (c. 1785–86), Waddesdon Manor

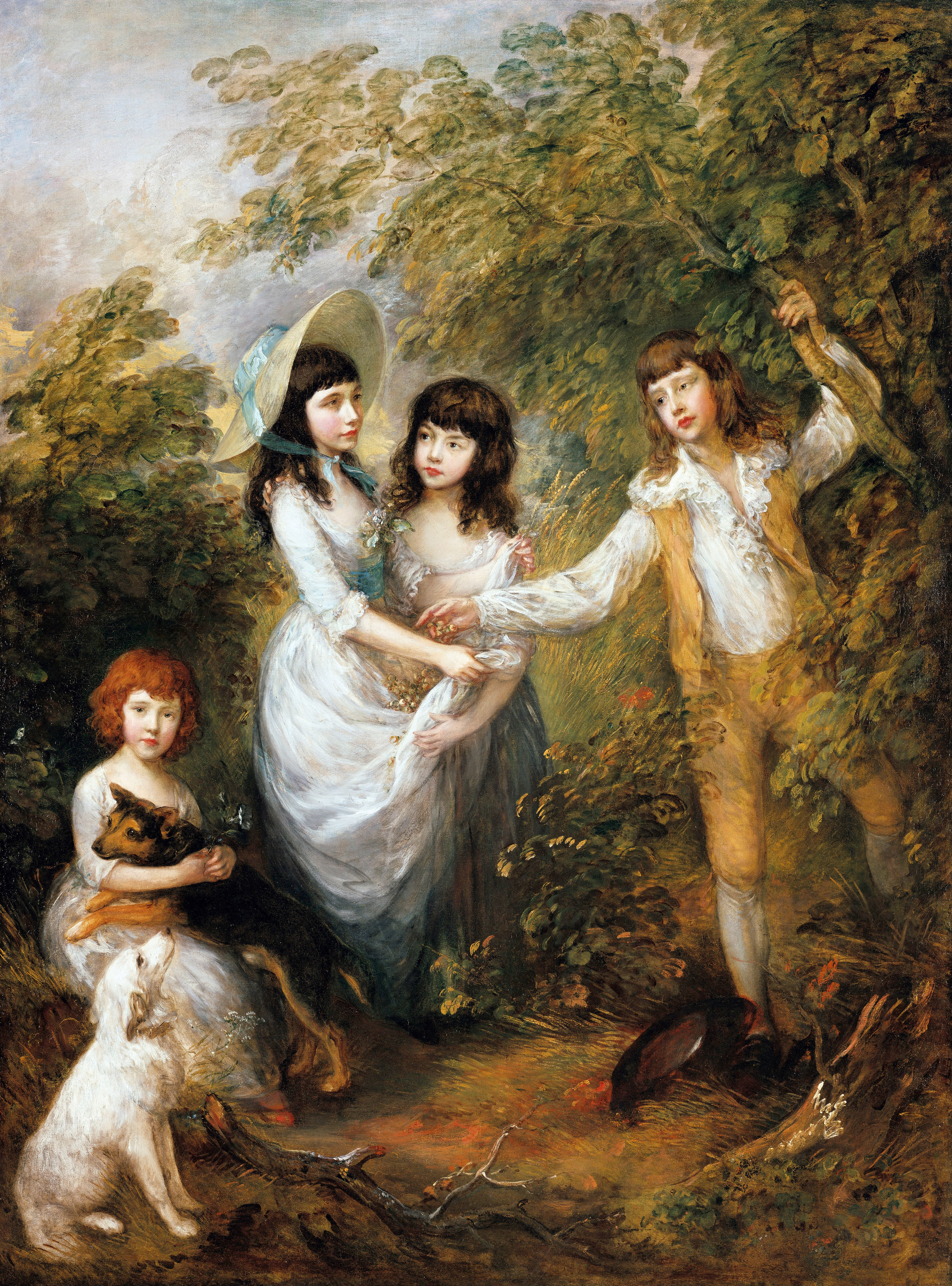
The Marsham Children (1787), Gemäldegalerie

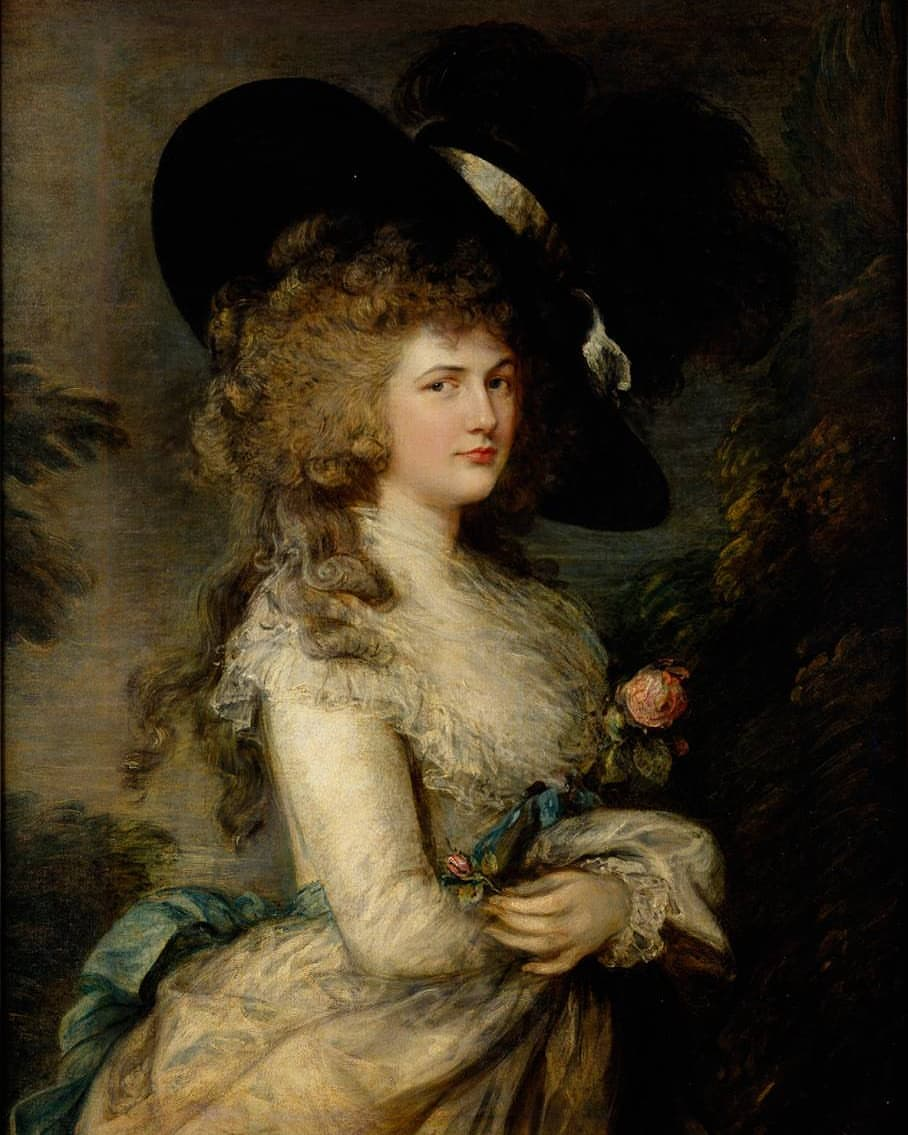
Portrait of Georgiana, Duchess of Devonshire (1787), Chatsworth House

Mrs Richard Brinsley Sheridan (1787), National Gallery of Art
Landscapes

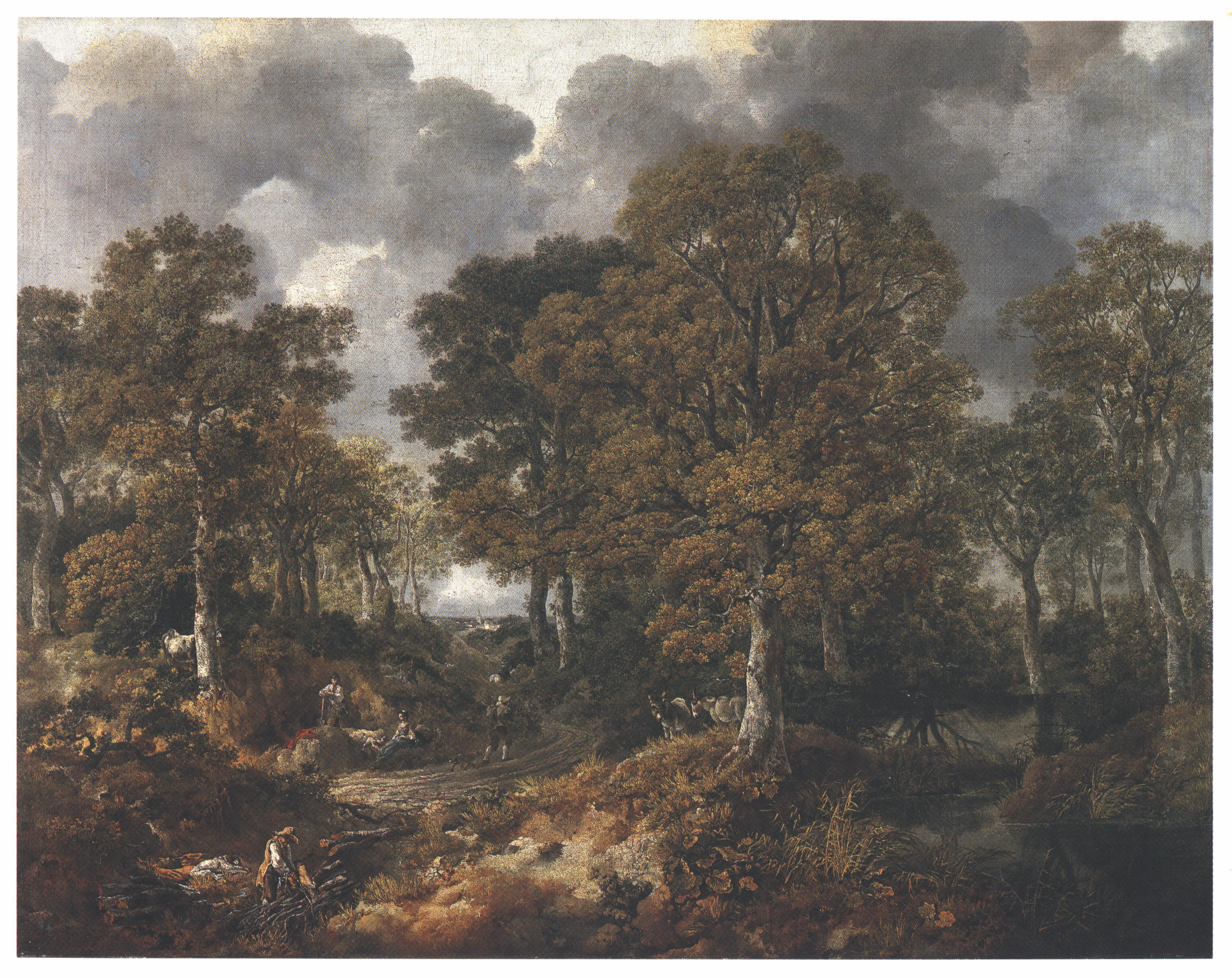
Cornard Wood, near Sudbury, Suffolk (1748), National Gallery

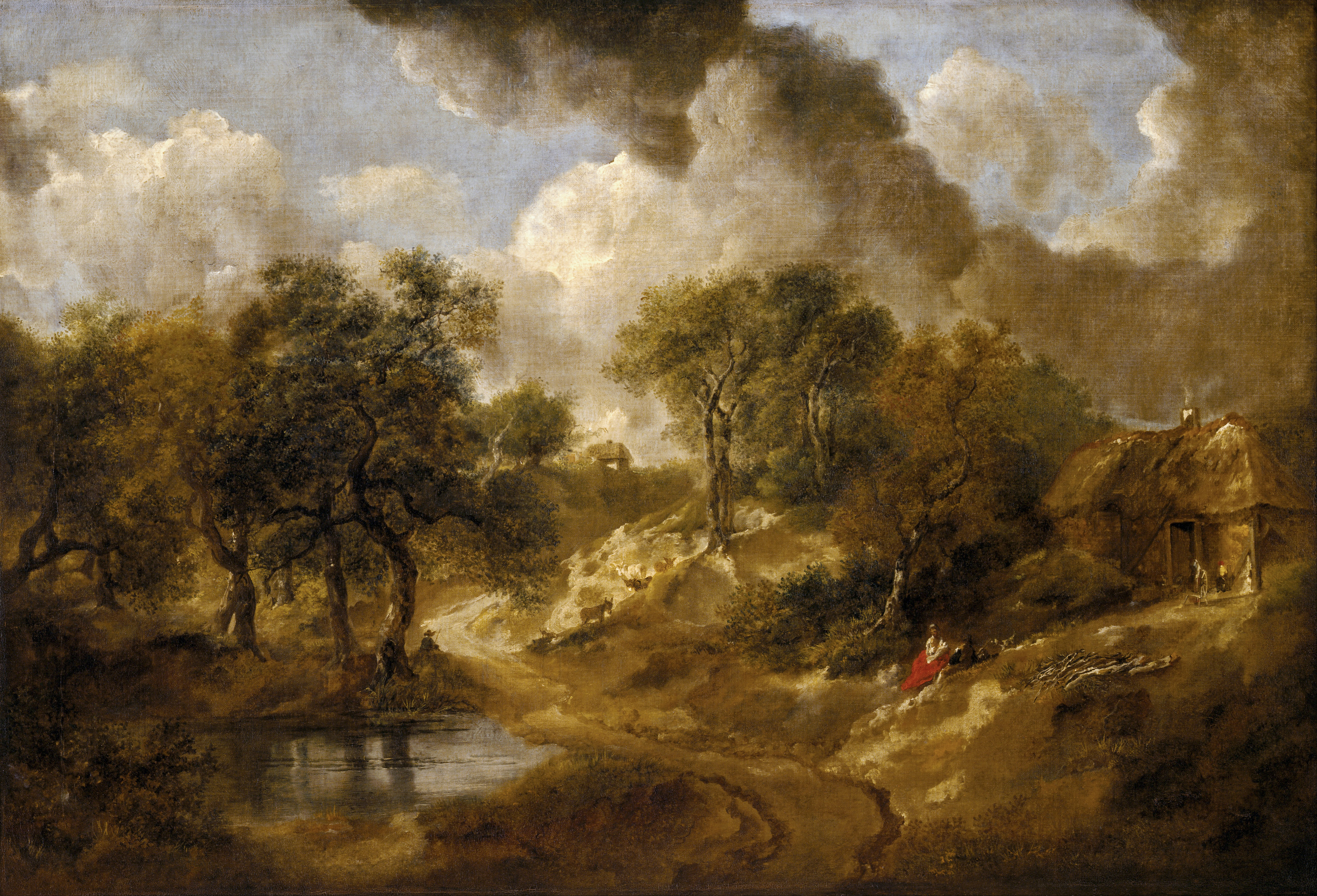
Landscape in Suffolk (1748), Kunsthistorisches Museum

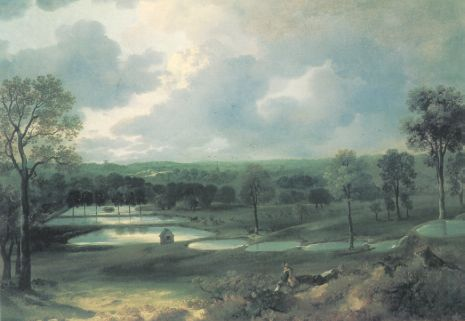
Holywells Park, Ipswich (c. 1748–50), Christchurch Mansion

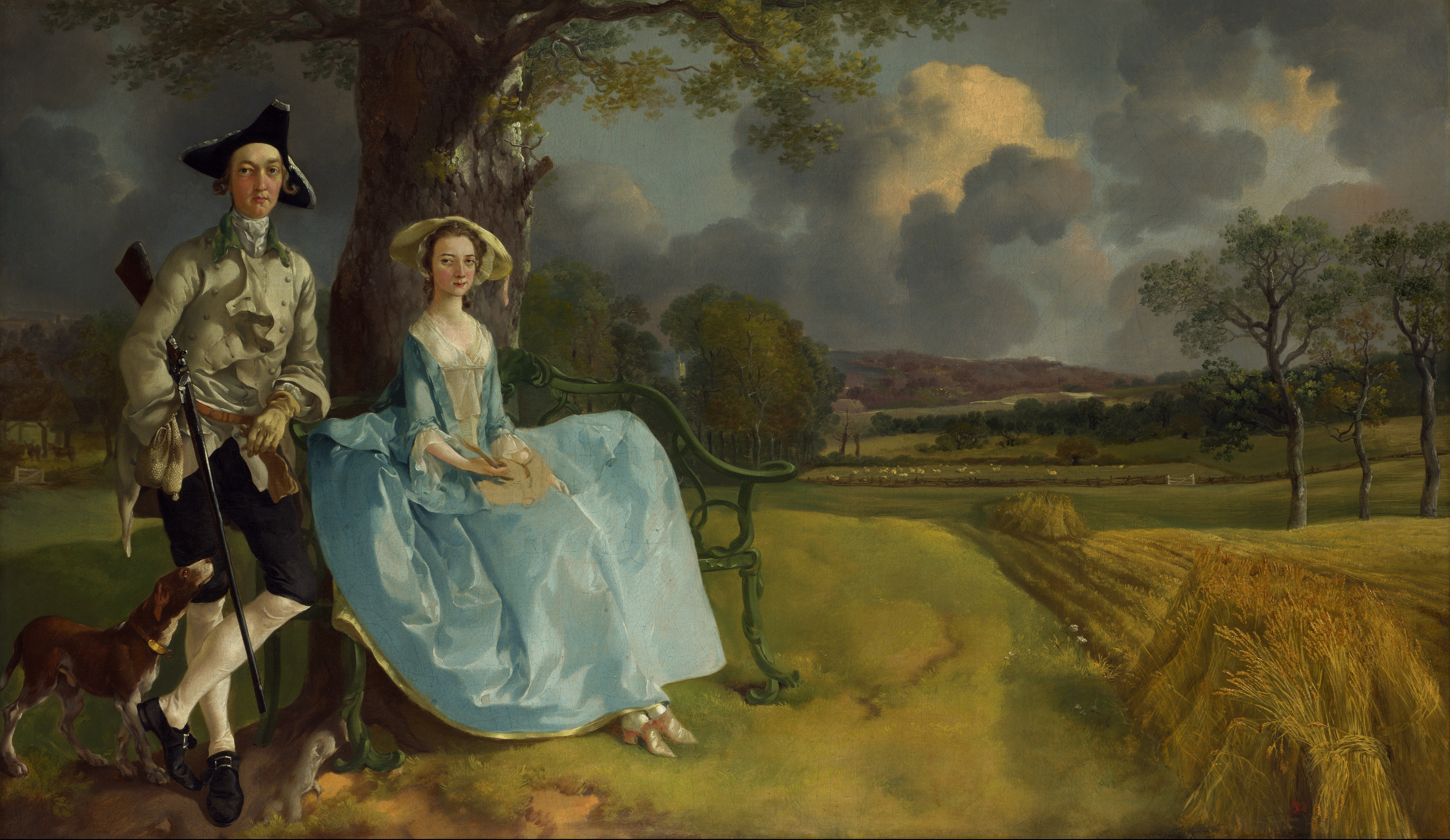
Mr and Mrs Andrews (c. 1750), National Gallery

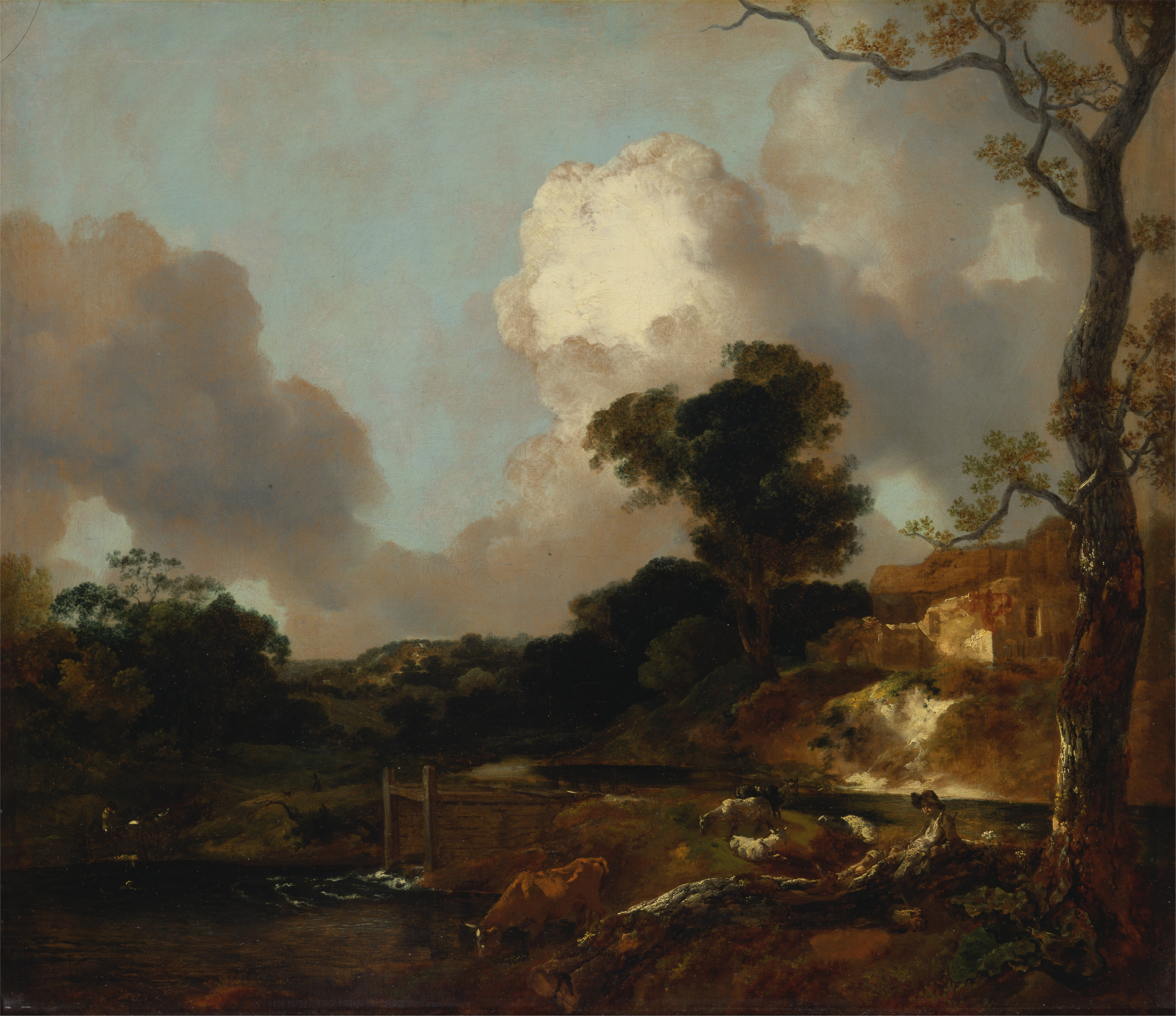
Landscape with Stream and Weir (c. 1750–53), Yale Center for British Art

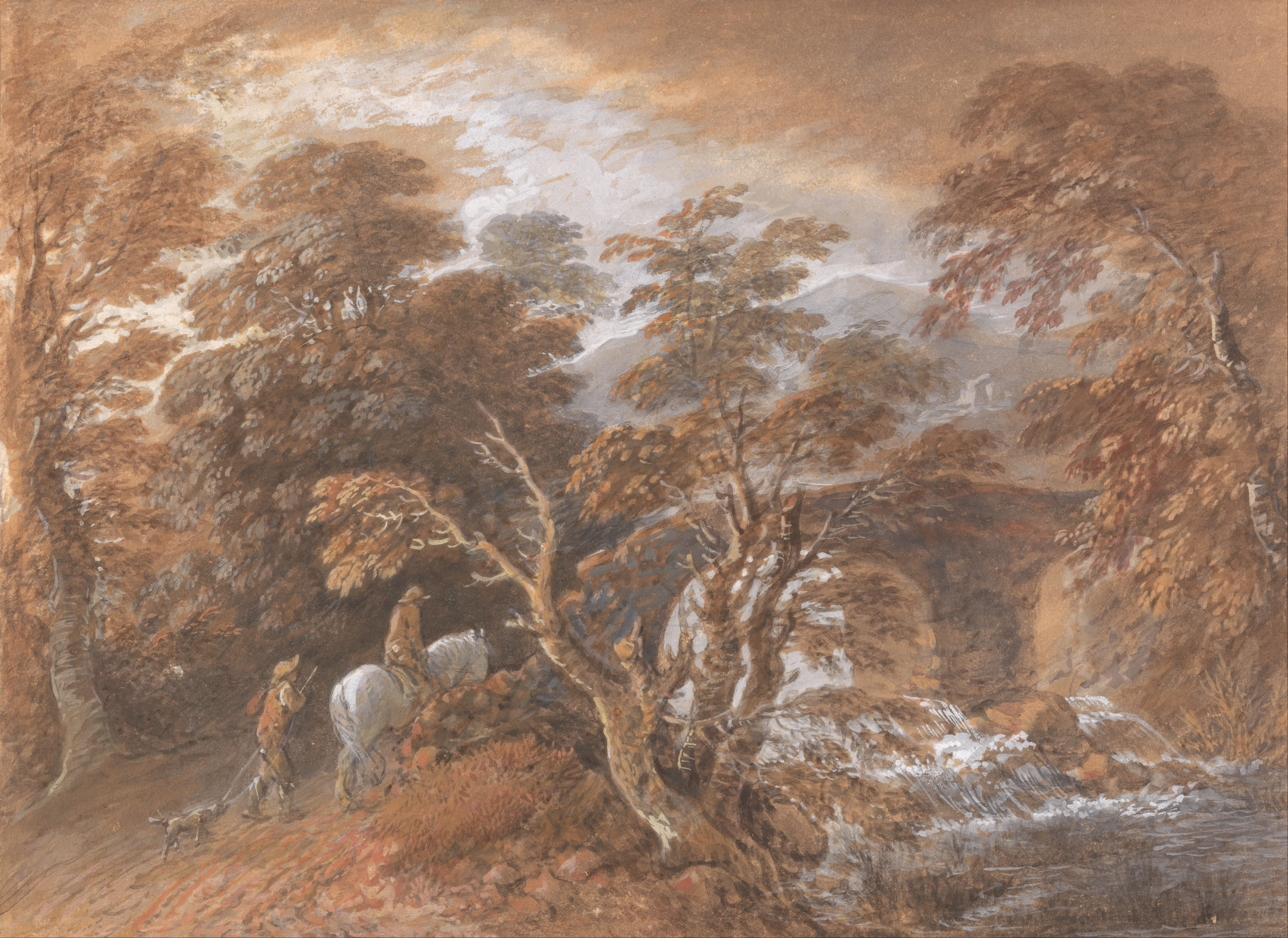
Hilly Landscape with Figures Approaching a Bridge (c. 1763), watercolour, Yale Center for British Art

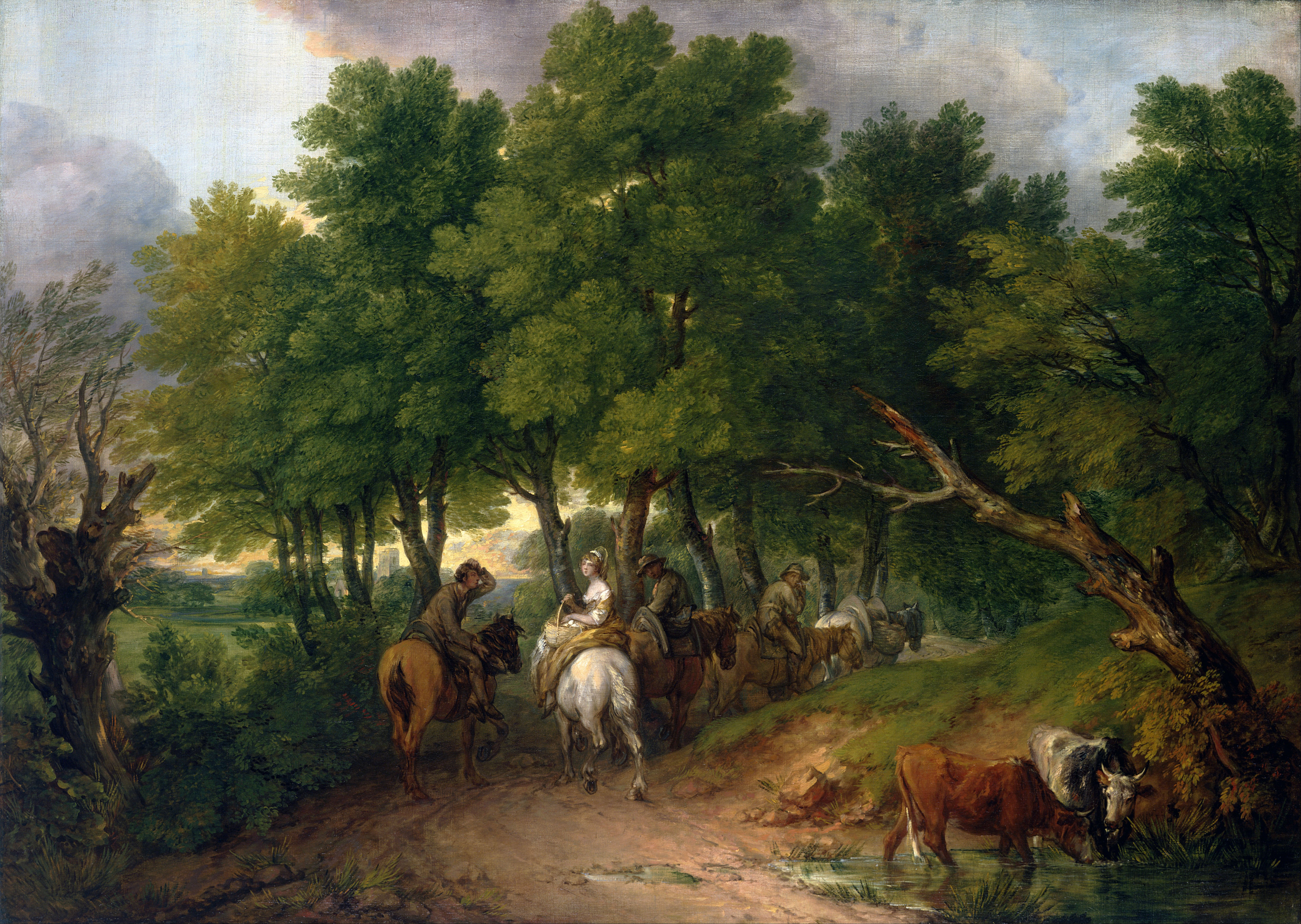
Road from Market (c. 1767–68), Toledo Museum of Art

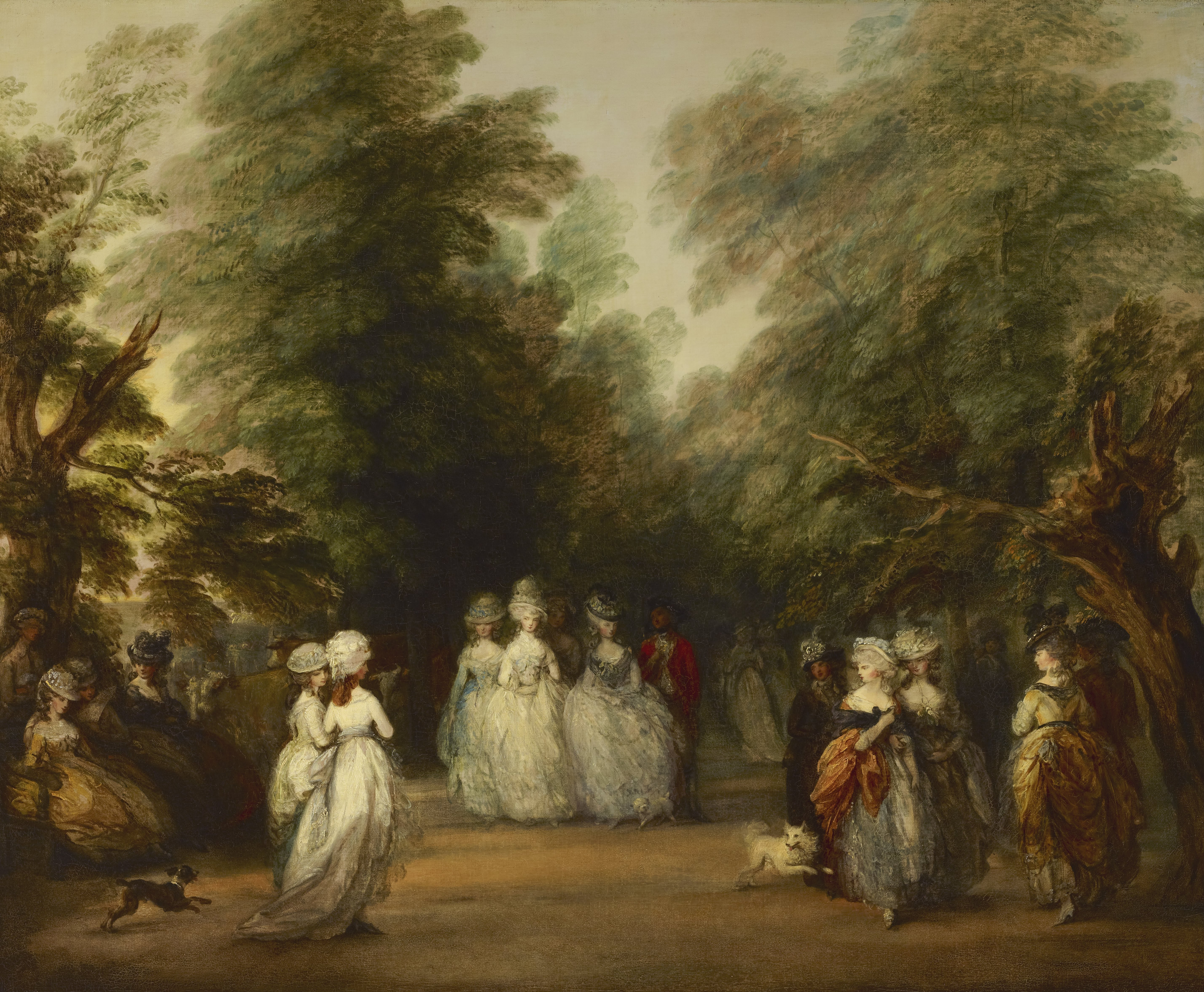
The Mall in St. James's Park (1783), Frick Collection

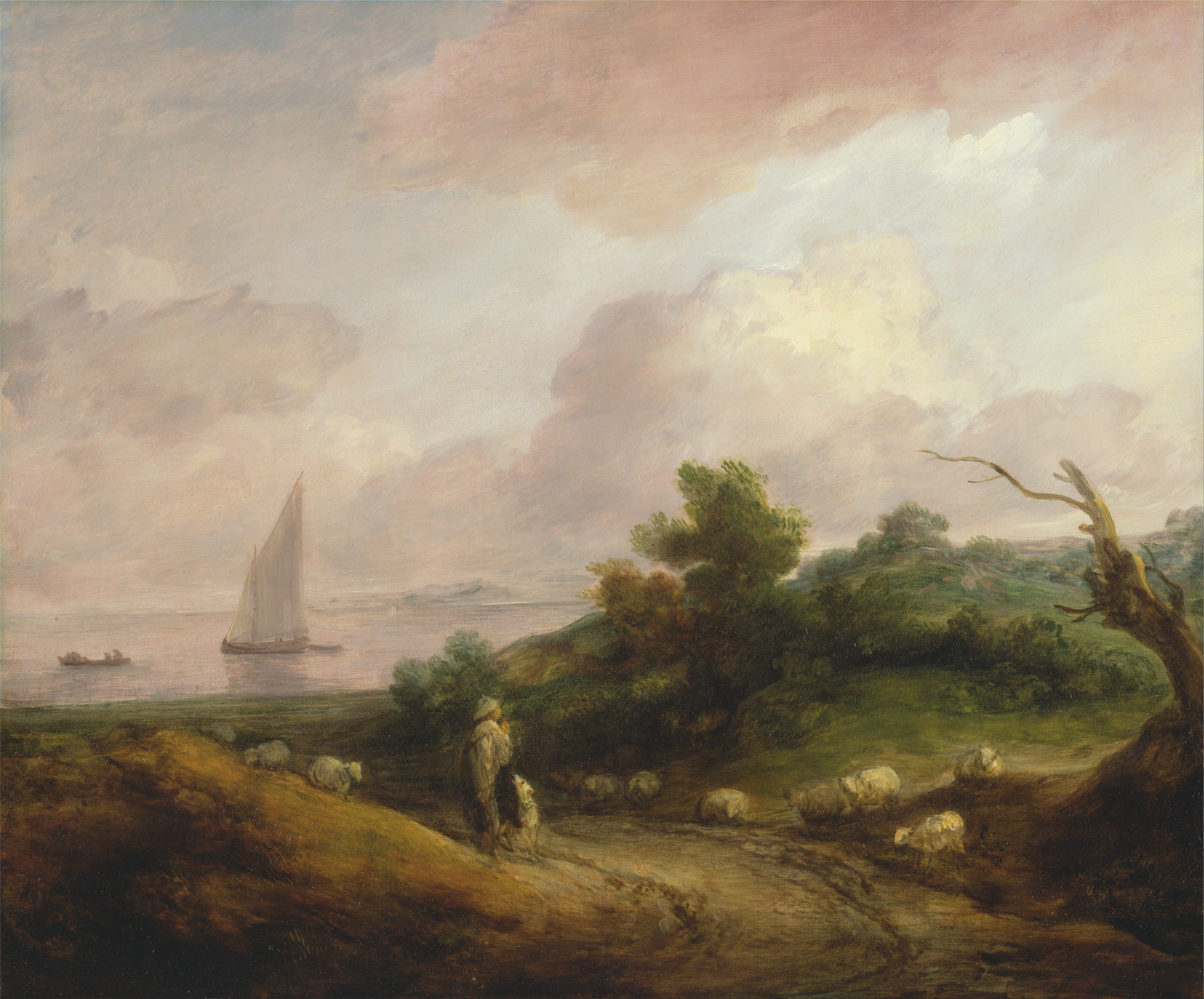
Coastal Landscape with a Shepherd and His Flock (c. 1783–84), Yale Center for British Art

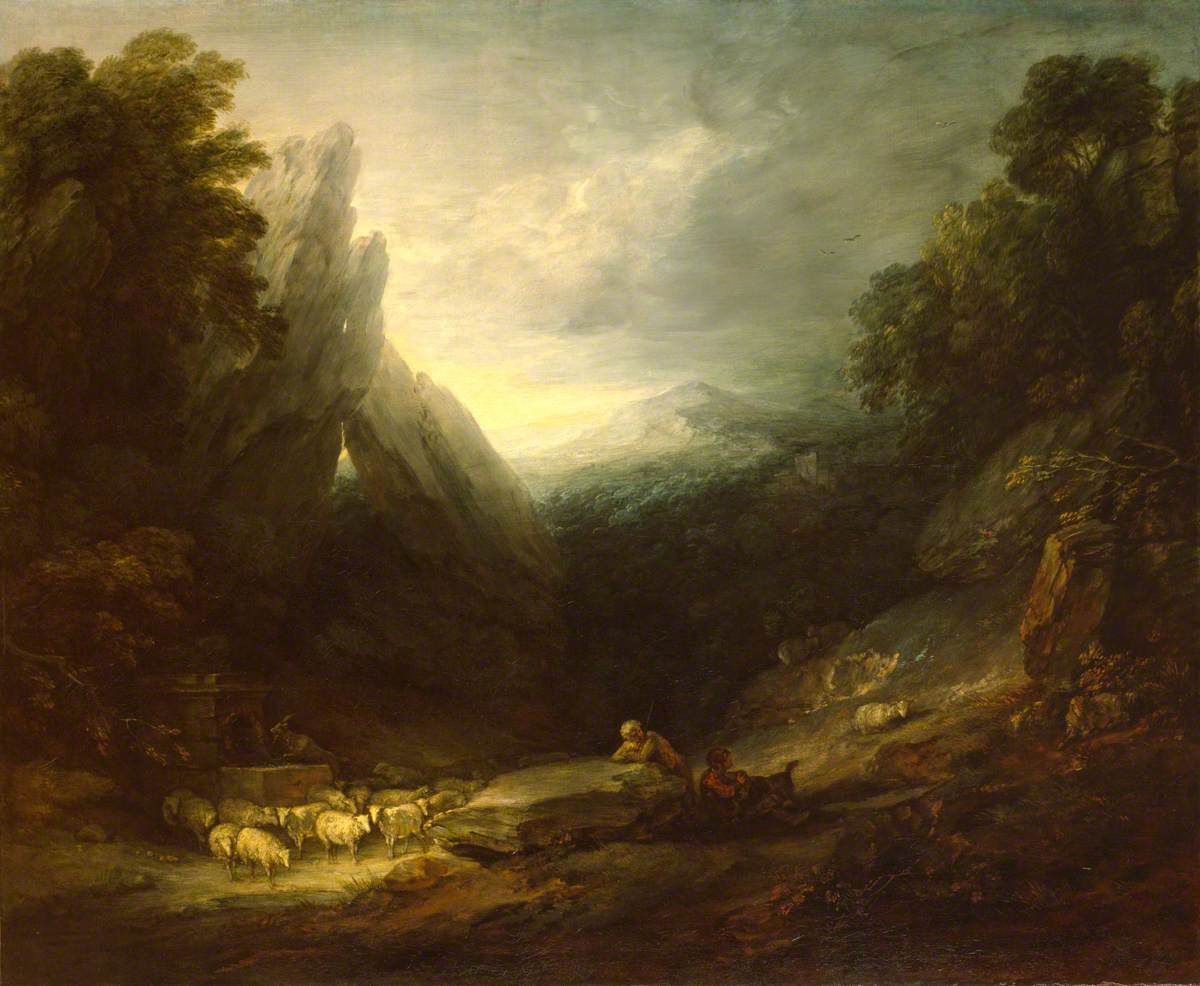
Romantic Landscape with Sheep at a Spring (1783), Royal Academy of Arts

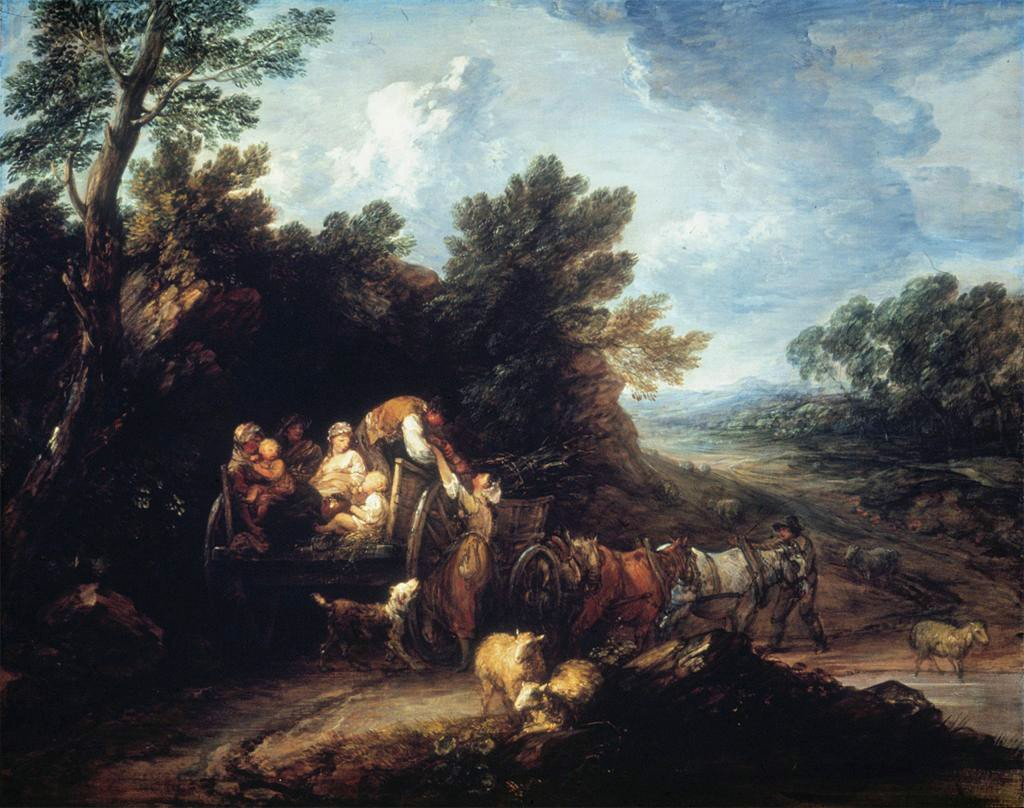
The Harvest Wagon (1784), Art Gallery of Ontario

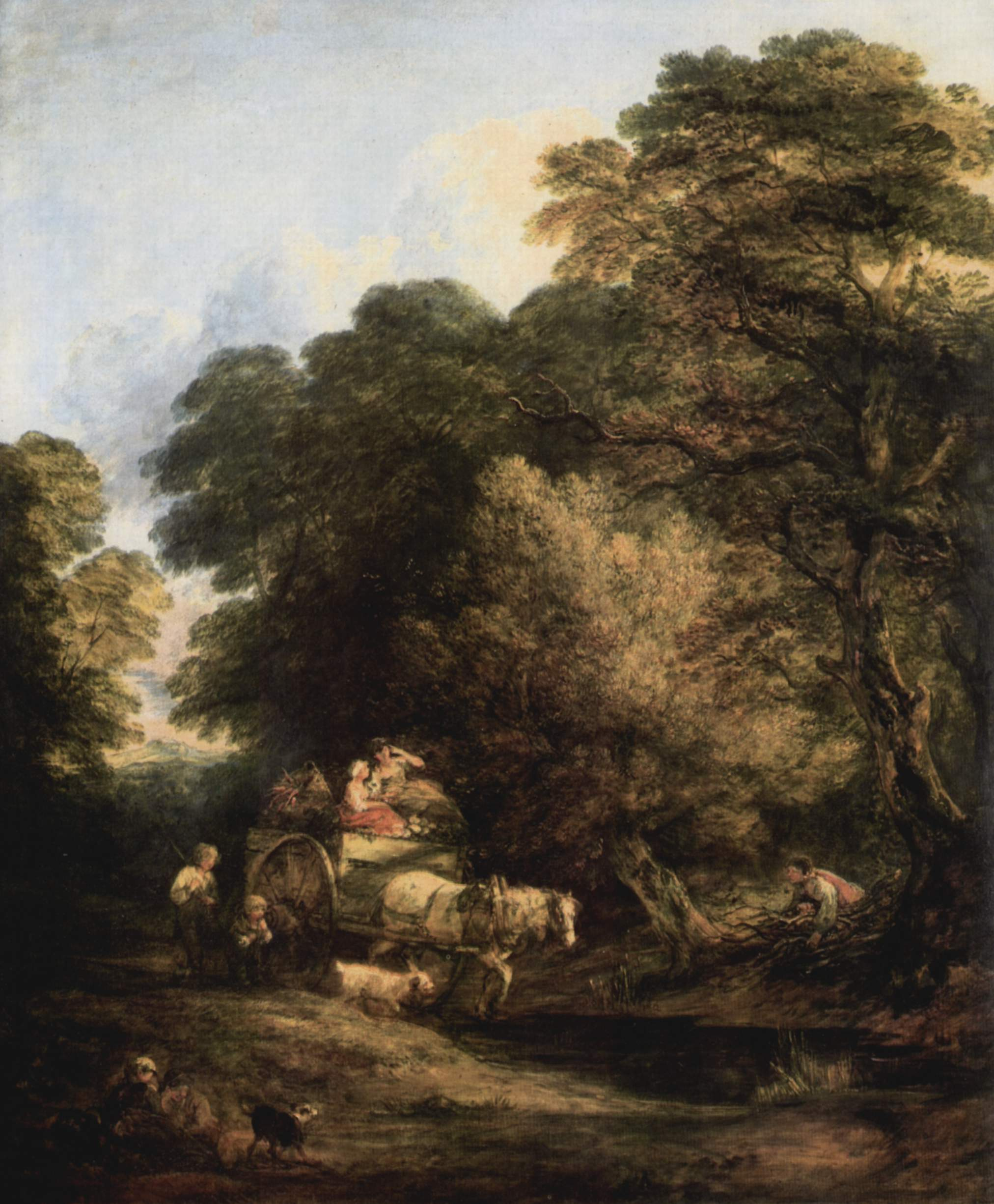
The Market Cart (1786), National Gallery

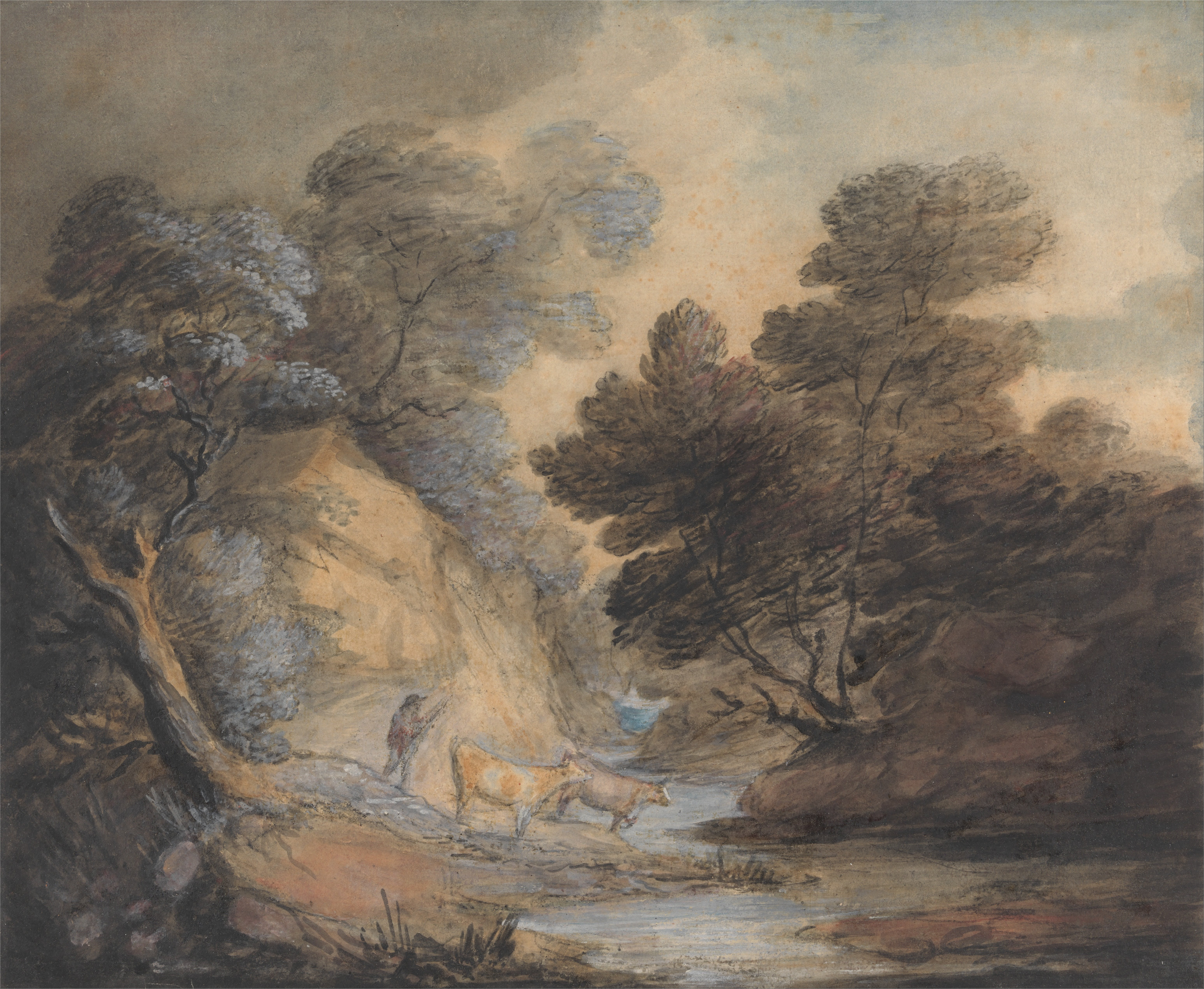
River Landscape (undated), Yale Center for British Art

== See also ==
- Gainsborough's House
- Fancy picture
- Rococo
- Humphrey Gainsborough
- Holywells Park
