= 1784 in art =

Events from the year 1784 in art.

== Events ==
- April 26 – The Royal Academy Exhibition of 1784 opens at Somerset House in London. After a dispute Thomas Gainsborough's paintings are withdrawn and he refuses to exhibit at the academy again for the remainder of his career
- July 30 – Adolf Ulrik Wertmüller is elected to the Académie royale de peinture et de sculpture in Paris.
- date unknown – Thomas Chippendale, the younger, begins exhibiting his paintings at the Royal Academy.

== Works ==
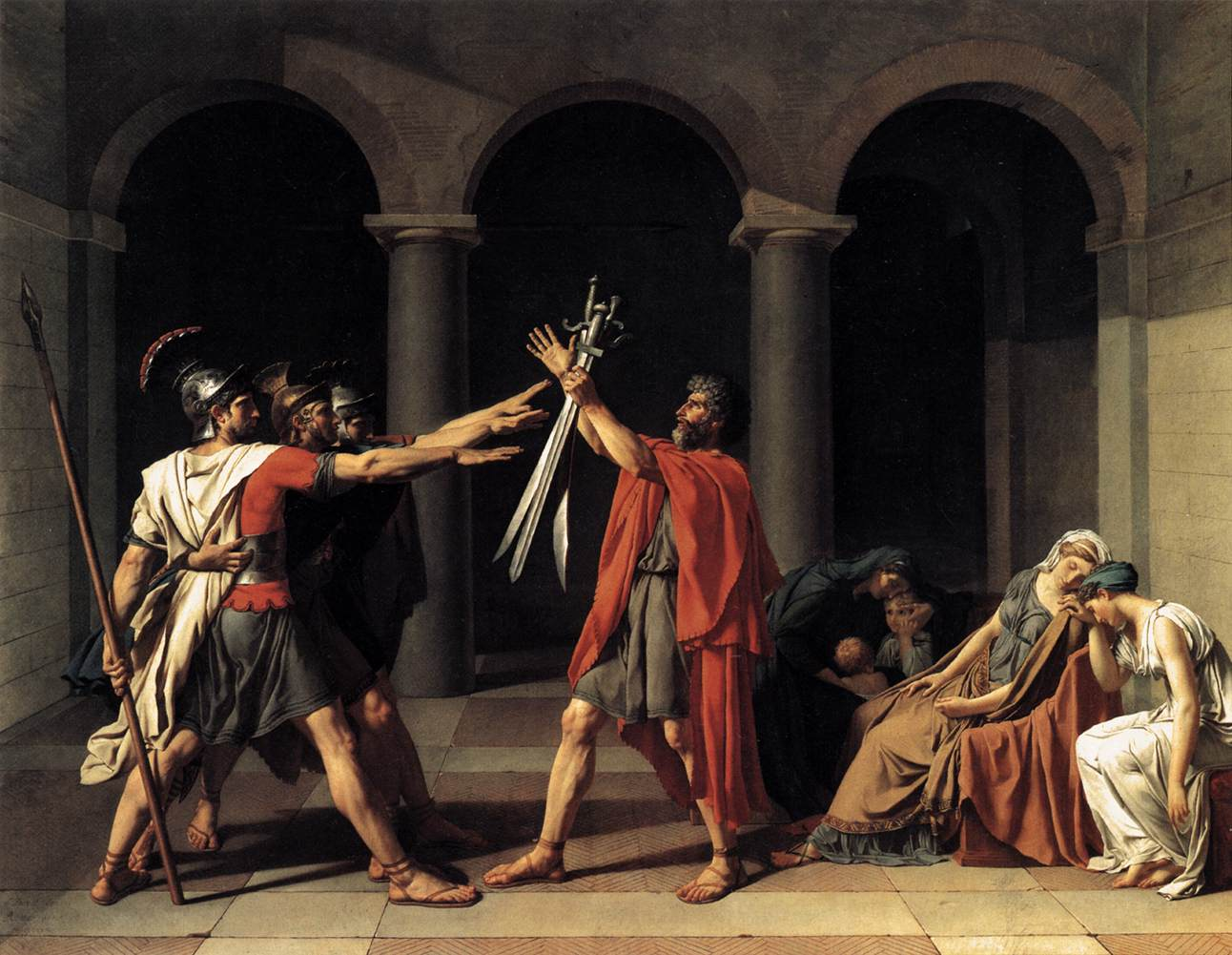
Jacques-Louis David – Oath of the Horatii

- John Bacon – seated sculpture of Sir William Blackstone (Codrington Library, All Souls College, Oxford, England)
- James Barry – The Progress of Human Culture (completed series in Great Room of Society for the Encouragement of Arts, Manufactures and Commerce in London)
- Antonio Carnicero – Ascent of Monsieur Bouclé's Montgolfier Balloon in the Gardens of Aranjuez
- Élisabeth Vigée Le Brun – Portrait of the Comte de Vaudreuil
- Jacques-Louis David – Oath of the Horatii (Musée du Louvre, Paris)
- Jean Germain Drouais – Christ and the Canaanite Woman
- Joseph Duplessis –Portrait of Joseph-Marie Vien
- Henry Fuseli – Lady Macbeth Sleepwalking
- Thomas Gainsborough
  - Portrait of the Earl of Buckinghamshire and his wife Caroline Connolly
  - Frances Browne, Mrs John Douglas
  - The Baillie Family
  - Portrait of Lord Rawdon
  - The Three Eldest Princesses
- Louise Élisabeth Vigée Le Brun
  - Two portraits of the Comte de Vaudreuil
  - Portrait of Charles Alexandre de Calonne
- Philip James de Loutherbourg – Dovedale in Derbyshire
- James Northcote – Portrait of Sir Ralph Milbanke
- Charles Willson Peale
  - General Benjamin Lincoln
  - Washington, Lafayette & Tilghman at Yorktown (the "Annapolis portrait")
- John Francis Rigaud – Samson and Delilah
- George Romney – Sir William Hamilton
- Gilbert Stuart – Portrait of Joshua Reynolds
- John Webber – Death of Cook
- Johann Zoffany – Portrait of Claud Alexander with his brother Boyd, attended by an Indian servant

== Births ==
- January 21 – Peter De Wint, English landscape painter (died 1849)
- February 29 – Leo von Klenze, German neoclassicist architect, painter and writer (died 1864)
- May 4 – Rubens Peale, American artist and museum director (died 1865)
- June 4 – François Rude, French sculptor (died 1855)
- July 11 – Paul Joseph Gabriël, Dutch painter and sculptor (died 1833)
- September 23 – Peter von Cornelius, German painter (died 1867)
- October – Sarah Biffen, disabled English painter (died 1850)
- November 3 – Antonín Mánes, Czech painter (died 1843)
- November 21 – Gustaf Wilhelm Finnberg, Finnish painter (died 1833)
- November 28 – Claude Victor de Boissieu, French artist and local politician (died 1868)
- December 26 – Antoni Brodowski, Polish Neo-classicist painter and pedagogue (died 1832)
- date unknown
  - John Cox Dillman Engleheart, English miniature painter (died 1862)
  - William Essex, English enamel-painter (died 1869)
  - Charles Gough, English landscape artist (died 1805)
  - Ernestine Panckoucke, French botanical illustrator and flower painter (died 1860)
  - Stepan Pimenov, Russian sculptor (died 1833)
  - Jacopo Tumicelli, Italian portrait miniature painter (died 1825)

== Deaths ==
- January 17 – Yosa Buson, Japanese poet and painter (born 1716)
- April 10 – Simon Fokke, Dutch designer, etcher and engraver (born 1712)
- May 29 – George Barret Sr., Irish landscape artist best known for his portraits of the British countryside (born 1730)
- July 15 – Johann Baptist Straub, German Rococo sculptor (born 1704)
- August 10 – Allan Ramsay, Scottish portrait-painter (born 1713)
- August 14 – Nathaniel Hone, British portrait painter (born 1718)
- September 7 – Andrea Casali – Italian painter of the Rococo period (born 1705)
- September 15 – Nicolas Bernard Lépicié, French painter (born 1735)
- October 29 – Giuseppe Zais, Italian painter of landscapes (vedutisti) (born 1709)
- date unknown
  - Antonio Beltrami, Italian painter (born 1724)
  - Giuseppe Bottani, Italian painter (born 1717)
  - Stefano Torelli, Italian painter of altar-pieces and ceiling decorations (born 1712)
- probable – John Foldsone, English portrait painter (born unknown)
