= 1833 in art =

Events from the year 1833 in art.

== Events ==
- January – Honoré Daumier is released from prison after serving a 6-month term for caricaturing King Louis-Philippe of France as Gargantua in La Caricature.
- 1 March – The Salon of 1833 opens at the Louvre in Paris

== Works ==
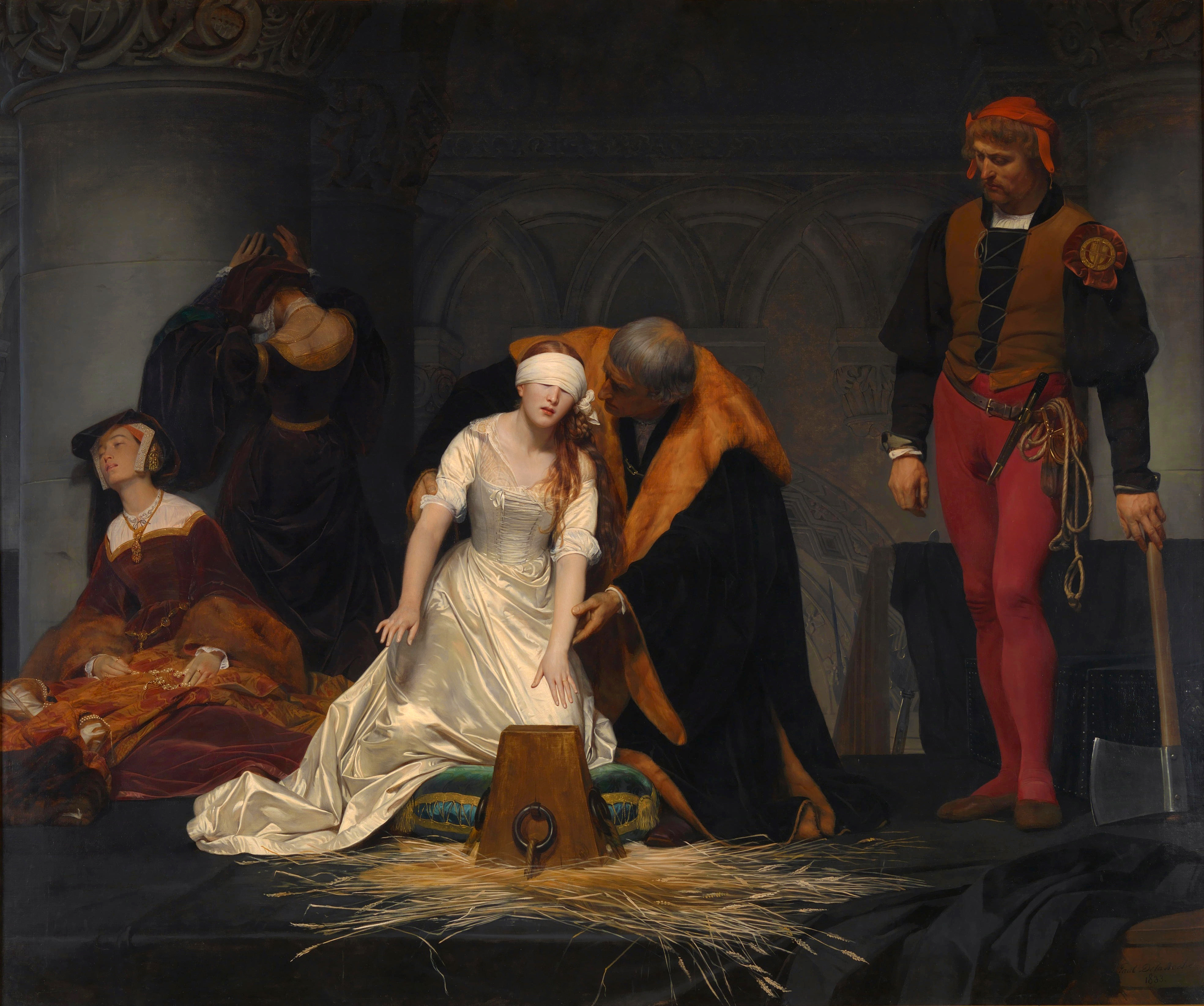
Delaroche – The Execution of Lady Jane Grey

- William Allan – The Murder of David Rizzio
- Karl Bryullov – The Last Day of Pompeii
- Thomas Cole
  - Scene from "Manfred"
  - The Titan's Goblet
- John Constable – The Cottage in a Cornfield
- Alexandre-Gabriel Decamps – The Defeat of the Cimbri
- Hippolyte Delaroche – The Execution of Lady Jane Grey
- William Etty – Britomart Redeems Faire Amoret
- Caspar David Friedrich – Easter Morning
- Francis Grant – A Meet of the Fife Hounds
- Francesco Hayez – Lot and His Daughters
- Hiroshige – The Fifty-three Stations of the Tōkaidō (publication begins)
- George Jones – Godiva Preparing to Ride through Coventry
- Orest Kiprensky – Portrait of Bertel Thorvaldsen
- Edwin Landseer
  - The Hunted Stag
  - A Jack in Office
- Samuel Morse – Gallery of the Louvre
- Nicolaas Pieneman – The Battle of Bautersem
- David Roberts
  - The Castle of Alcalá de Guadaíra
  - The Torre del Oro
- François Rude – Young Neapolitan Fisherboy Playing with a Tortoise (sculpture)
- Hendrik Scheffer – Portrait of Armand Carrel
- Martin Archer Shee – Portrait of William IV
- Clarkson Stanfield
  - Orford
  - Venice from the Dogana
- J.M.W. Turner
  - Bridge of Sighs, Ducal Palace and Custom House
  - Quillebeuf, Mouth of the Seine
  - Rotterdam Ferry-Boat
  - Van Goyen Looking Out for a Subject
- Horace Vernet
  - The Arab Tale-Teller
  - Portrait of Bertel Thorvaldsen
- Matthew Cotes Wyatt – Bashaw, The Faithful Friend of Man Trampling under Foot his most Insidious Enemy (coloured marble)

== Births ==
- April 17 – George Vicat Cole, English painter (died 1893)
- May 3 – Philip Hermogenes Calderon, French-born painter (died 1898)
- May 22 – Félix Bracquemond, French painter and etcher (died 1914)
- August 22 – Odoardo Borrani, Italian painter associated with the Macchiaioli (died 1905)
- August 28 – Edward Burne-Jones, English pre-Raphaelite painter and designer (died 1898)
- November 12 – George Paul Chalmers, Scottish painter (killed 1878)
- Rosalie Sjöman, Swedish photographer (died 1919)

== Deaths ==
- January 30 – Augustin Dupré, French engraver of French currency and medals (born 1748)
- April 3 (March 22 O.S.) – Stepan Pimenov, Russian sculptor (born 1784)
- April 7 – Jacques Réattu, French painter and winner of the grand prix de Rome (born 1760)
- April 8 – Raffaello Sanzio Morghen, Italian engraver (born 1758)
- May – Philippe Auguste Hennequin, French painter (born 1763)
- June 28 – Gustaf Wilhelm Finnberg, Finnish painter (born 1784)
- July 5 – Nicéphore Niépce, French inventor who created some of the earliest photographs (born 1765)
- July 6 – Pierre-Narcisse Guérin, French painter (born 1774)
- July 11 – Paul Joseph Gabriël, Dutch painter and sculptor (born 1784)
- October 11 – Ernst Fries, German painter (born 1801)
- November 27 – Philip Reinagle, English animal, landscape and botanical painter (born 1749)
- December 3 – Adam Buck, Irish-born neo-classical portraitist and miniature painter (born 1759)
- date unknown – Antoine Jean-Baptiste Thomas, French painter and lithographer (born 1791)
