= Portrait of the Earl of Buckinghamshire =

Painting by Thomas Gainsborough

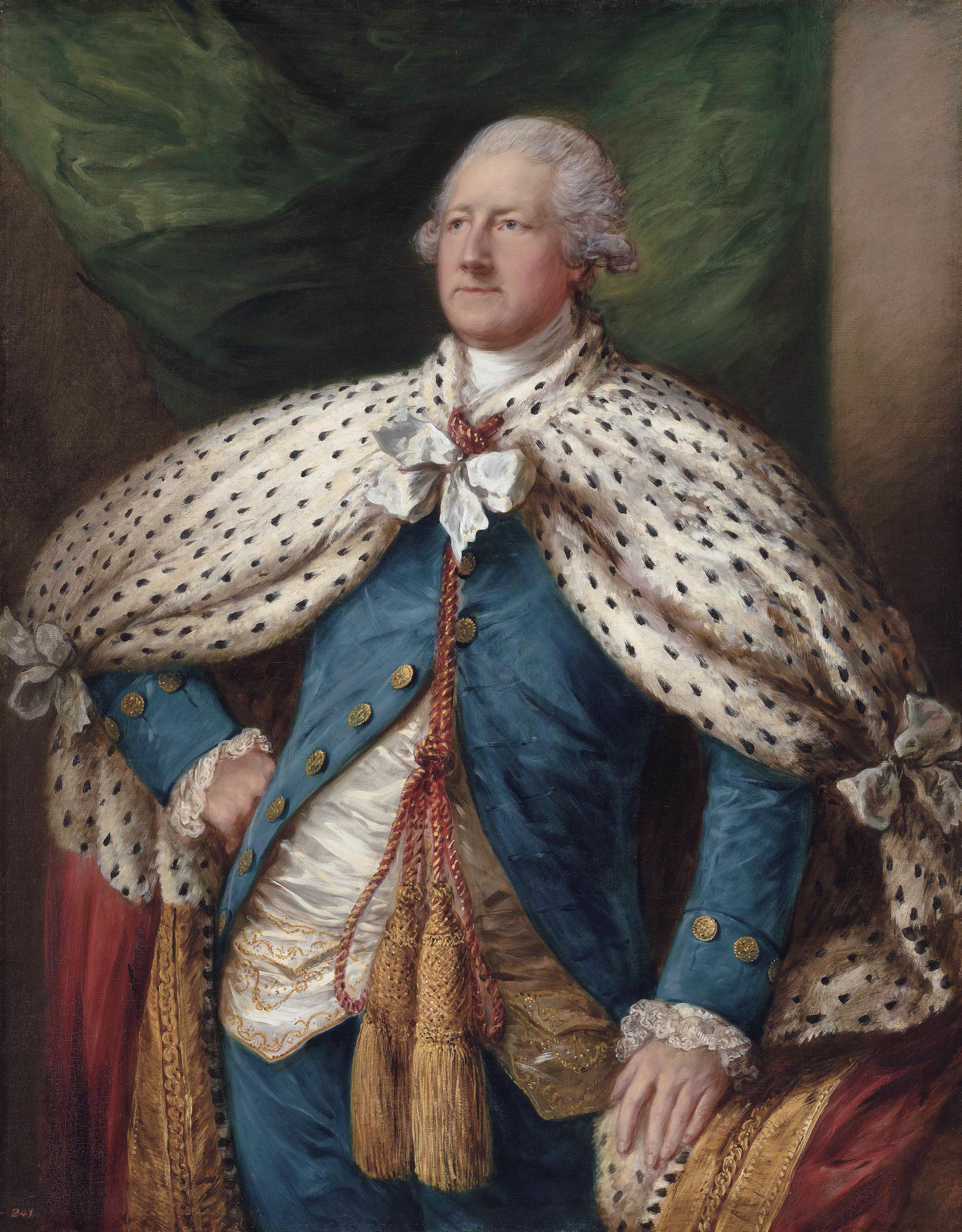
- Artist: Thomas Gainsborough
- Year: 1784
- Type: Oil on canvas, portrait painting
- Dimensions: 234 cm × 145.5 cm (92 in × 57.3 in)
- Location: Blickling Hall, Norfolk

Portrait of the Earl of Buckinghamshire is an oil on canvas portrait painting by the English painter Thomas Gainsborough, from 1784. It depicts the British diplomat and politician John Hobart, 2nd Earl of Buckinghamshire, who served as the British ambassador to Russia from 1762 to 1765 and Lord Lieutenant of Ireland from 1776 to 1780.

== History and description ==
His daughter Amelia married Robert Stewart, Viscount Castlereagh, the British Secretary of War and Foreign Secretary during the Napoleonic Wars. He is shown at full-length in court dress and the ermine robes of a peer. Gainsborough also produced a companion portrait featuring his Irish wife Caroline Connolly.

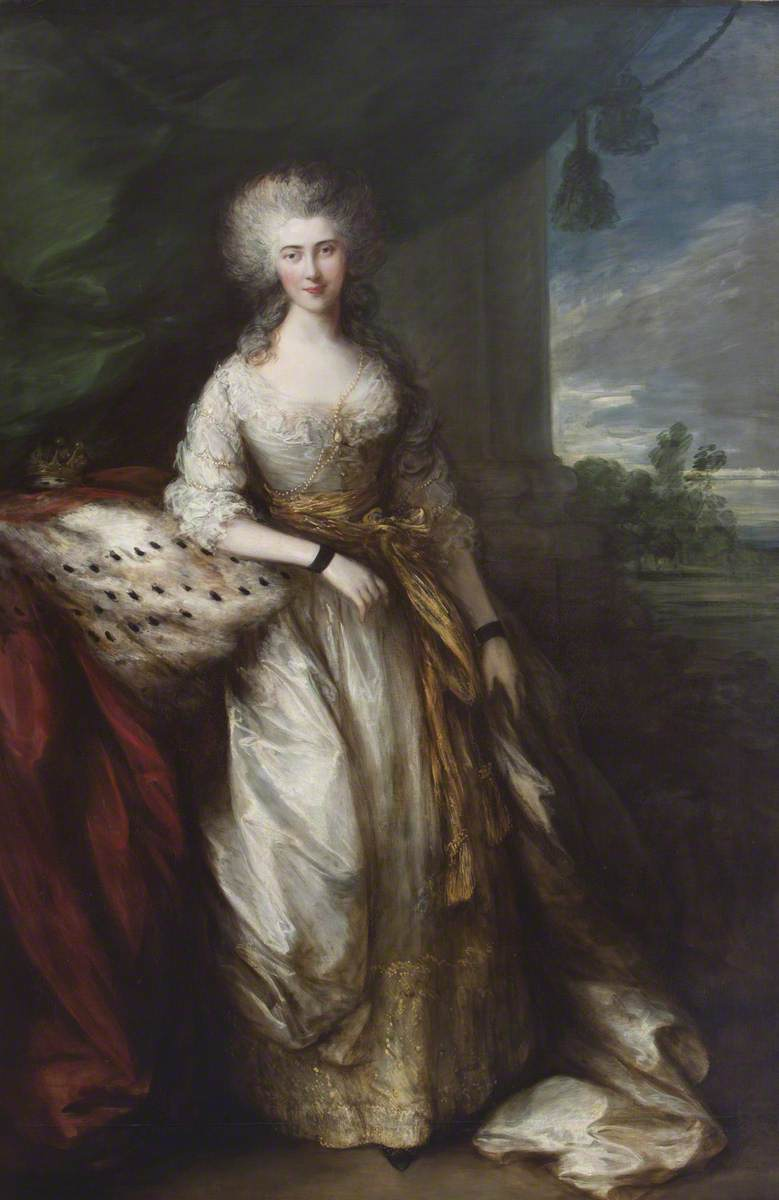
Companion piece featuring the Earl's wife Caroline.

Gainsborough planned to display the painting at the Royal Academy Exhibition of 1784 at Somerset House in London. However following a dispute with the committee, he withdrew this and other paintings and never exhibited with the Royal Academy again. The painting hangs in the Earl's historic residence of Blickling Hall, in Norfolk.

== Bibliography ==
- Bew, John. Castlereagh: A Life Oxford University Press, 2012.
- Hamilton, James. Gainsborough: A Portrait. Hachette UK, 2017.
