= The Baillie Family =

Painting by Thomas Gainsborough

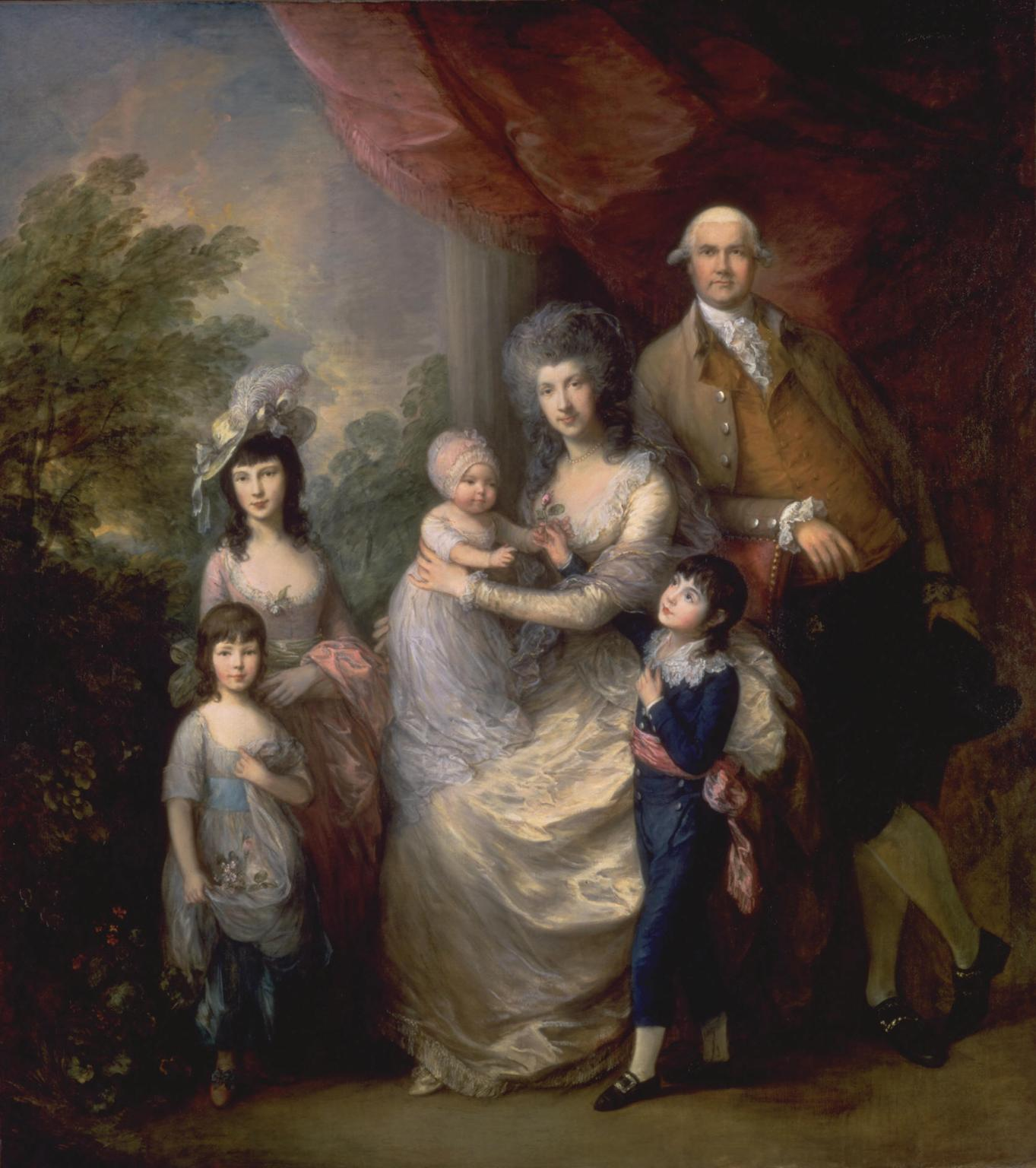
- Artist: Thomas Gainsborough
- Year: 1784
- Type: Oil on canvas, portrait painting
- Dimensions: 250 cm × 227.8 cm (98 in × 89.7 in)
- Location: Tate Britain; London

The Baillie Family is an oil on canvas portrait painting by the British artist Thomas Gainsborough, from 1784. It is held in the Tate Britain, in London, having been bequeathed to the nation in 1868.

== History and description ==
A group portrait, it depicts the family of the Scottish merchant and politician James Baillie. The family were wealthy through their involvement in the West Indian plantation system and ownership of slaves. They lived at Ealing Grove mansion, then in Middlesex.

This was one of the works that Gainsborough was due to show at the Royal Academy Exhibition of 1784 at Somerset House in London. Due to a dispute over the hanging of another of his paintings, The Three Eldest Princesses, all of Gainsborough's submissions, including The Baillie Family were withdrawn from display and he did not exhibit at the Royal Academy for the remainder of his career.

== Bibliography ==
- Hamilton, James. Gainsborough: A Portrait. Hachette UK, 2017.
- Lovell, Margareta L. Art in a Season of Revolution: painters, Artisans, and Patrons in Early America. University of Pennsylvania Press, 2007.
