= Portrait of Lord Moira =

Painting by Sir Joshua Reynolds

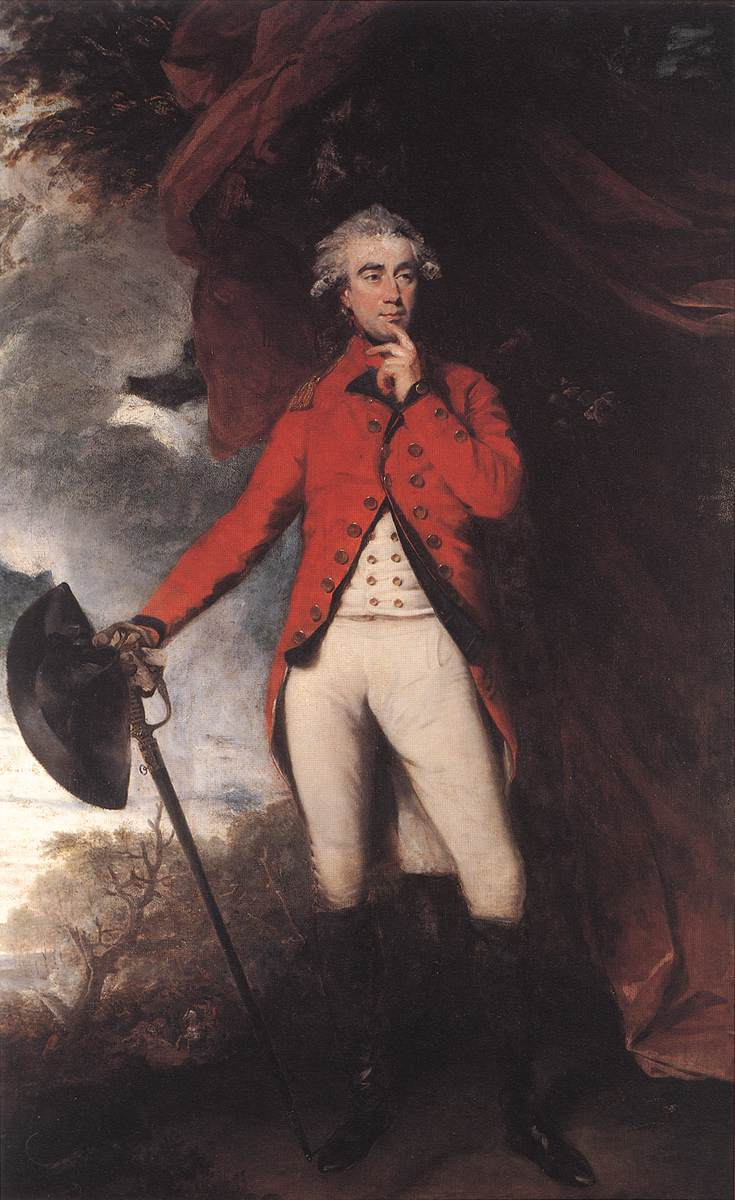
- Artist: Joshua Reynolds
- Year: 1789–1790
- Type: Oil on canvas, portrait
- Dimensions: 240 cm × 148 cm (94.6 in × 58.3 in)
- Location: Hillsborough Castle, Royal Collection, County Down

Portrait of Lord Moira is a portrait painting by the English artist Sir Joshua Reynolds of the Irish soldier and politician Francis Rawdon-Hastings, 1st Marquess of Hastings, then known as the Earl of Moira.

A member of the Protestant Ascendancy, Moira served in the British Army during the American War of Independence. He subsequently became known as a friend of the young George, Prince of Wales. In 1806, he served in the Ministry of All the Talents as Master General of the Ordnance, the senior military position in the cabinet. In 1812, during the Regency era Moira was considered a prospective Prime Minister by George, now Prince Regent, but was unable to form a compromise cabinet between Whigs and Tories. Instead in 1813, he accepted the lesser but lucrative position of Governor-General of India which he held for a decade.

Begun in 1789 and finished by the next year, it was one of the last times Reynolds directly depicted a sitter due to his failing eyesight. A full-length portrait, it was exhibited at the Royal Academy Exhibition of 1790 at Somerset House. It was commissioned by the sitter as a gift for Frederick, Duke of York. On York's death in 1827 it was acquired by his brother George IV. Today it is in the Royal Collection and hangs in the Red Room of Hillsborough Castle in County Down, Moira's native county.

== See also ==
- Portrait of Lord Rawdon, a 1784 painting by Thomas Gainsborough

== Bibliography ==
- Blunt, Anthony. The Pictures in the Collection of Her Majesty the Queen: The later Italian pictures. Phaidon, 1969.
- Hudson, Derek. Sir Joshua Reynolds: A Personal Study. G. Bles, 1958.
- Hutchinson, Martin. Lord Liverpool: Britain's Greatest Prime Minister. Lutterworth Press, 2020
- Postle, Edward (ed.) Joshua Reynolds: The Creation of Celebrity. Harry N. Abrams, 2005.
