= The Salmon Leap, Leixlip =

Painting by Francis Wheatley

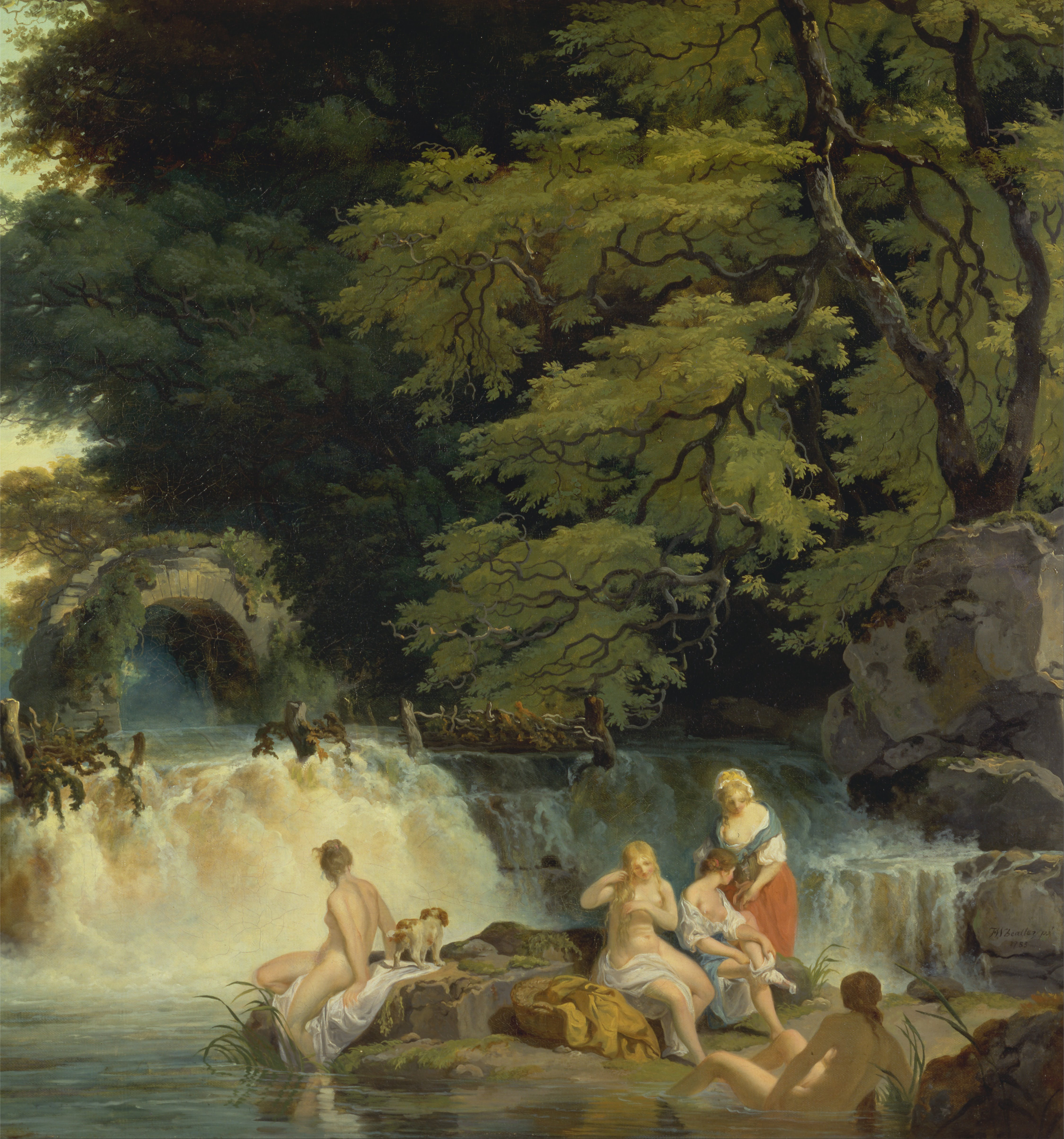
- Artist: Francis Wheatley
- Year: 1783
- Type: Oil on canvas, landscape painting
- Dimensions: 67.6 cm × 64.8 cm (26.6 in × 25.5 in)
- Location: Yale Center for British Art, Connecticut

The Salmon Leap, Leixlip is a 1783 oil painting by the British artist Francis Wheatley. Combining landscape and genre painting, it depicts the waterfall on the River Liffey at Leixlip in County Kildare. Young women or, more fancifully, nymphs are shown bathing in the nude. The English Wheatley settled and worked on Ireland for several years, producing history paintings such as The Dublin Volunteers on College Green as well as views of the Irish countryside. The work was displayed at the Royal Academy Exhibition of 1784 at Somerset House in London. Today the painting is in the Yale Center for British Art in Connecticut, having been acquired as part of the Paul Mellon Collection.

== Bibliography ==
- Baetjer, Katharine & Rosenthal, Michael. Glorious Nature: British Landscape Painting, 1750-1850. Hudson Hills Press, 1993.
- Monkhouse, Christopher P., Fitzpatrick, Leslie & Laffan, William (ed.) Ireland: Crossroads of Art and Design, 1690-1840. Art Institute of Chicago, 2015.
- Webster, Mary. Francis Wheatley. Routledge, 1970.
