= A Cottage in Patterdale, Westmoreland =

Painting by Philip James de Loutherbourg

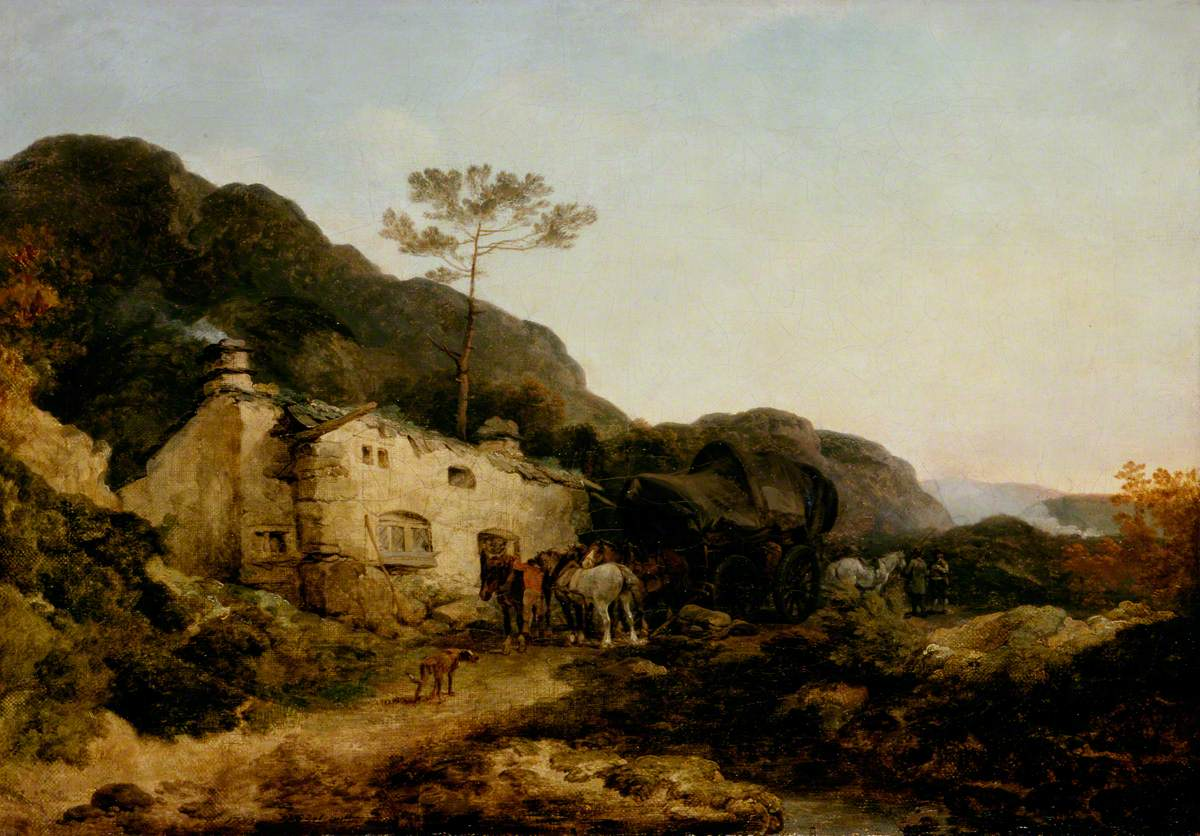
- Artist: Philip James de Loutherbourg
- Year: 1783
- Type: Oil on canvas, landscape painting
- Dimensions: 39.5 cm × 57.5 cm (15.6 in × 22.6 in)
- Location: Government Art Collection

A Cottage in Patterdale, Westmoreland is a 1783 landscape painting by the French artist Philip James de Loutherbourg. It depicts a cottage at Patterdale in the Lake District. Known as a pioneer of Romanticism, Loutherbourg moved and settled in Britain where he was elected a member of the Royal Academy.

The painting was displayed at the Royal Academy Exhibition of 1784 at Somerset House in London along with a companion piece Skiddaw in Cumberland. Today it is part of the Government Art Collection, having been acquired in 1954.

== Bibliography ==
- Andrews, Malcolm. A Sweet View: The Making of an English Idyll. Reaktion Books, 2021.
- Preston, Lillian Elvira. Philippe Jacques de Loutherbourg: Eighteenth Century Romantic Artist and Scene Designer. University of Florida, 1977.
- Powell, Cecilia & Hebron, Stephen. Savage Grandeur and Noblest Thoughts: Discovering the Lake District 1750-1820. Wordsworth Trust, 2010.
- Roe, Sonia. Oil Paintings in Public Ownership in the Government Art Collection. Public Catalogue Foundation, 2007.
