= Sleepwalking scene =

Critically celebrated scene from Macbeth

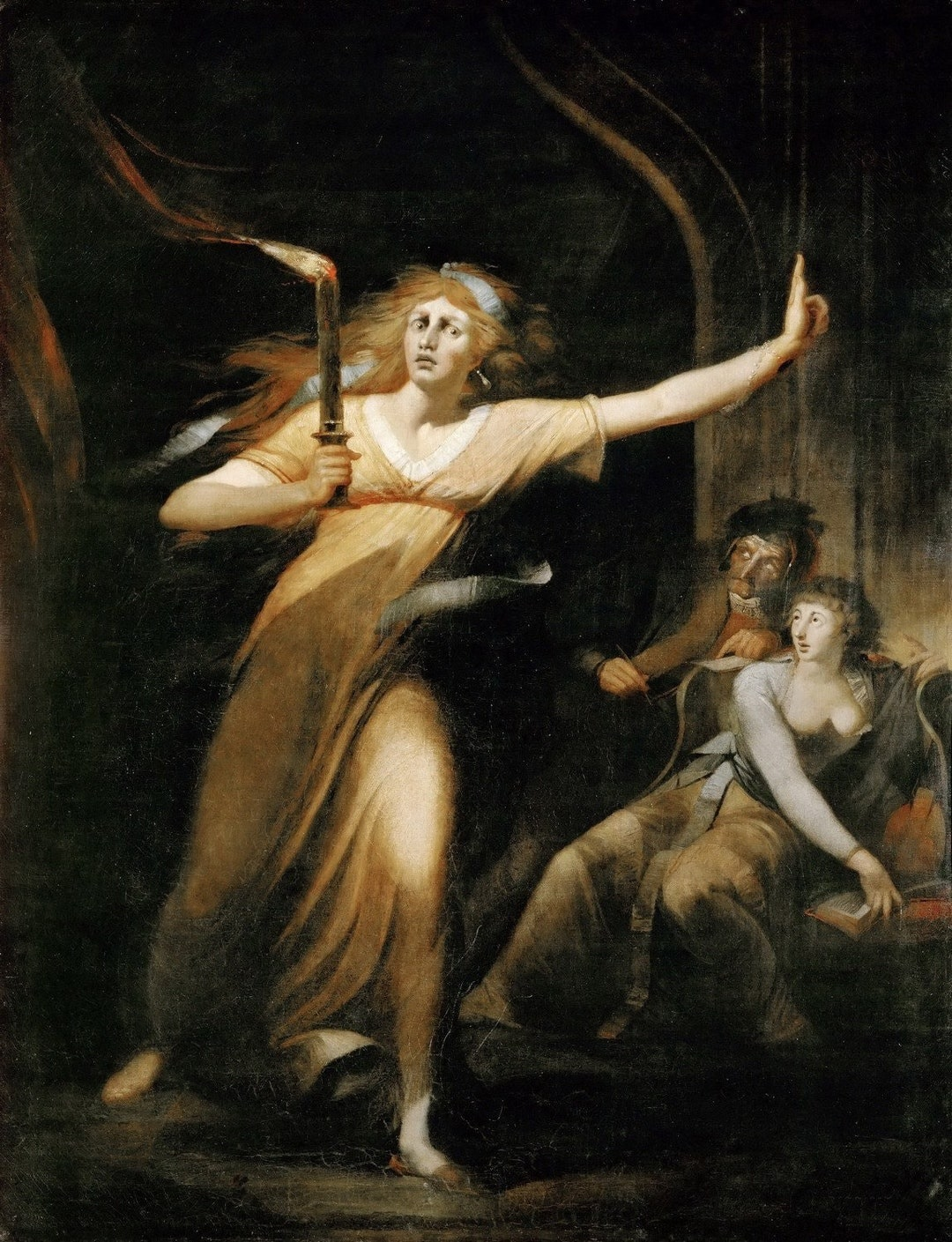
Lady Macbeth Sleepwalking by Johann Heinrich Füssli, c. 1784. (Musée du Louvre)

Act 5, Scene 1, better known as the sleepwalking scene, is a critically celebrated scene from William Shakespeare's tragedy Macbeth (1606). It deals with the guilt and madness experienced by Lady Macbeth, one of the main themes of the play.

Carrying a taper (candlestick), Lady Macbeth enters sleepwalking. The Doctor and the Gentlewoman stand aside to observe. The Doctor asks how Lady Macbeth came to have the light. The Gentlewoman replies she has ordered a light be beside her at all times (she is now afraid of the dark, having committed her crimes under its cover). Lady Macbeth rubs her hands in a washing motion. With anguish, she recalls the deaths of King Duncan, Lady Macduff, and Banquo, then leaves. The Gentlewoman and the bewildered Doctor exeunt, realizing these are the symptoms of a guilt-ridden mind. The Doctor feels Lady Macbeth is beyond his help, saying she has more need of "the divine than the physician". He orders the Gentlewoman to remove from Lady Macbeth the "means of all annoyance", anticipating she might commit suicide. Despite his warning, the audience is informed in Act 5, Scene 5, that Lady Macbeth has managed to commit suicide off-stage.

== Adaptations ==
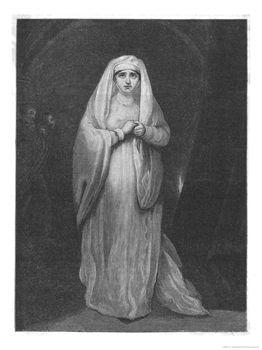
Sarah Siddons in the Sleepwalking Scene

In modern times, Francesca Annis garnered attention for her performance in Roman Polanski's film version of Macbeth (1971), in which she performs the sleepwalking soliloquy in the nude. The critic Kenneth Tynan was present when the scene was shot:

Francesca does it very sportingly and with no fuss ... though of course the set is closed, great curtains are drawn around the acting area ... and the wardrobe mistress rushes to cover Francesca with a dressing gown the instant Roman says, 'Cut'.

Throne of Blood, an adaptation of Macbeth in medieval Japan, depicts the scene as a more direct interaction between Washizu (Macbeth) and Asaji (Lady Macbeth), with him attempting to confront his wife after their servants report her to be compulsively washing her hands in a basin, only to find her completely unresponsive.
