= The Schoolmistress (painting) =

1784 painting by John Opie

- Version in the Tate Britain known as A School
- Artist: John Opie
- Year: 1784
- Type: Oil on canvas, genre painting
- Dimensions: 102.3 cm × 127 cm (40.3 in × 50 in)
- Location: Tate Britain; London

The Schoolmistress is the name of two paintings from 1784 by the British artist John Opie. Both versions show the schoolmistress with five boys and a cat; both are oil on canvas, approximately 40 inches by 50 inches, painted while Opie was living in London, at No 63 Great Queen Street.

One of the two paintings, originally titled A School but sometimes also known as The Schoolmistress, was exhibited at the Royal Academy (No 162) during the Exhibition of 1784. This version, once owned by Samuel Jones-Loyd, 1st Baron Overstone, was sold in 1823 for George Watson-Taylor MP for 90 Guineas; it was sold in 1875 by Jesse Watts-Russell MP of Ilam Park in Staffordshire for 750 Guineas, said to be the highest price ever paid for an Opie picture at the time. In 1785 it was engraved in mezzotint by Valentine Green, an indication of its popularity.

Another version, also The Schoolmistress, was owned by George Grey, 5th Earl of Stamford. It was exhibited at the Art Treasures Exhibition, Manchester 1857 as No 133. One or other of these versions was exhibited at the Grafton Gallery Exhibition of Fair Children in 1895, and the Guildhall Exhibition of French and English Painters of the Eighteenth Century in 1902.

One version, lighter, with the cat shown on the right, was bought by a Dr Earl Wood in 1930 from art dealers Spink & Son, at a cost of $7,500. Wood took it back to the United States. In 1969 it was stolen from the Wood residence in Newark, New Jersey, likely by members of the mafia. It was recovered in 2024 in St. George, Utah.

The other version – darker, with the cat on the left – was for many years part of the Loyd Collection of paintings and drawings at Lockinge near Wantage, Berkshire. Accepted in lieu of Inheritance Tax by HM Government, it was allocated to Tate Britain in 2020.
