= Dovedale in Derbyshire =

Painting by Philip James de Loutherbourg

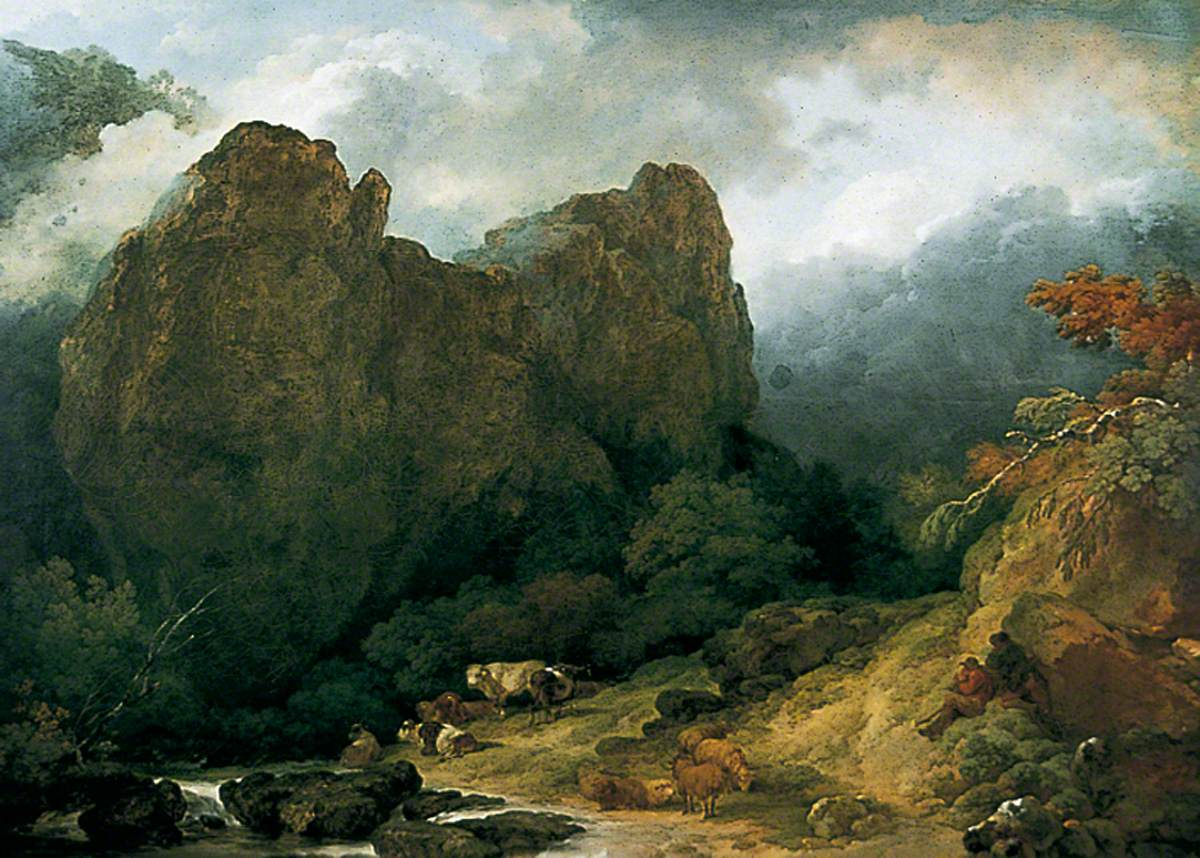
- Artist: Philip James de Loutherbourg
- Year: 1784
- Type: Oil on canvas, landscape painting
- Dimensions: 97.8 cm × 129.5 cm (38.5 in × 51.0 in)
- Location: York Art Gallery; Yorkshire

Dovedale in Derbyshire is a 1784 landscape painting by Philip James de Loutherbourg. It depicts a view in the valley of Dovedale in Derbyshire. The French-born Loutherbourg was known for his Proto-Romantic landscapes.

The work was displayed at the Royal Academy Exhibition of 1784 at Somerset House in London. Today the painting is in the collection of the York Art Gallery, having been acquired in 1961.

== Bibliography ==
- Parris, Leslie. Landscape in Britain, C. 1750-1850. Tate Gallery Publications, 2003.
- Preston, Lillian Elvira. Philippe Jacques de Loutherbourg: Eighteenth Century Romantic Artist and Scene Designer. University of Florida, 1977.
