= Royal Academy Exhibition of 1784 =

1784 art exhibition in London

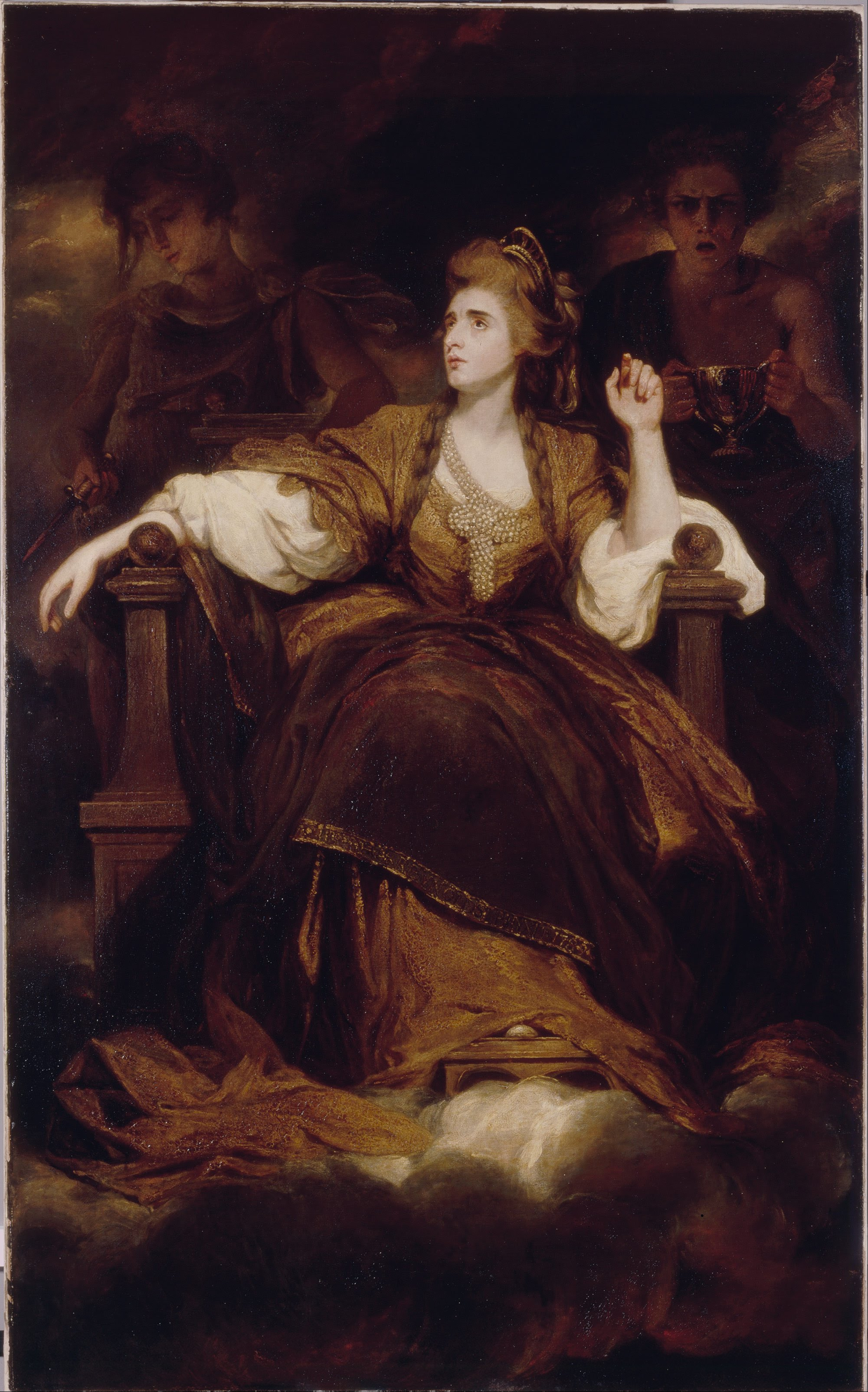
Sarah Siddons as the Tragic Muse by Joshua Reynolds

The Royal Academy Exhibition of 1784 was an art exhibition held at Somerset House in London between 26 April and 3 June 1784. It was the sixteenth annual Summer Exhibition of the Royal Academy of Arts.

The exhibition was marked by disputes and the absence of many of the leading painters of the era. George Stubbs and Joseph Wright of Derby had both been denied membership of the Academy. The latter responded by hosting his own successful private show. Most significantly, when the hanging committee refused to hang his royal portrait The Three Eldest Princesses to his satisfaction, Thomas Gainsborough withdrew it and all the other works he had planned to exhibit that year. This marked the second and final time he had withdrawn from the Academy and he submitted no further works for the remainder of his career.

Gainsborough's rival the president of the Royal Academy displayed seventeen paintings including a number of portraits of George, Prince of Wales and Charles James Fox. His Sarah Siddons as the Tragic Muse featuring the popular West End actress was one of the most acclaimed works on display. A number of paintings featured British naval victories against France during the recent American War of Independence. Two paintings by John Webber and Johann Heinrich Ramberg depicted exploratory travels and Death of James Cook in Hawaii five years earlier.

The American artist John Singleton Copley chose to display The Death of Major Pierson his popular painting of a scene from American War of Independence at a private exhibition rather than at the Royal Academy. His fellow American John Trumbull submitted a portrait of John Temple, who had provided assistance to him when he has been imprisoned during the recent war. A second Trumbull work, a history painting featured the Ancient Roman Cincinnatus, is now lost. The Pennsylvania-born Benjamin West displayed the large biblical painting Moses Receiving the Law on Mount Sinai which dominated the east wall of the Great Room and was praised for its "great taste and sublimity".

The French-born British artist Philip James de Loutherbourg displayed a group of landscapes of Derbyshire and Westmoreland in a proto-romantic style. The German artist Johann Zoffany submitted several portraits. Francis Wheatley sent in several scenes from Ireland, notably The Salmon Leap, Lexlip. John Opie displayed The Schoolmistress.

== Gallery ==
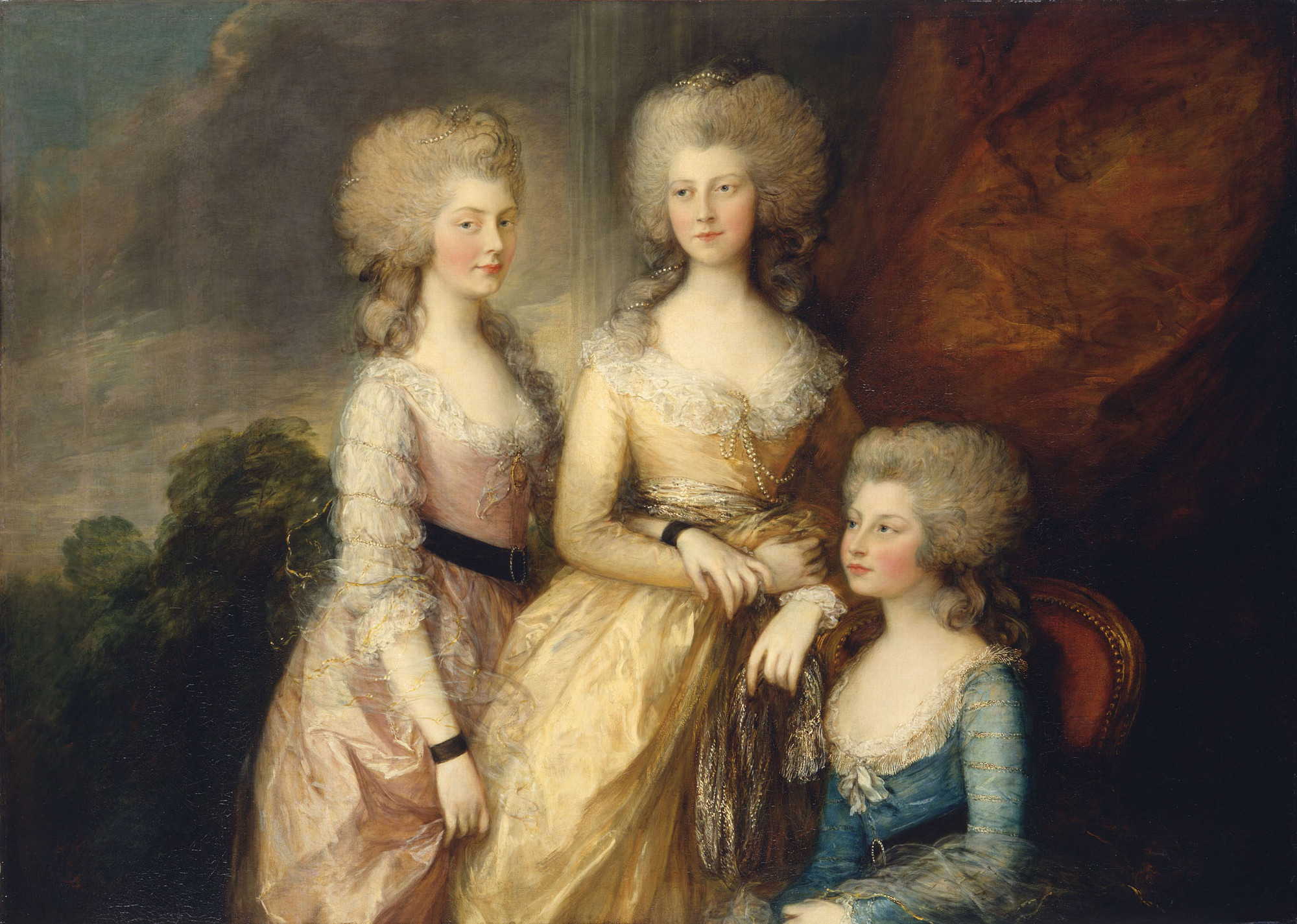
The Three Eldest Princesses by Thomas Gainsborough. Withdrawn from the Exhibition

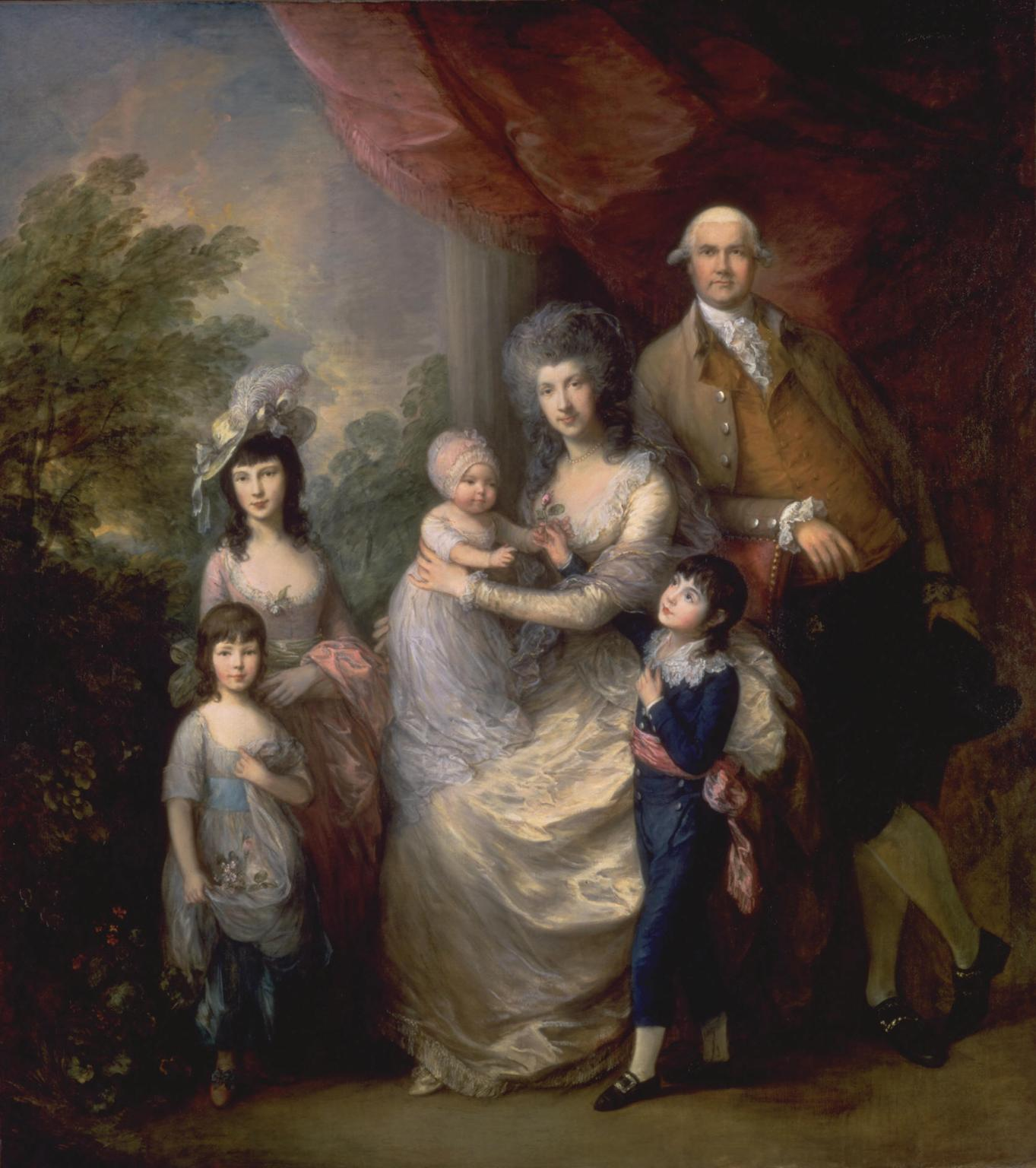
The Baillie Family by Thomas Gainsborough. Withdrawn from the Exhibition

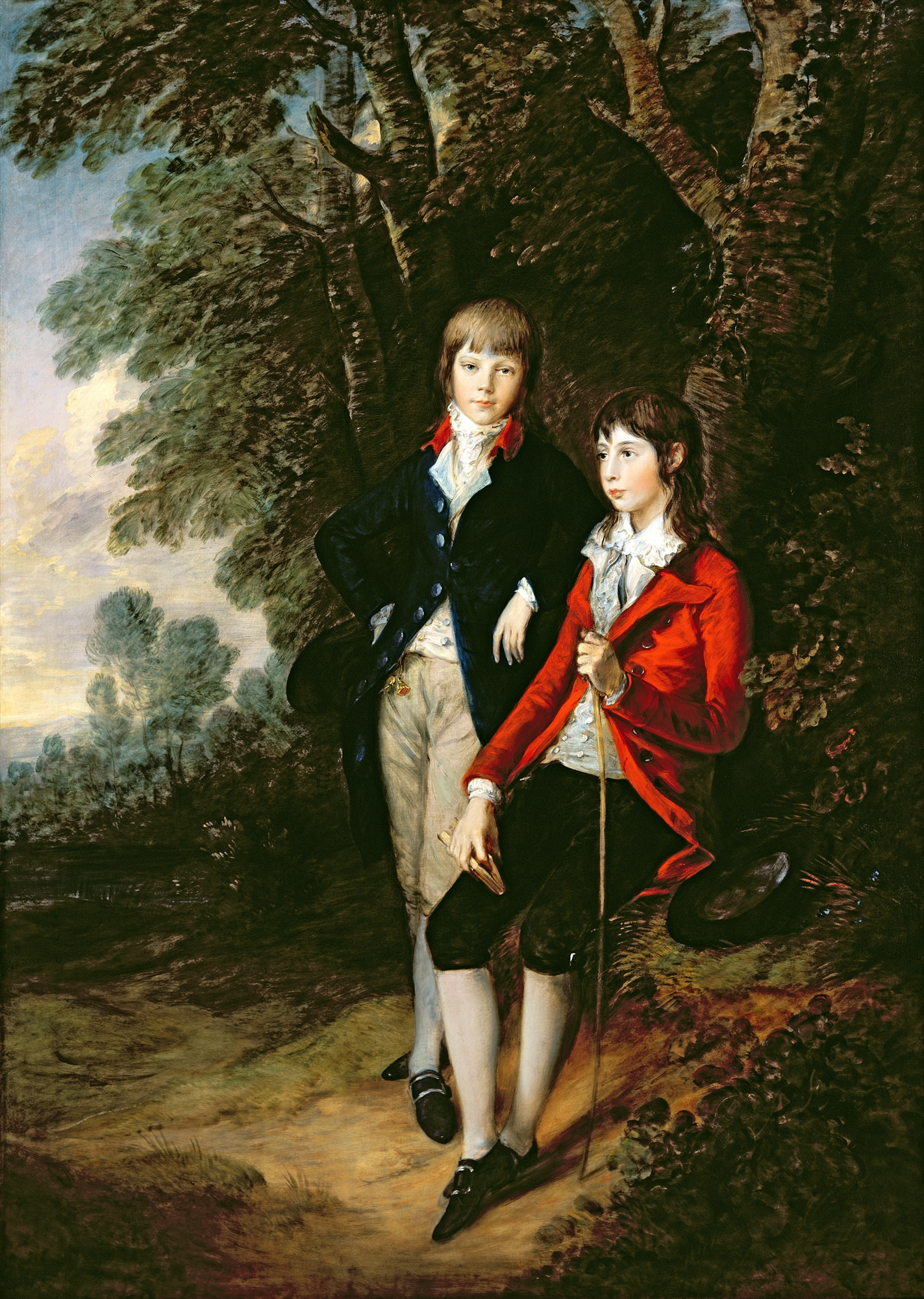
The Tomkinson Brothers by Thomas Gainsborough. Withdrawn from the Exhibition.

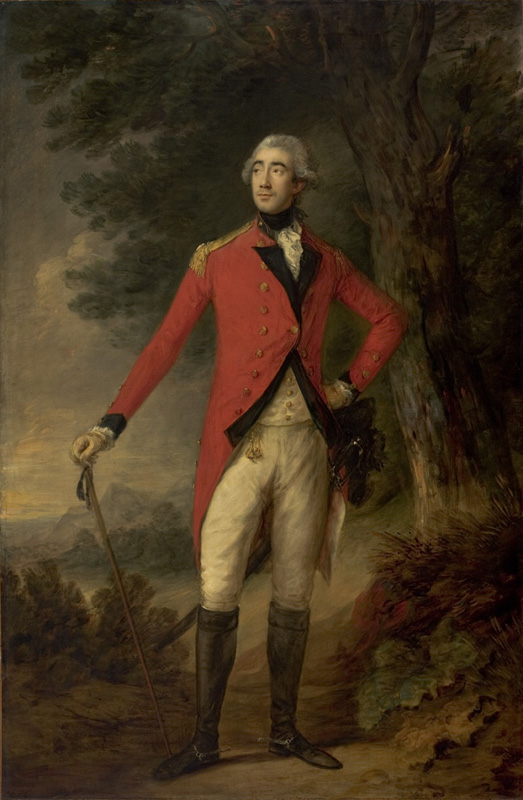
Portrait of Lord Rawdon by Thomas Gainsborough. Withdrawn from the Exhibition

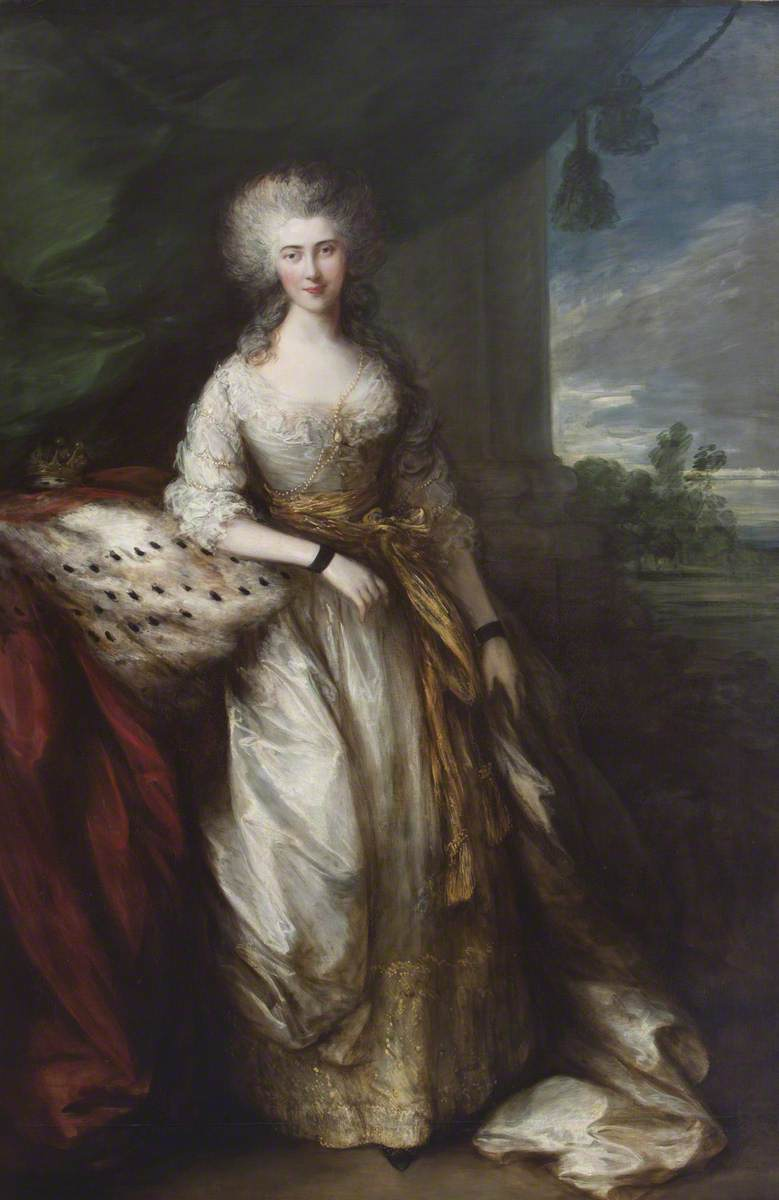
Portrait of the Countess of Buckinghamshire by Thomas Gainsborough. Withdrawn from the Exhibition

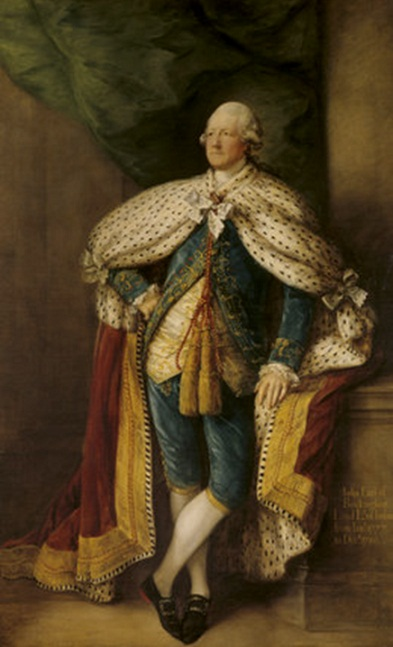
Portrait of the Earl of Buckinghamshire by Thomas Gainsborough. Withdrawn from the Exhibition

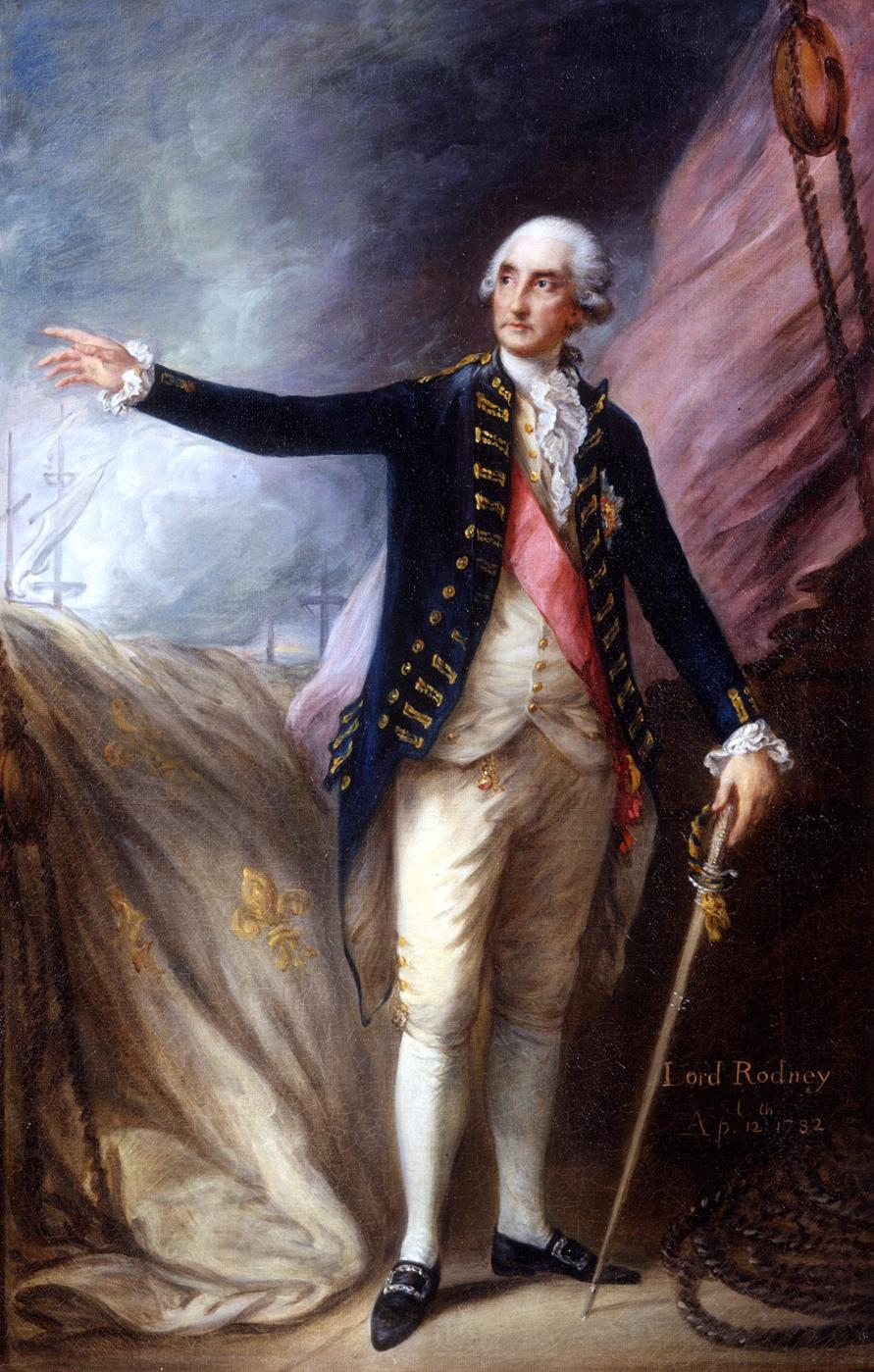
Portrait of Admiral Rodney by Thomas Gainsborough. Withdrawn from the Exhibition

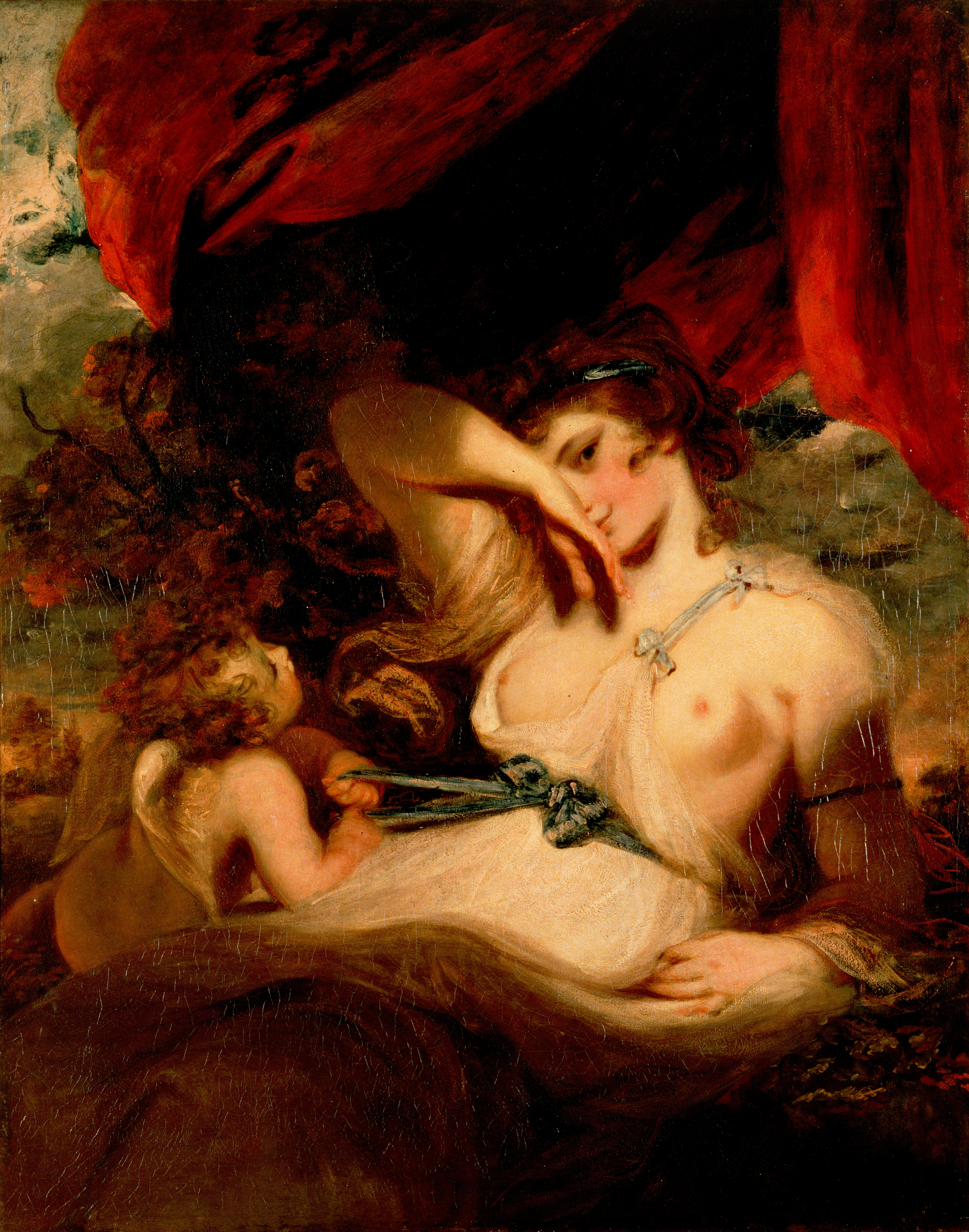
Cupid Untying the Zone of Venus by Joshua Reynolds

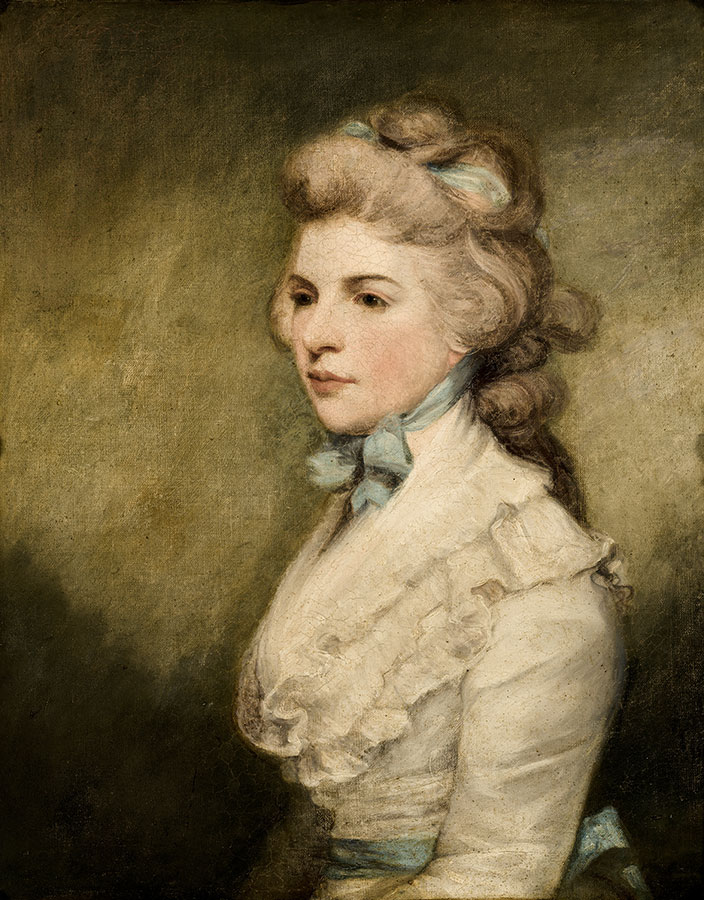
Portrait of Frances Kemble by Joshua Reynolds

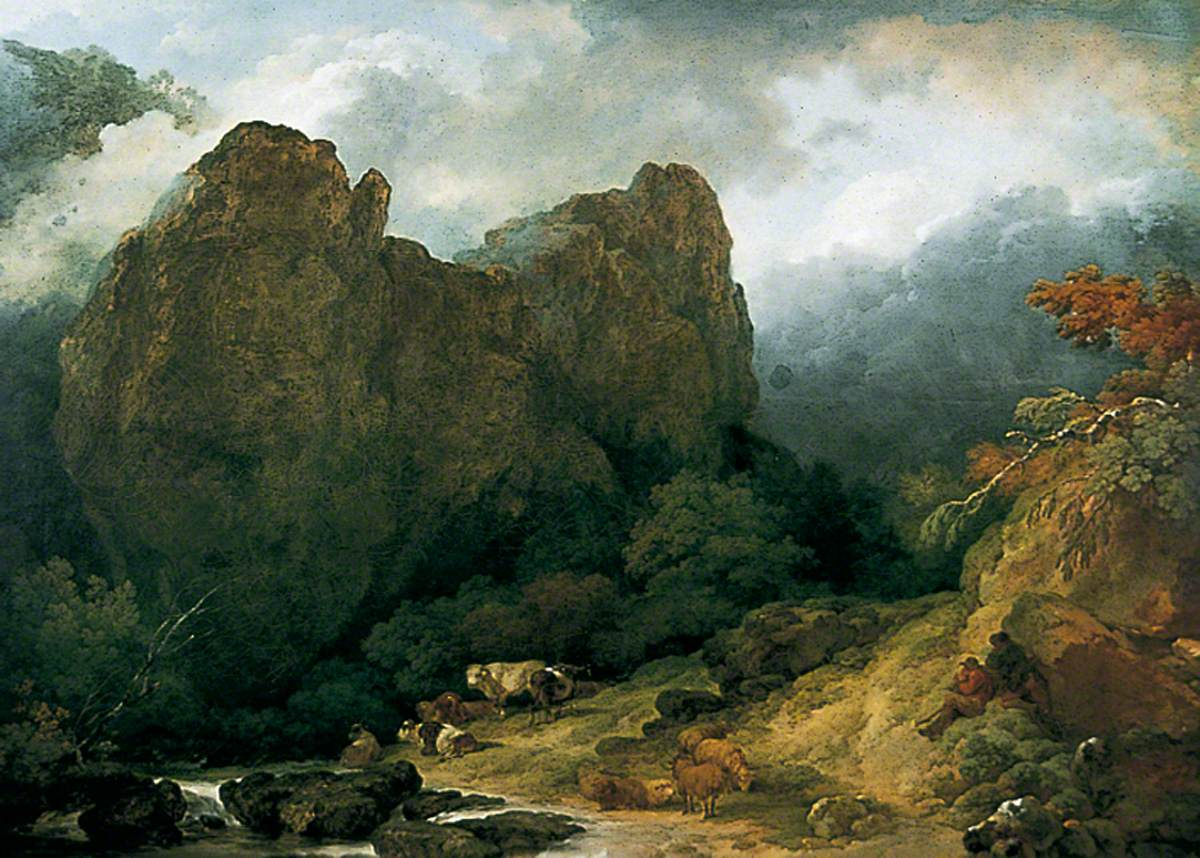
Dovedale in Derbyshire by Philip James de Loutherbourg

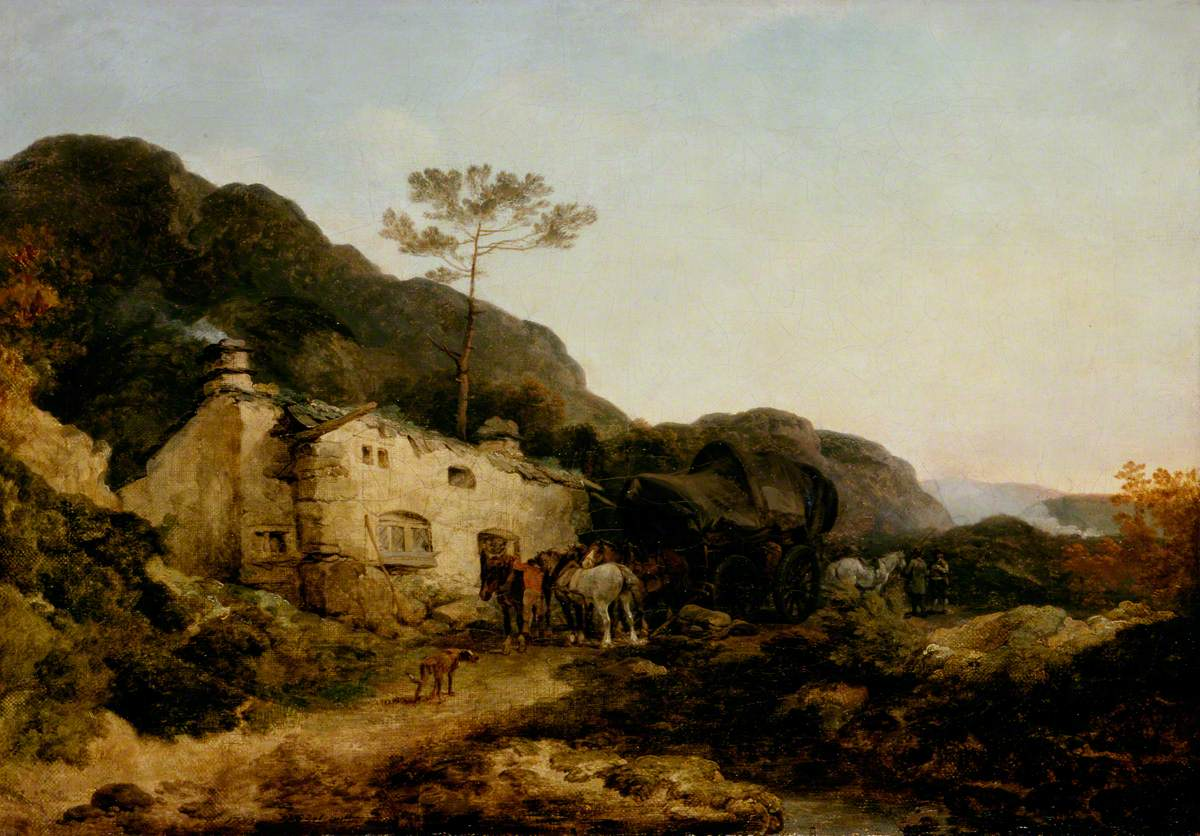
A Cottage in Patterdale, Westmoreland by Philip James de Loutherbourg

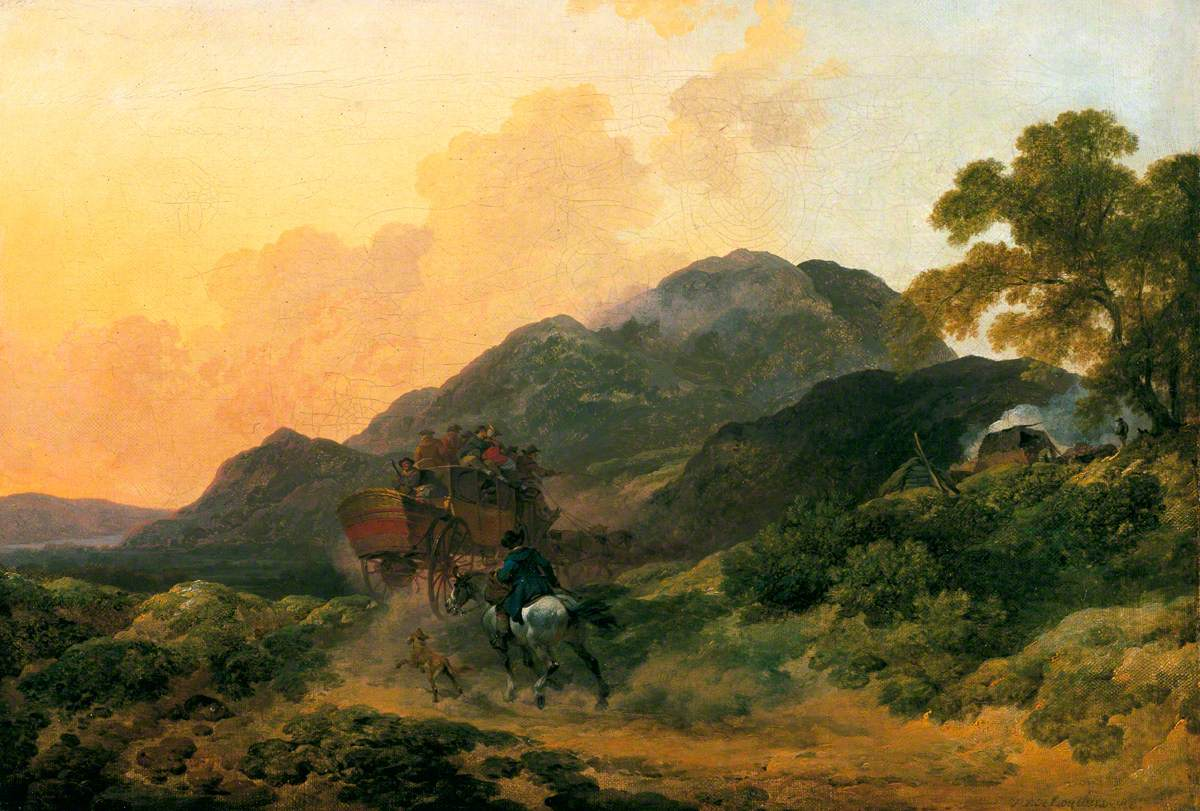
Skiddaw, Cumberland, a Summer Evening with a Stage Coach by Philip James de Loutherbourg

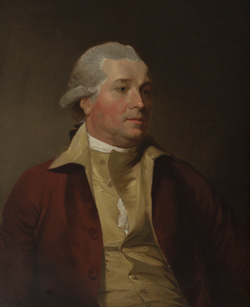
Portrait of John Temple, a copy by Gilbert Stuart of the painting exhibited by John Trumbull

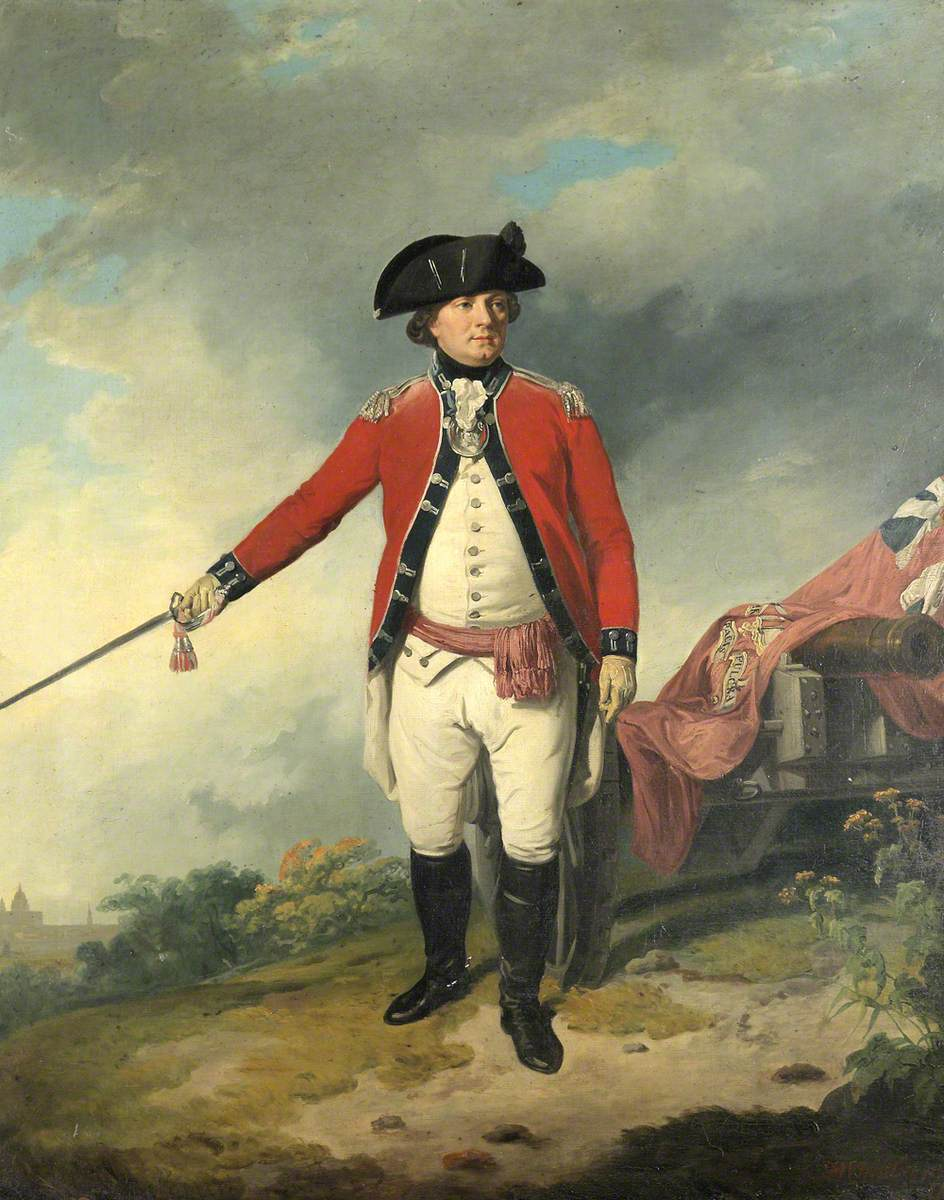
Portrait of Barnard Turner by Francis Wheatley

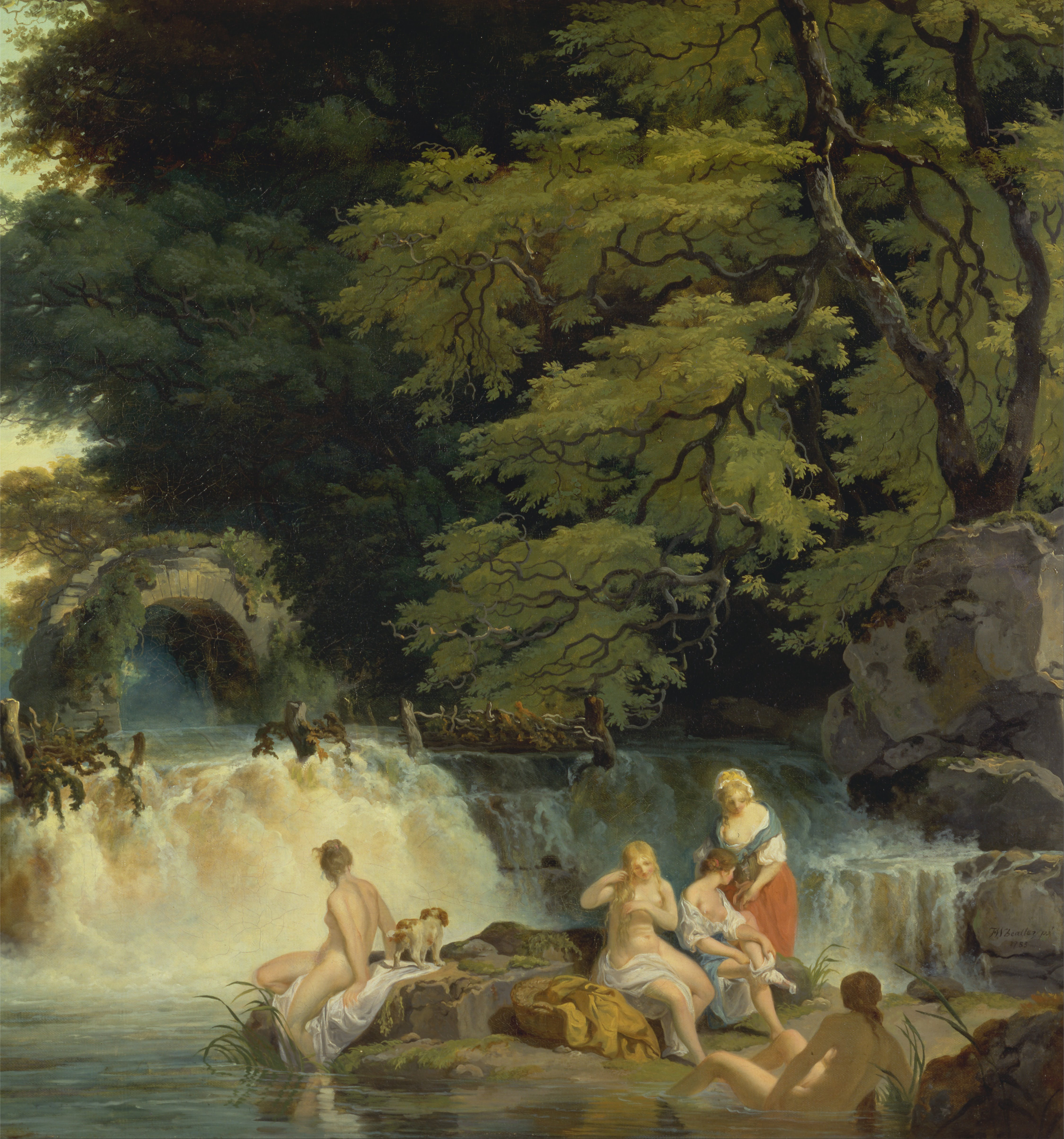
The Salmon Leap, Leixlip by Francis Wheatley

The capture of the 'Amazone' by HM ship 'Santa Margarita', 29 July 1782 by Robert Dodd

Action between the Amazone and HMS Santa Margarita - cutting the prize adrift, 30 July 1782 by Robert Dodd

A Master in Chancery Entering the House of Lords by Ralph Earl

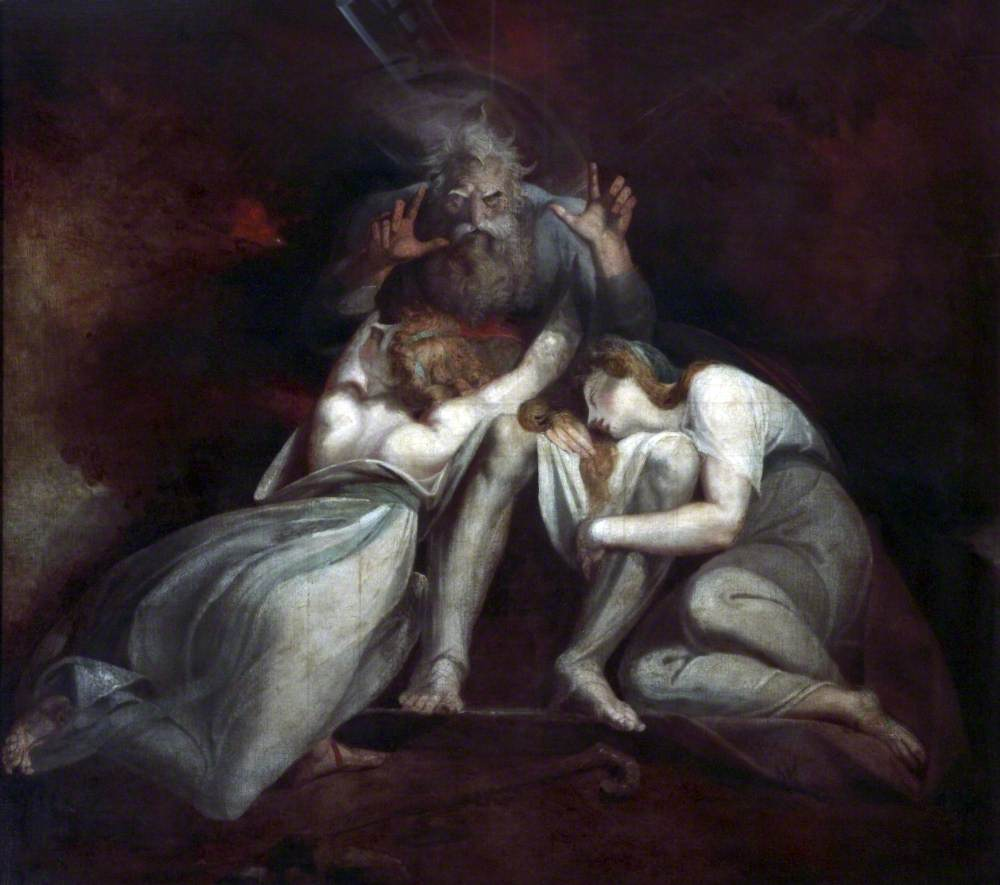
The Death of Oedipus by Henry Fuseli

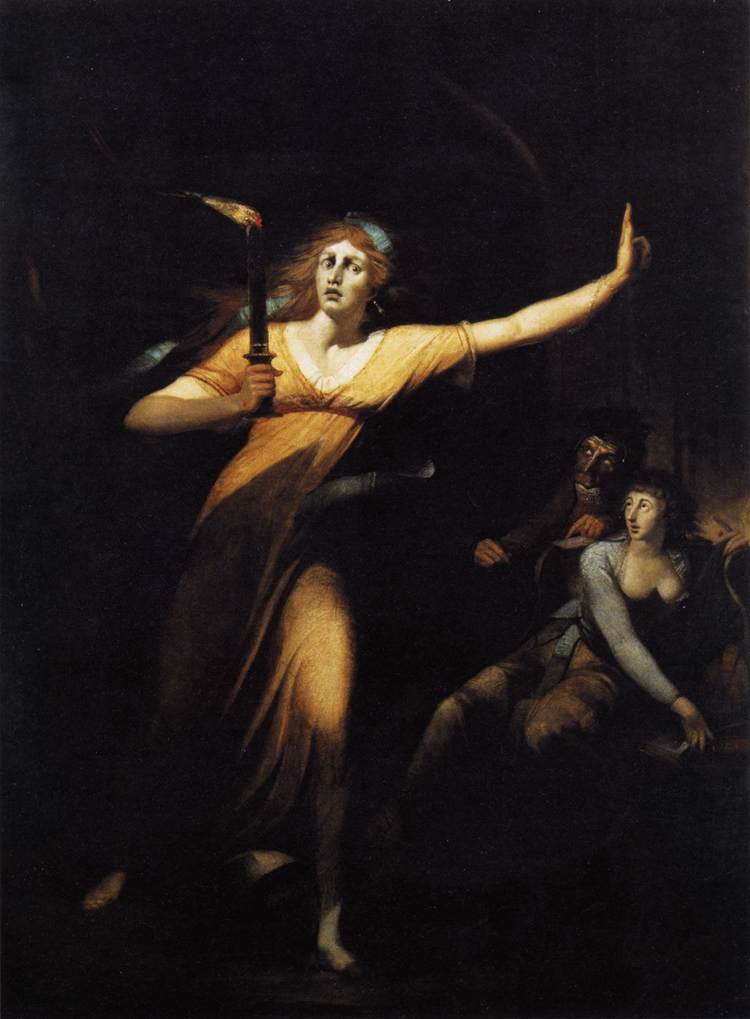
Lady Macbeth Sleepwalking by Henry Fuseli

Moses Receiving the Law on Mount Sinai by Benjamin West

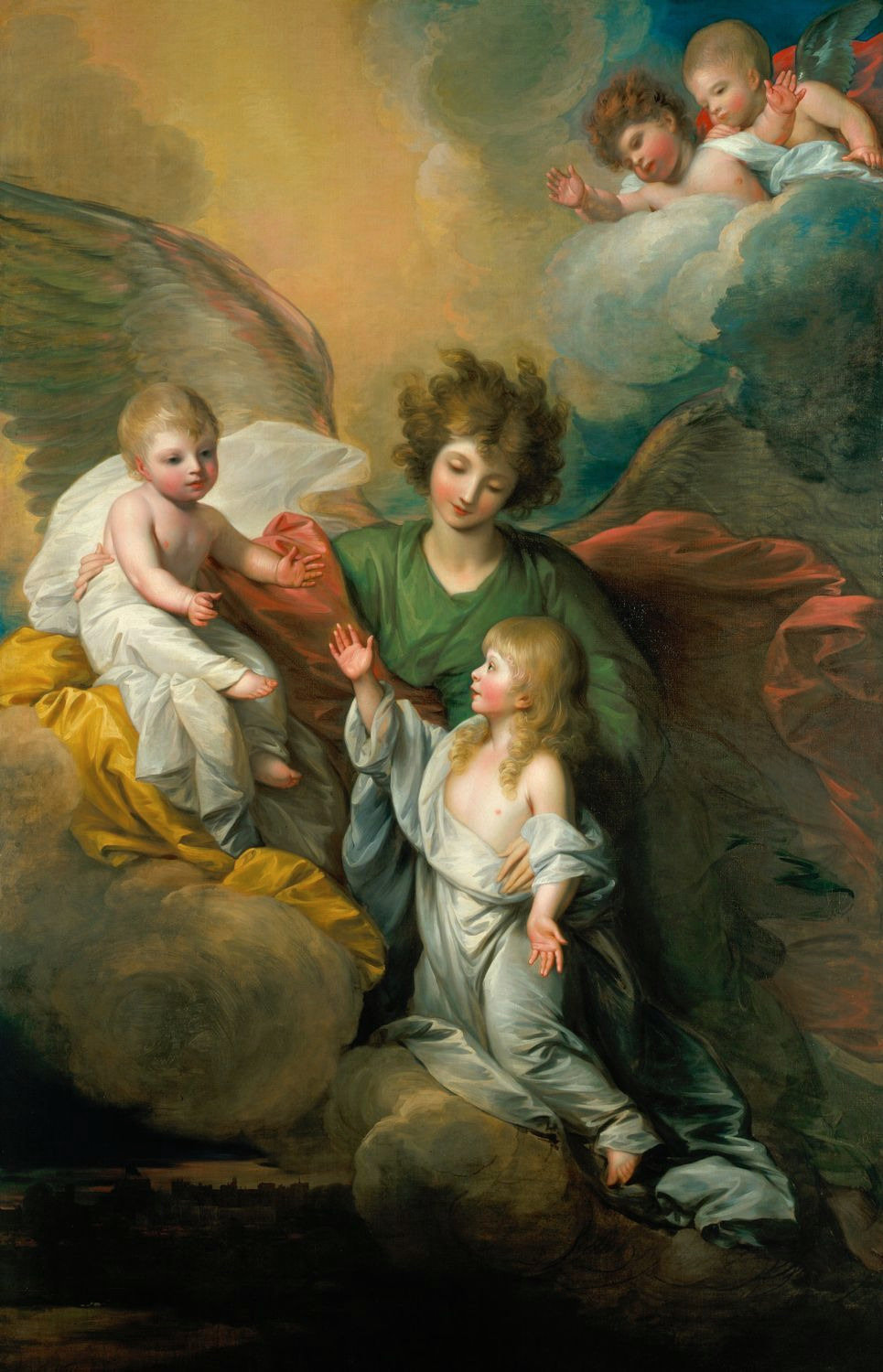
The Apotheosis of Prince Octavius by Benjamin West

The Schoolmistress by John Opie

Old Ouse Bridge, York by Joseph Farington

== Bibliography ==
- Hamilton, James. Gainsborough: A Portrait. Hachette UK, 2017.
- Hoock, Holger. Empires of the Imagination: Politics, War, and the Arts in the British World, 1750–1850. Profile Books, 2010.
- McIntyre, Ian. Joshua Reynolds: The Life and Times of the First President of the Royal Academy. Allen Lane, 2003.
- Staiti, Paul. Of Arms and Artists: The American Revolution through Painters' Eyes. Bloomsbury Publishing USA, 2016.
