= Portrait of Lord Rawdon =

Painting by Thomas Gainsborough

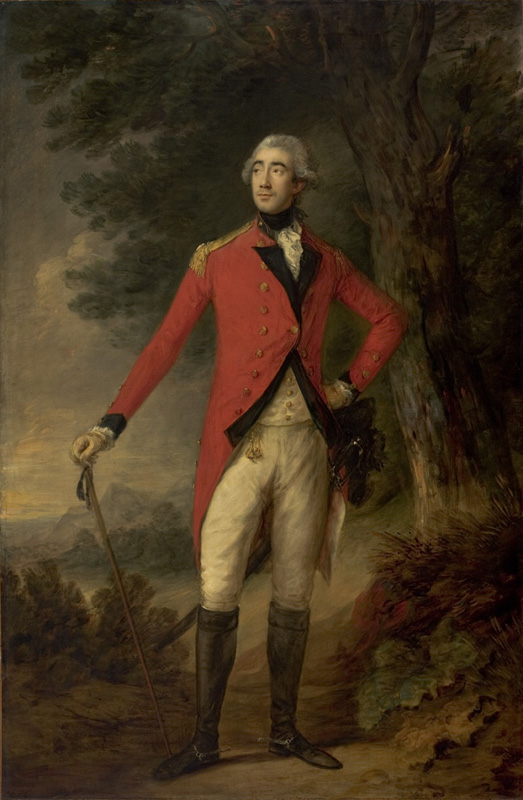
- Artist: Thomas Gainsborough
- Year: 1784
- Type: Oil on canvas, portrait painting
- Dimensions: 230 cm × 150 cm (91 in × 59 in)
- Location: São Paulo Museum of Art; São Paulo

Portrait of Lord Rawdon is an oil on canvas portrait painting by the English artist Thomas Gainsborough, from 1784. It depicts the Anglo-Irish soldier and politician Lord Rawdon. He is shown at full-length in his British Army uniform against an Arcadian background. It is held im the São Paulo Museum of Art.

== History and description ==
Rawdon had notably served under Lord Cornwallis during the Southern Campaign of the American War of Independence. Later made Earl of Moira, he was a leading Whig and a close ally and friend of the future king George IV, who unsuccessfully tried to have him become Prime Minister during the Regency era.

Gainsborough was one of Britain's most fashionable portraits who had relocated from Bath to the capital a decade earlier. This was a dual commission, as Cornwallis and Rawdon both commissioned him to produce a portrait so they could exchange the pictures.

The painting was one of eighteen paintings Gainsborough submitted to the Royal Academy Exhibition of 1784 at Somerset House. After a dispute with his fellow members of the Royal Academy over the hanging arrangements, he withdrew all the paintings at the last moment. He instead exhibited them at his own residence at Schomberg House, in Pall Mall. This marked his final break with the academy and he didn't display his work there again.

Shortly after Gainsborough's death, his long-standing rival Joshua Reynolds produced his own depiction of the sitter, Portrait of Lord Moira, one of his final works.

== Bibliography ==
- Hamilton, James. Gainsborough: A Portrait. Hachette UK, 2017.
- Hutchinson, Martin. Lord Liverpool: Britain's Greatest Prime Minister. Lutterworth Press, 2020
- Ingamells, John. National Portrait Gallery Mid-Georgian Portraits, 1760–1790. National Portrait Gallery, 2004.
- Lindsay, Jack. Thomas Gainsborough: His Life and Art. Granada, 1981.
