= Court uniform and dress =

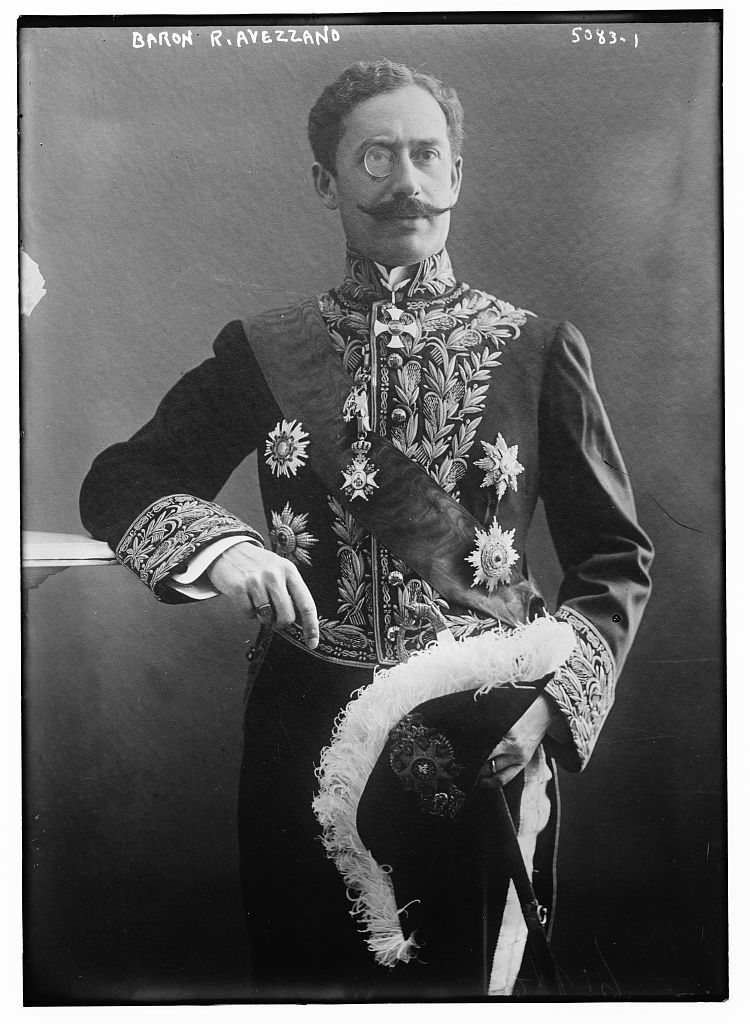
Camillo Romano Avezzana in full Italian court dress circa 1915

Court uniform and dress may refer to the formal attire worn by officials and others in attendance upon a royal court up until the mid-20th century.

== United Kingdom ==
Court uniform was worn by those holding particular offices associated with the Crown (including certain specified civil servants and members of the Royal Household, and all Privy Counsellors). Its use extended to the diplomatic service and officials working in the colonies and dominions. A range of office-holders were entitled to wear it, with different classes of uniform specified for different grades of official. Introduced in the early 1820s, it is still worn today on state occasions by a select number of dignitaries both in the UK and in certain other Commonwealth realms.

Court dress, on the other hand, is a stylized form of clothing deriving from fashionable eighteenth-century wear, which was directed to be worn at court by those not entitled to a court uniform. For men, it comprised a matching tailcoat and waistcoat, breeches and stockings, lace cuffs and cravat, together with a cocked hat and a sword. For women, a white or cream evening gown was to be worn, together with a train and other specified accoutrements. Male court dress is still worn today as part of the formal dress of judges and King's Counsel, and is also worn by certain lord mayors, parliamentary officials, and high sheriffs of counties. Formerly, female court dress was required wear for debutantes being presented at court, but it ceased to be regularly worn after the Second World War, as afternoon presentations largely replaced evening courts.

Forms of courtly dress were at one time dictated by fashion, but they later came to be subject to (increasingly detailed) regulations. By the end of the 18th century court dress, for men and for women, was becoming more fixed in style and beginning to look rather antiquated. From the end of the 19th century, precise descriptions were laid down (of court dress and court uniform) in an official publication called Dress Worn at Court, which was issued with the authority of the Lord Chamberlain. The 1937 edition remains authoritative for those rare circumstances in which court uniform or court dress are still required.

== Empire of Japan ==
The official court dress of the Empire of Japan, used from the Meiji period until the end of the Second World War, consisted of European-inspired clothing of the 1870's. It was first introduced at the beginning of the Meiji period and maintained through the institution of the constitutional monarchy by the Meiji Constitution, and represented the highest uniforms in use at the time. Uniforms for members of the kazoku peerage and civil officials were officially set.

== Austrian Empire ==
In the early 19th century, the Austrian court in Vienna began adopting uniforms for the state bureaucrats, court bureaucrats and holders of the honorary court offices such as Lord Chamberlain, Lord High Steward, or Privy Counsellor. The court introduced regulations for court uniforms for state officials in 1812, which was followed with regulations for high court officers and court bureaucrats two years later. State bureaucrats were assigned a dark green coat with facings of different colours depending on their department. Courtiers and court bureaucrats were assigned coats of stahlgrün (very dark green that appeared almost black). The depth and gold or silver colour of the embroidery on the cuffs and collars corresponded to the grade of the official. Tailcoats in the 1814 regulations also included laurel and oak leaves embroidered on the chest, collar and cuffs. The high court officers and diplomats had a Gala uniform, a levée uniform (Staats-uniform), and a field uniform (Campagne-uniform). The levée or field uniform of a diplomat was the same as the Gala uniform of the next lower grade of diplomat. In 1849, Emperor Franz Joseph introduced a standard uniform for all government (not court) functionaries, consisting of a dark green tailcoat with red collar, red piping and gold cuff embroidery. Nevertheless, military uniform superseded court uniform whenever the official was entitled to wear both.

== France ==
The traditional court costume for male courtiers in Ancien Regime France was the habit habillé, a magnificent garment which showcased the splendour of class rather than service to the state. Uniforms were generally not allowed at court. The habit habillé was so expensive that by the 1780s the court began experimenting with temporary yet nevertheless elaborate uniforms — which still reduced the financial burden on courtiers. Even after the Revolution, the republican French Directory in 1795 introduced elaborate uniforms for officials and legislators to encourage public respect, consisting of a red (ordinary occasions) or blue (more formal occasions) silk manteau fringed with gold embroidery and a blue silk sash with gold tassels. These were used in official functions such as audiences in the Luxembourg Palace. In 1799, Napoleon Bonaparte hinted at his monarchical ambitions when he introduced heavily-embroidered court uniforms for consuls and ministers, and members of the legislature and the Conseil d'État, when he was still First Consul of France. In 1800, the uniforms were extended to prefects and senators, and the following year to all remaining public officials. Those without uniforms had to wear the habit habillé, the 18th century court dress which had already disappeared elsewhere in Europe. Later, Jean-Baptiste Isabey created uniforms for each department of the Emperor's household: scarlet for the Grand maréchal du palais, crimson for the Grand chambellan, light blue for the Grand écuyer, violet for the Grand maître des cérémonies, and green for the hunt, all of which the officials had to purchase themselves.

Under the Bourbon Restoration, court uniforms for deputies were regulated in 1815. Even the liberal opposition generally wore the uniform for the portraits and public functions although they were designed to confirm dynastic power by sewing fleurs-de-lys on the collar, cuffs and buttons. In 1820, the Maison du Roi's court officials all received civil uniforms which were mandatory for use. These uniforms were based closely on the previous Emperor's household: red for the Gouvernements, dark blue for the Chambre, light blue for the Écuries, green for the Hunt, violet for the Cérémonies. There was grande tenue in silk-lined velvet with gold embroidery on the pockets, coat edges, cuffs and collars (of varying widths depending on rank) and a petite tenue in silk-lined cloth. These uniforms were highly popular in the 1820s; notables solicited court positions to acquire the uniform, causing the court to grow rapidly. Nevertheless, many court officials preferred their military uniforms, and the court declared the use of civil uniforms as mandatory when acting in that positions.

During the July Monarchy, King Louis-Philippe initially avoided court uniforms in his court in lieu of the simple frock coat due to revolutionary opposition. However, due to pressure from the clothing industry and public mockery of their appearance, Louis-Philippe revived court uniforms gradually, distancing himself from his revolutionary roots. By 1837, only one guest at the wedding of the Duke of Orleans did not wear a uniform, and in the same year the king ordered that those not issued a uniform had to use the habit habillé (which had been avoided during the Restoration).

== Ottoman Empire ==
The official court uniform and dress of the Ottoman Empire were required to be worn by those in attendance at the imperial court in the nineteenth century, with the aim of being on the same line as most European nations. It consisted of European-inspired clothing in the Empire style. It was introduced during the early stages of the Tanzimat modernization period until the end of the First World War.

The Tanzimat reforms emerged from the minds of reformist sultans like Mahmud II, his son Abdulmejid I and prominent, often European-educated bureaucrats, who recognised that the old religious and military institutions no longer met the needs of the empire. Most of the symbolic changes, such as uniforms, were aimed at changing the mindset of imperial administrators. Many of the officials affiliated with the government were encouraged to wear a more western style of dress. Many of the reforms were attempts to adopt successful European practices. The reforms were heavily influenced by the Napoleonic Code and French law under the Second French Empire as a direct result of the increasing number of Ottoman students being educated in France.

After the French military mission in 1796, French practices became very popular within Ottoman society. After the creation of the first cabinet, Mahmud II ordered several bureaucrats to the courts of France and other nations around the globe to observe not only clothing but also innovated institutions, which were acceptable for that era. The first new court uniforms were worn around 1839, the time of the sultan's death. His son Abdulmejid I succeeded him and French-style court uniform and dress were officially set. European-style clothing was also popular among the upper class, as redingotes, jackets, waistcoats, frock coats, ties, sharp-pointed and high-heeled shoes were not unusual during the Tanzimat modernization period.
