= Lady Macbeth Sleepwalking =

Painting by Henry Fuseli

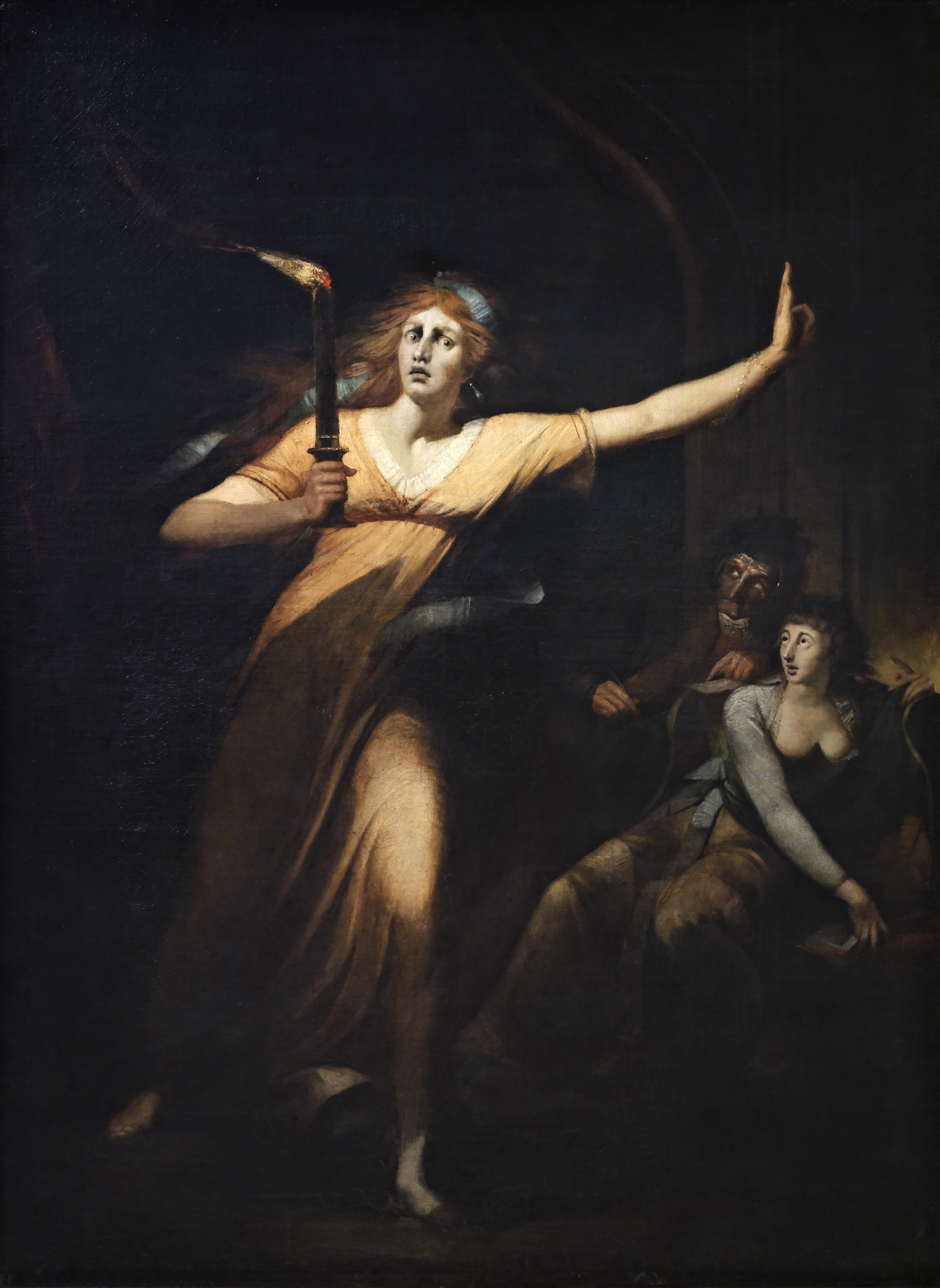
- Artist: Henry Fuseli
- Year: c. 1784
- Type: Oil on canvas, history painting
- Dimensions: 221 cm × 160 cm (87 in × 63 in)
- Location: Tate Britain; London

Lady Macbeth Sleepwalking is a c. 1784 oil painting by the Swiss artist Henry Fuseli. Based on the Sleepwalking scene of the 1606 tragedy Macbeth by William Shakespeare, it depicts a life-size Lady Macbeth sleepwalking. Long resident in Britain, Fuseli was known for his Gothic paintings. He produced a number of pictures inspired by Macbeth.

The painting was displayed at the Royal Academy Exhibition of 1784 at Somerset House in London. Today it is in the collection of the Louvre in Paris, having been purchased in 1970.

== Bibliography ==
- Pomerède, Vincent & Trébosc, Delphine. 1001 Paintings at the Louvre: From Antiquity to the Nineteenth Century. Musée du Louvre Editions, 2005
- Smith, Gay. Lady Macbeth in America: From the Stage to the White House. Palgrave Macmillan, 2010.
