= Jacopo Tumicelli =

Italian painter (1784–1825)

Jacopo Tumicelli or Tunicelli (1784– January 11, 1825) was an Italian painter.

== Biography ==
He was born in Villafranca di Verona near Verona. He initially studied under Saverio della Rosa, and afterwards in the academy of Milan, and was a prominent portrait miniature painter of his day.
