= Portrait of Joshua Reynolds =

Painting by Gilbert Stuart

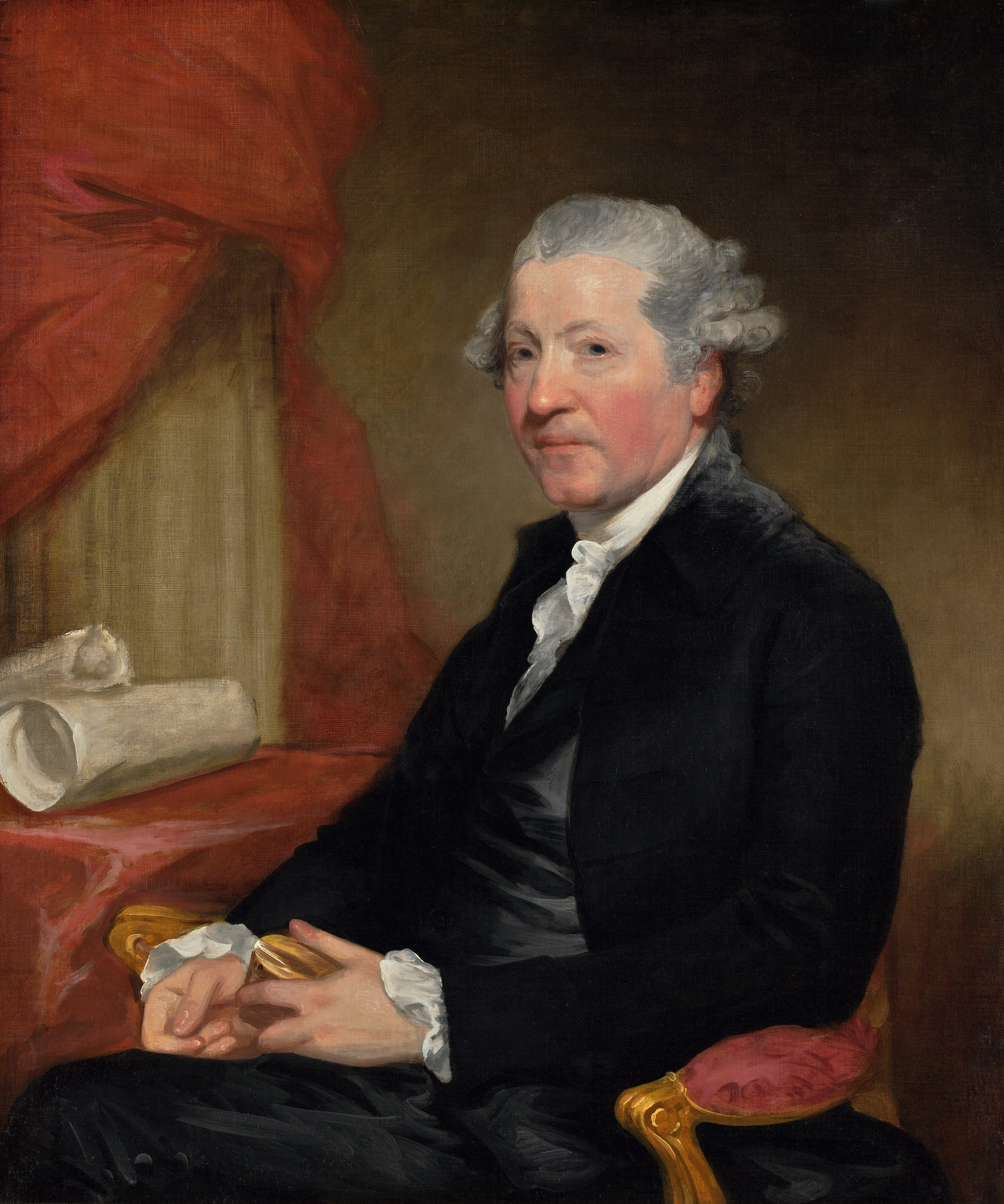
- Artist: Gilbert Stuart
- Year: 1784
- Type: Oil on canvas, portrait painting
- Dimensions: 91.6 cm × 76.4 cm (36.1 in × 30.1 in)
- Location: National Gallery of Art; Washington D.C.

Portrait of Joshua Reynolds is a 1784 portrait painting by the American artist Gilbert Stuart. It depicts the British painter Sir Joshua Reynolds, the President of the Royal Academy. Reynolds was a leading portraitist and had been a founder of the Royal Academy and became its first president 1768. While he produced a number of self-portraits, Reynolds rarely posed for other artists. It was noted for its inclusion of a snuff box rather than an artist's palette or brushes that might have been expected in a depiction of a well-known artist.

Reynold sat for the painting in July 1784. The painting was commissioned by John Boydell and was exhibited at the Boydell Shakespeare Gallery in 1786. It was one of fifteen portraits of celebrated artists displayed in the gallery. Today it is the collection of the National Gallery of Art in Washington D.C., having been acquired in 1942.

== See also ==
- Self-Portrait (Reynolds), a 1780 self-portrait by Reynolds
- Portrait of Benjamin West (Stuart, National Portrait Gallery), a 1785 portrait by Stuart of Reynolds' successor as President of the Royal Academy

== Bibliography ==
- Barratt, Carrie Rebora & Miles, Ellen G. Gilbert Stuart. Metropolitan Museum of Art, 2004.
- Staiti, Paul. Of Arms and Artists: The American Revolution through Painters' Eyes. Bloomsbury Publishing USA, 2016.
- Wendorf, Richard. Sir Joshua Reynolds: The Painter in Society. Harvard University Press, 1998.
