= The Three Eldest Princesses =

Painting by Thomas Gainsborough

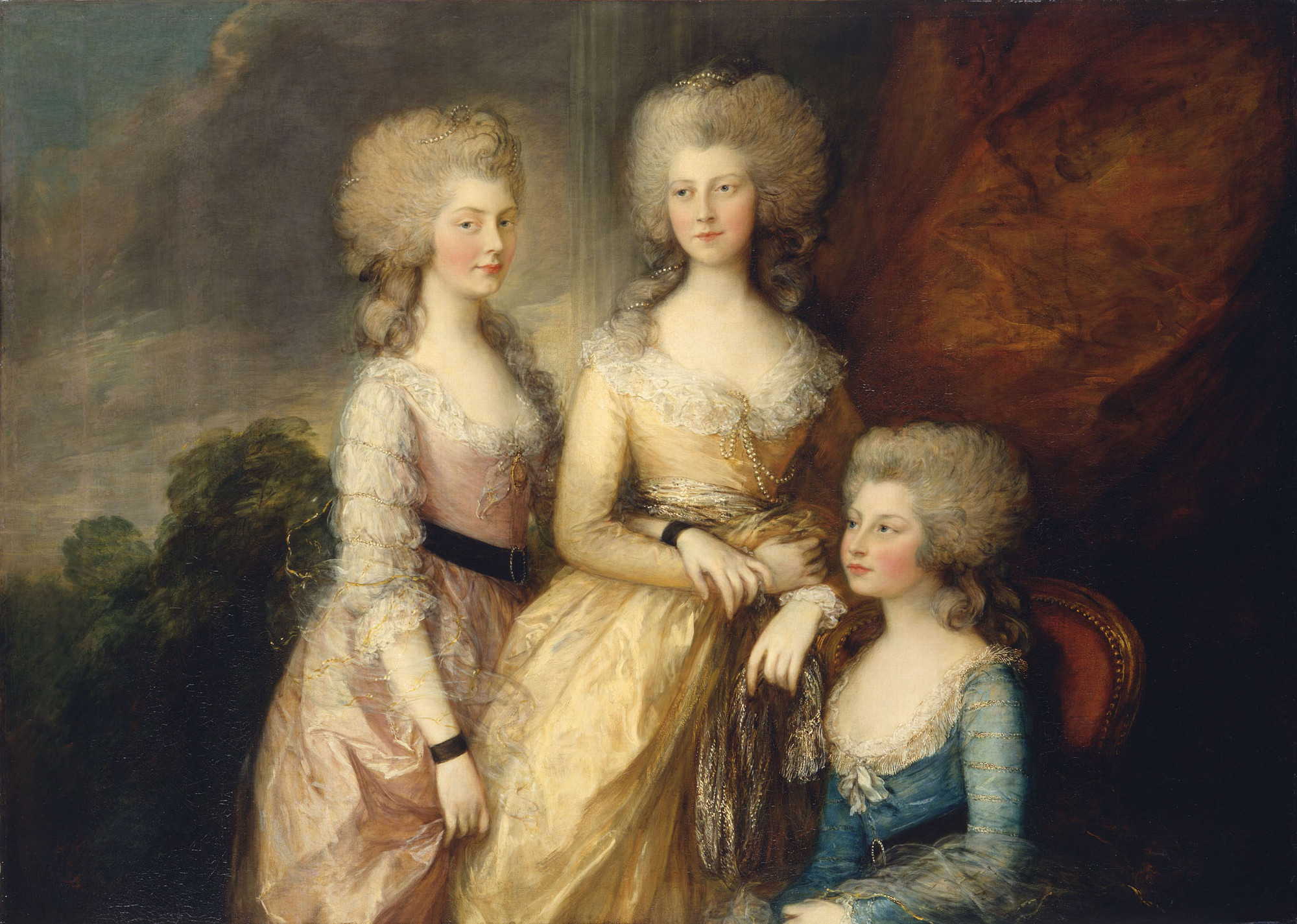
- Artist: Thomas Gainsborough
- Year: 1784
- Type: Oil on canvas, portrait painting
- Dimensions: 129.7 cm × 179.8 cm (51.1 in × 70.8 in)
- Location: Royal Collection, London

The Three Eldest Princesses is an oil on canvas portrait painting by the English artist Thomas Gainsborough, from 1784. The painting is held in the Royal Collection.

== History and description ==
A group portrait, it features the three eldest daughters of the British monarch George III and his wife, Queen Charlotte. From left to right it features Charlotte, Princess Royal, Princess Sophia Augusta and Princess Elizabeth. The work was commissioned by their brother, the then-Prince of Wales, for three hundred guineas.

Gainsborough had enjoyed increasing patronage from the royal family since his move from the spa town of Bath. The painting was a catalyst for Gainsborough's dramatic withdrawal from the Royal Academy Exhibition of 1784 at Somerset House. Despite being a founder member of the Royal Academy, he had long had a uneasy relationship with the institution. When a dispute arose over the hanging of the work, Gainsborough threatened to withdraw all the paintings he has submitted. The authorities called his bluff and all the works were removed just before the exhibition opened. The artist boycotted the Academy for the remainder of his career, choosing instead to exhibit his paintings at Schomberg House, in Pall Mall.

== Bibliography ==
- Bennett, Shelley, Leonard, Mark & West, Shearer. A Passion for Performance: Sarah Siddons and her Portraitists. Getty Publications, 1999.
- Hamilton, James. Gainsborough: A Portrait. Hachette UK, 2017.
- McIntyre, Ian. Joshua Reynolds: The Life and Times of the First President of the Royal Academy. Allen Lane, 2003
