= Paul Joseph Gabriël =

Dutch painter and sculptor

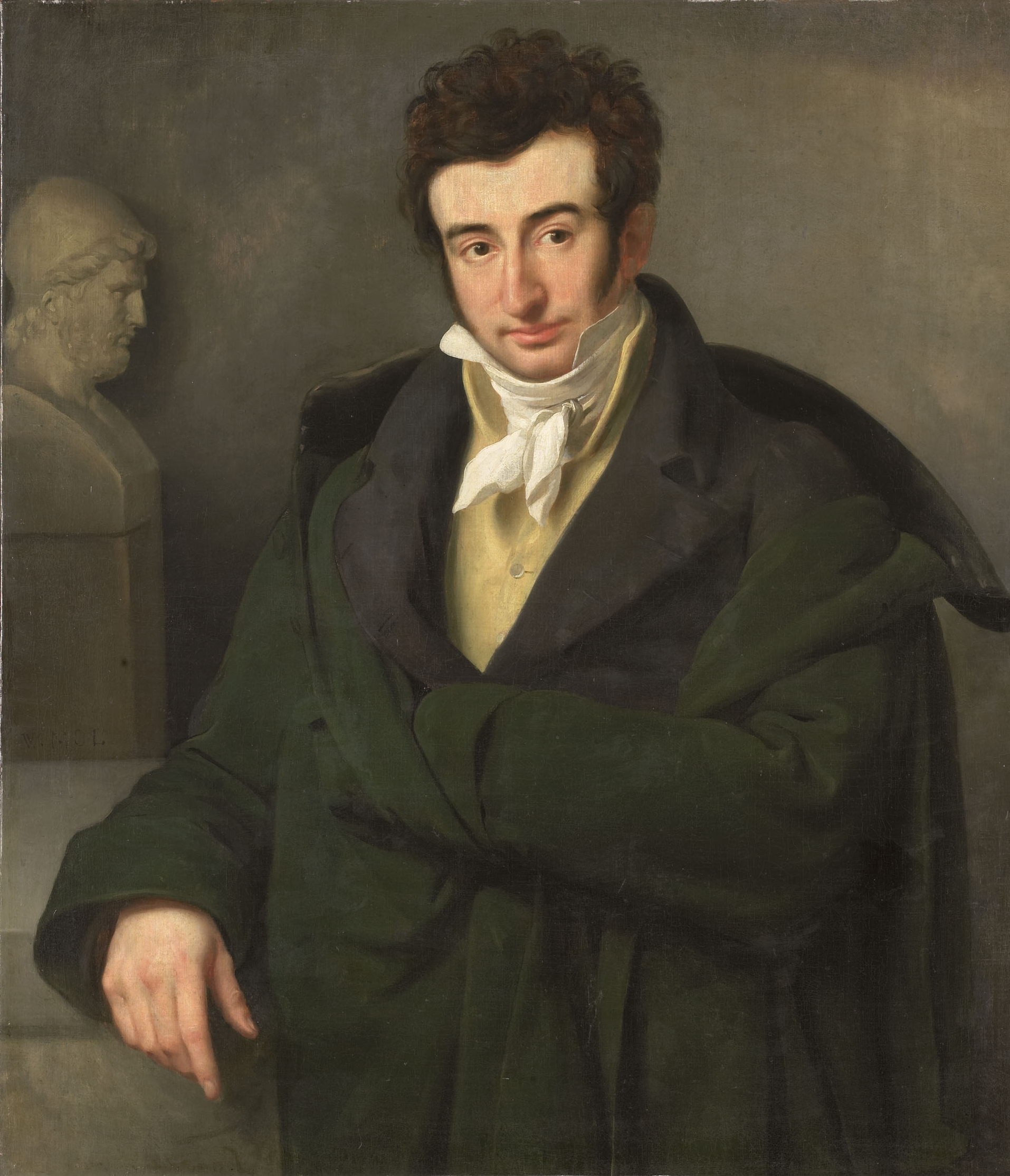
Portrait of Gabriël by Woutherus Mol, 1818, now in the Rijksmuseum

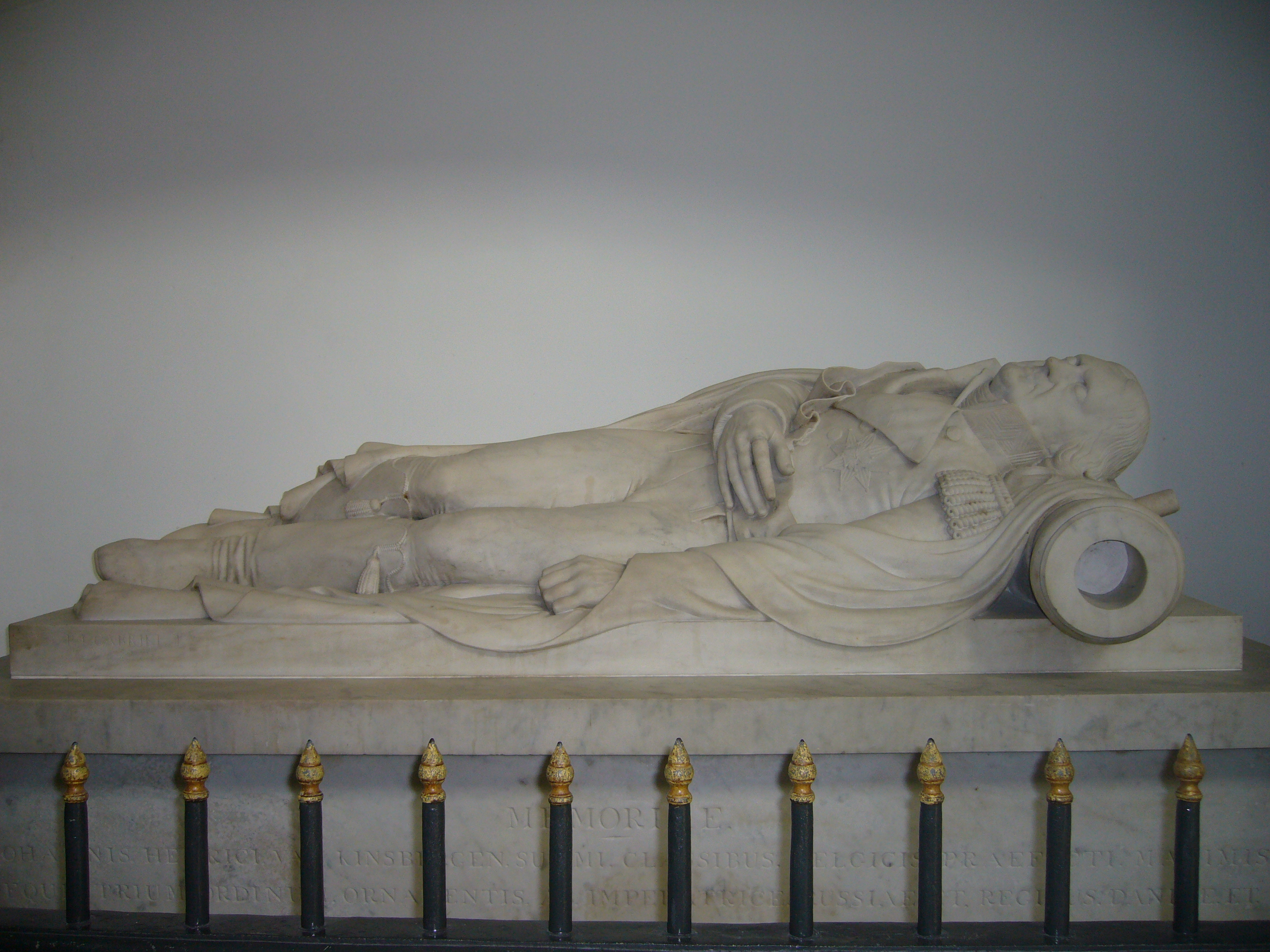
Cenotaph of Jan Hendrik van Kinsbergen in the Nieuwe Kerk in Amsterdam

Paul Joseph Gabriël (11 July 1784 – 31 December 1833) was a Dutch painter and sculptor.

He was born at Amsterdam, Dutch Republic, where he learned sculpture from his father and Canova, and devoted himself principally to that branch of art; but he at first practised miniature painting, and in his twentieth year proceeded to Paris specially to improve himself therein. In 1820 he was made a member of the Institute at Amsterdam, and director of the Royal Academy there. He died at Amsterdam, aged 49.
