= Henry Martin =

Henry Martin may refer to:

== Military and politics ==
- Sir Henry Martin, 1st Baronet (1733–1794), Royal Navy officer, MP for Southampton 1790–94
- Henry Martin (Kinsale MP) (1763–1839), UK MP for the Irish constituency of Kinsale 1806–1818
- Henry Byam Martin (1803–1865), Royal Navy officer and watercolour artist
- Henry Martin (general) (1888–1984), French military commander
- Henry Robert Charles Martin (1889–1942), British officer of arms
- Kalfie Martin (Henry James 1910–2000), South African military commander

== Sports ==
- Sir Henry Martin, 2nd Baronet (1768–1842), MCC cricketer
- Henry Martin (footballer) (1891–1974), Sunderland and England footballer
- Henry Martin (racing driver) (born 1965), race car driver from Argentina
- Henry Martín (born 1992), Mexican footballer

== Other ==
- Henry Austin Martin (1824–1884), physician, vaccine pioneer
- Henry Martin (priest) (1830–1903), Archdeacon of Lindisfarne
- Henry Martin (bishop) (1889–1971), Anglican bishop in Canada
- H. Newell Martin (1848–1896), British physiologist
- Henry Martin (murderer) (died 1866), British murderer
- Henry Martin (cartoonist) (1925–2020), American cartoonist
- "Henry Martin" (song), a traditional Scottish folk tune about a pirate
- Henry G. Martin (1952–2022), British filmmaker

== See also ==
- Henry Martyn (1781–1812), Anglican priest and missionary
- Henry Martyn (cricketer) (1877–1928), English cricketer
- Henry Martyn, a 1989 science fiction novel by L. Neil Smith
- Harry Martin (disambiguation)
- Henri Martin (disambiguation)
- Henry Marten (disambiguation)
- Martinizing, named after the chemist Henry Martin
