= Harold Martin =

Harold Martin may refer to:

- Harold Martin (footballer) (born 1950), VFL player and VFA coach
- Harold Martin (New Jersey politician) (1918–2010), Member of the New Jersey General Assembly
- Harold Martin (New Caledonian politician) (born 1954), politician of New Caledonia
- Harold Martin (dragster driver), American drag racer
- Harold Martin (RAF officer) (1918–1988), Australian Royal Air Force pilot during World War II
- Harold Martin (EastEnders), a fictional character from EastEnders
- Harold E. Martin (1923–2007), newspaper editor and publisher
- Harold L. Martin (born 1951), American engineer and educator
- Harold M. Martin (1896–1972), American naval aviator
- Harold T. Martin (born 1964), former NSA contractor convicted of theft of classified information
- Harold Martin Jr., CEO of the Taco Mac chain of restaurants
- Harold D. Martin (1899–1945), American football player and coach

== See also ==
- Harry Martin (disambiguation)
- Hal Martin (born 1985), American stock car racing driver
