= Henri Martin =

Henri Martin may refer to:

- Henri Martin (historian) (1810–1883), French historian
- Henri-Jean Guillaume Martin (1860–1943), French impressionist painter
- Henri Martin (French politician) (1927–2015), French communist leader
  - Henri Martin affair
- Henri Martin (American politician), State Senator, 31st Senate District, Connecticut
- Henri Martin (winemaker) (1903–1991), French mayor of Saint-Julien, owner of Château Gloria and Château Saint-Pierre
- Henri-Jean Martin (1924–2007), specialist on history of the book in Europe, history of writing and printing
- Henri Martin (lion tamer), French showman and lion tamer
- Henri Martin (political activist and physician), French physician, extreme-right-wing militant activist, resister and soldier

== See also ==
- Henry Martin (disambiguation)
