= Raden Saleh =

Indonesian painter (c. 1811 – 1880)

Raden Saleh Syarif Bustaman
- ꦫꦢꦺꦤ꧀ꦱꦭꦺꦃꦯ꦳ꦫꦶꦥ꦳꧀ꦨꦸꦱ꧀ꦠꦩꦤ꧀; رادين صالح شريف بوستامن
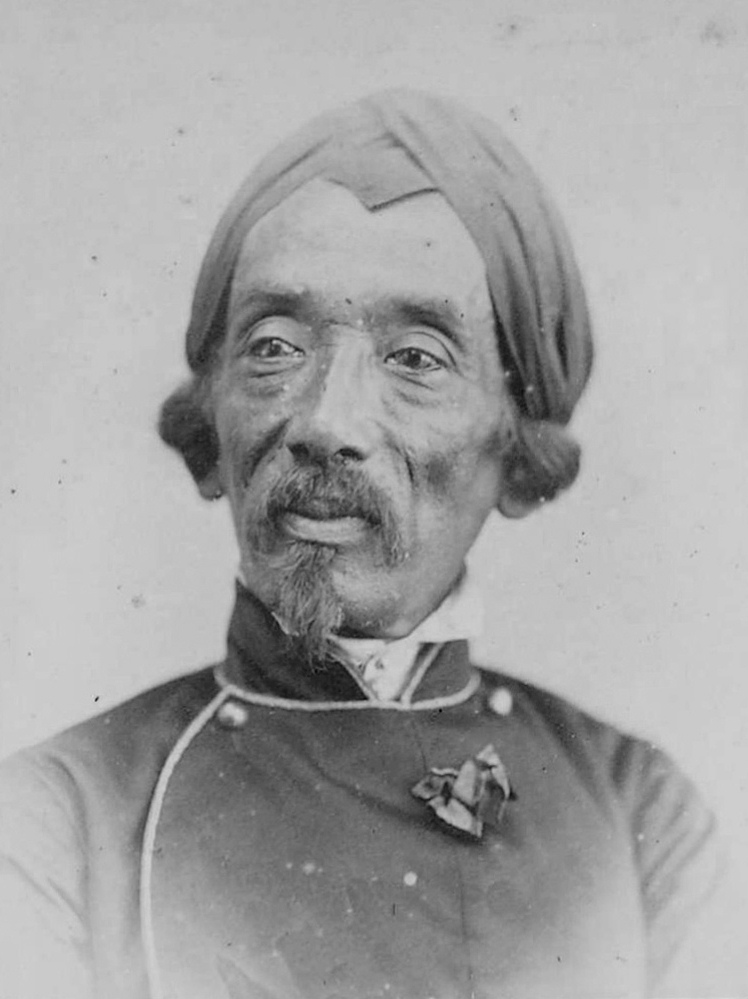
- Raden Saleh in c. 1872
- Born: Saleh Sjarif Boestaman c. 1811; Semarang, Dutch East Indies
- Died: 23 April 1880 (aged 68–69); Buitenzorg, Dutch East Indies
- Known for: Painting, drawing
- Notable work: The Arrest of Pangeran Diponegoro; Deer Hunt; View of Erupting Mount Merapi
- Movement: Romanticism
- Spouse(s): Constancia von Mansfeldt Raden Ayu Danudirja (m. 1867)
- Parents: Sayyid Husen bin Alwi bin Awal bin Yahya (father); Mas Adjeng Zarip Hoesen (mother)

Raden Saleh Sjarif Boestaman (Javanese: ꦫꦢꦺꦤ꧀ꦱꦭꦺꦃꦯ꦳ꦫꦶꦥ꦳꧀ꦨꦸꦱ꧀ꦠꦩꦤ꧀, EYD: Raden Saleh Syarif Bustaman; Arabic: رادين صالح شريف بوستامن, DIN: Rādīn Ṣāliḥ Šarīf Būstāman; c. 1811 – 23 April 1880) was a pioneering Romantic painter from the Dutch East Indies of Arab-Javanese ethnicity. He was considered to be the first "modern" artist from Indonesia (then the Dutch East Indies), and his paintings corresponded with nineteenth-century romanticism which was popular in Europe at the time. He also expressed his cultural roots and inventiveness in his work.

== Early life ==
Raden Saleh Syarif Bustaman was born in 1811 in the village of Terboyo, near Semarang on the island of Java in the Dutch East Indies (present-day Indonesia). He was born into a noble Hadhrami family; his father was Sayyid Husen bin Alwi bin Awal bin Yahya, whose family had come to Java via Surat in India in the seventeenth century. He was the grandson of Sayyid Abdullah Bustam through his mother, Raden Ayu Sarif Husen bin Alwi bin Awal. Through his sister, Roqayah, Raden Saleh was uncle by marriage to the famous religious leader Habib Ali Kwitang.

== Studies in Europe ==
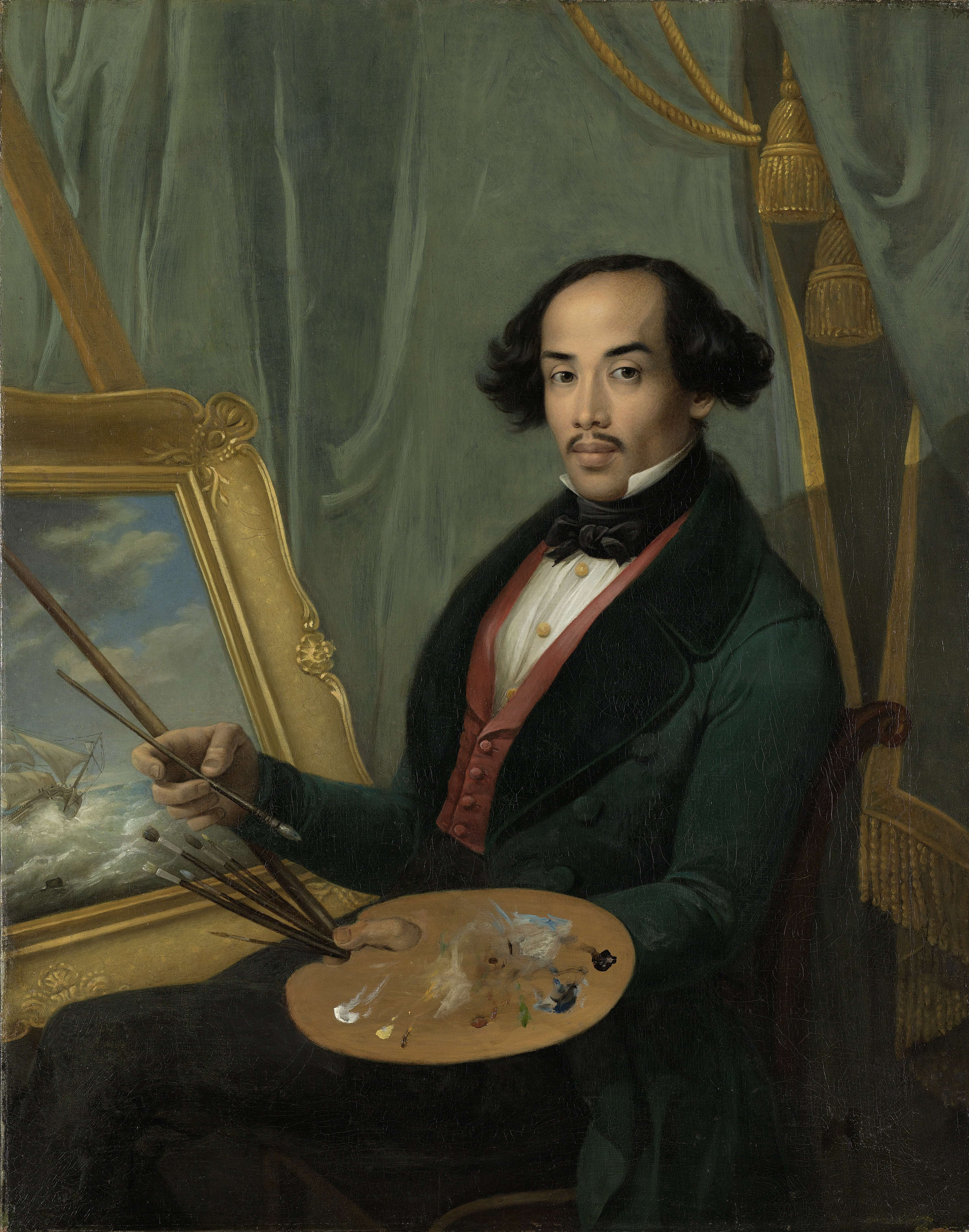
Raden Saleh, c. 1840, credited to Friedrich Carl Albert Schreuel

Young Raden Saleh was first taught in Bogor by the Belgian artist A.J. Payen. Payen acknowledged the youth's talent, and persuaded the colonial government of the Netherlands to send Raden Saleh to the Netherlands to study art. He arrived in Europe in 1829 and began to study under Cornelis Kruseman and Andreas Schelfhout.

It was from Kruseman that Raden Saleh studied his skills in portraiture, and later was accepted at various European courts where he was assigned to do portraits. While in Europe, in 1836 Saleh became the first indigenous Indonesian to be initiated into Freemasonry. From 1839, he spent five years at the court of Ernest I, Duke of Saxe-Coburg and Gotha, who became an important patron.

From Schelfhout, Raden Saleh furthered his skills as a landscape painter. Raden Saleh visited several European cities, as well as Algiers. In The Hague, a lion tamer named Henri Martin allowed Raden Saleh to study his lion, and from that his most famous painting of animal fights was created, which subsequently brought fame to the artist. Many of his paintings were exhibited at the Rijksmuseum in Amsterdam. Several of his paintings were destroyed when the Colonial Dutch pavilion in Paris was burnt in 1931.

== Return to the Dutch East Indies/Indonesia ==
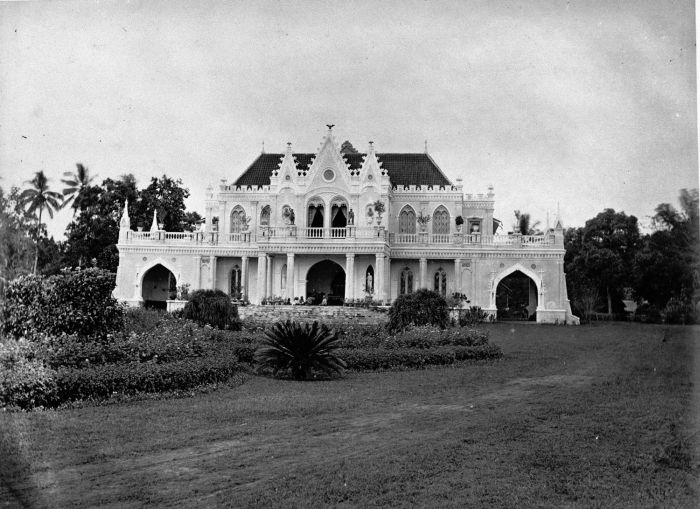
Photograph of Raden Saleh's house in Cikini in c. 1875–1885

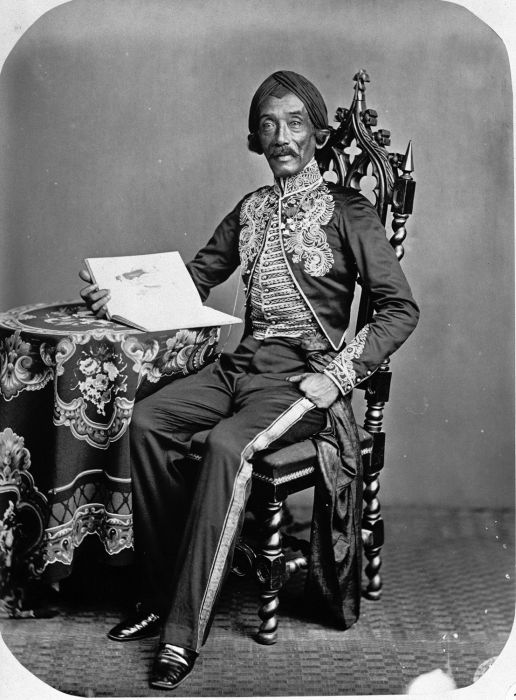
Raden Saleh in 1872

Raden Saleh returned to Dutch East Indies in 1852, after living in Europe for 20 years. He worked as conservator for the colonial collection of government art, and acted as court painter to the Governors-General. He also painted portraits of members of the colonial elite – European administrators, the Javanese priyayi or the Peranakan Chinese 'Cabang Atas' – as well as landscapes. Returning to Java, he expressed his uneasiness of living in the colonies, stating that "here, people only talks about coffee and sugar, then sugar and coffee" in one of his letters.

Upon returning, he married a wealthy Indo heiress of part-German extraction, Constancia von Mansfeld. His new wife financed the construction of Saleh's landhuis or country house on the private domain (particuliere land) that the couple had acquired, Cikini. Saleh's house was inspired architecturally by Callenberg Castle where he had stayed during his European travels c. 1844. Surrounded by vast grounds, most of them were converted into public gardens in 1862, and were closed in the turn of the century. In 1960, the Taman Ismail Marzuki was built in the former gardens. The house itself is still used today as a PGI Cikini Hospital and its name is immortalized in a street near the hospital.

On his first wife's death, Saleh remarried to a young aristocratic woman of the Yogyakarta Sultanate, Raden Ayu Danudirdja, in 1867 and subsequently moved to Bogor, where he rented a house near the Bogor Botanical Gardens with a view of Mount Salak. He later took his wife to travel in Europe, visiting countries such as the Netherlands, France, Germany, and Italy. His wife however contracted an illness while in Paris, the exact illness is still not known, and was so severe that they both immediately returned to Bogor. She died on 31 July 1880, following her husband's death three months earlier.

== Death ==
On 23 April 1880, Saleh suddenly fell sick. He claimed that he was poisoned by one of his servants, and subsequently died, as such it was reported in the Java-Bode newspaper, 24 April, 1880; however post-mortem examination showed that his circulatory system was disrupted due to a clot near his heart. Saleh was buried two days later in Kampung Empang, Bogor. As reported in the Java-Bode, 28 April 1880, his funeral was "attended by various landheeren [landlords] and Dutch officials, and even by curious students from nearby school."

== Artworks ==
While living in Paris, Saleh met Horace Vernet whose painting frequently took themes of African wildlife. Compared to Vernet, Saleh's painting seems to be more influenced by the romantic painter Eugène Delacroix. This could be seen in one of Saleh's work, Hunting Lion, 1840, which has similar composition to Delacroix's Liberty Leading the People. However, Werner Kraus, a researcher in the Southeast-Asian Art Center of Passau, Germany, said that Saleh "never mentioned Delacroix. Perhaps he saw Delacroix's, and possibly Vernet's, works during an exhibition."

Many European nobles were amazed by Raden Saleh's paintings, as were the Dutch, they did not expect a young painter from the Dutch East Indies (now Indonesia) to be able to master the techniques and capture the character of western painting, including the Sachsen-Coburg-Gotha, the family of Queen Victoria, and a number of governors-general such as Johannes van den Bosch, Jean Chrétien Baud, and Herman Willem Daendels. In 1883, an exhibition of Raden Saleh's paintings was held in Amsterdam to commemorate the third anniversary of Saleh's death, on the initiative of King Willem III and Ernst of Sachsen-Coburg-Gotha. Among them were the paintings Burning Forest, Buffalo Hunting in Java, and the Capture of Prince Diponegoro.

=== The Arrest of Pangeran Diponegoro ===
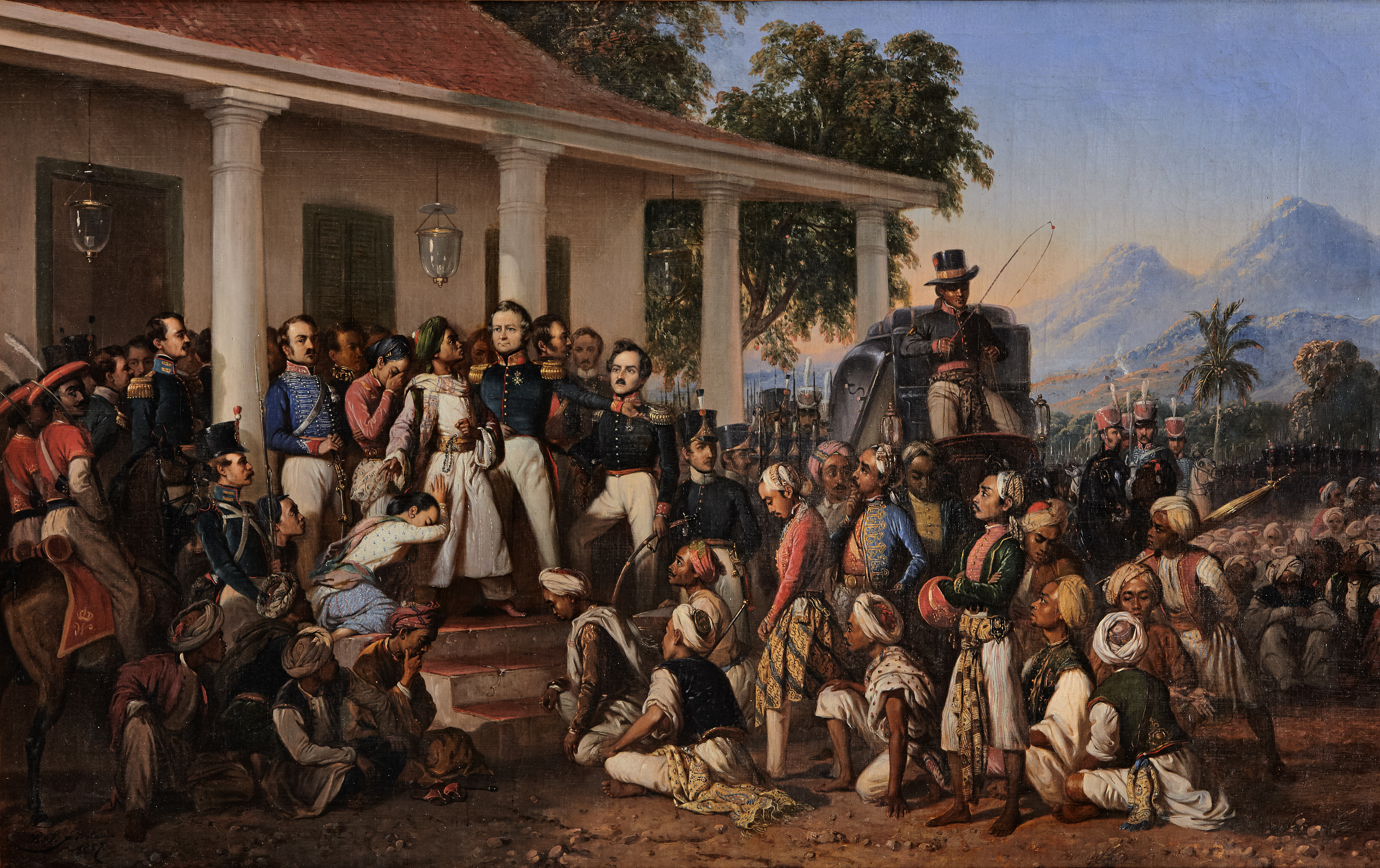
The Arrest of Pangeran Diponegoro, 1857, Merdeka Palace Museum, Jakarta.

Raden Saleh is particularly remembered for his historical painting, The Arrest of Pangeran Diponegoro, which depicted the betrayal of the rebel leader Prince Diponegoro by the colonial government, thus ending the Java War in 1830. The Prince was tricked into entering Dutch custody near Magelang, believing he was there for negotiations of a possible cease-fire. He was captured through treachery and later deported.

The event had been previously painted by a Dutch painter Nicolaas Pieneman, commissioned by Lieutenant General Hendrik Merkus de Kock. It is thought that Saleh saw this painting during his stay in Europe. Saleh made significant changes in his version of the painting; Pieneman painted the scene from the right, Saleh from the left. Pieneman depicts Diponegoro with resigned expression, while in Saleh's he appears to be outraged. Pieneman gave his painting the title Submission of Prince Diponegoro, while Saleh gave The Arrest of Pangeran Diponegoro. It is known that Saleh deliberately painted Diponegoro's Dutch captors with large heads to make them appear monstrous, as opposed to the more proportionally depicted Javanese.

Raden Saleh’s work has been regarded as a sign of incipient nationalism in what was then the Dutch East Indies / Indonesia. This can also be seen it the depiction of Diponegoro's men. Pieneman had never been to the Indies, and so depicted Diponegoro's men in a more Arabic fashion. Saleh's version has a more accurate depiction of native Javanese clothing, with some figures wearing batik and blangkon.

Saleh finished this painting in 1857 and presented it to Willem III of Netherlands in The Hague. It was returned to Indonesia in 1978 as a realization of a cultural agreement between the two countries in 1969, regarding the return of cultural items which were taken, lent, or exchanged to the Dutch in the previous eras. Even though the painting did not fall under any of those categories, because Saleh presented it to the King of the Netherlands and it was never in the possession of Indonesia, it was nevertheless returned as a gift from the Royal Palace of Amsterdam, and is currently displayed at the Merdeka Palace Museum in Jakarta.

=== Tomb ===
Decades later, somewhere in Bogor, Mas Adung, a descendant of the Sundanese nobleman Raden Panoeripan, was about to clear the weeds to the west of his house. Unexpectedly, after the weeds were cleared, two large tombstones were revealed with Dutch letters written on them. The tombstones were made of marble. The two tombstones were none other than the tombs of Raden Saleh and his wife. This incident occurred in 1923.

In 1953, President Sukarno visited Raden Saleh's tomb. Bung Karno once told Adun that "Raden Saleh was a great Indonesian painter who was widely known in Europe" and assigned the architect Friedrich Silaban to restore his tomb. Behind Raden Saleh's tomb actually lies the tomb of Raden Panoeripan and several of his descendants. It is said that Raden Panoeripan's tomb has been around since the 17th century. Raden Saleh's tomb is currently cared for and guarded by a caretaker who is a direct descendant of Raden Panoeripan.

=== Works ===
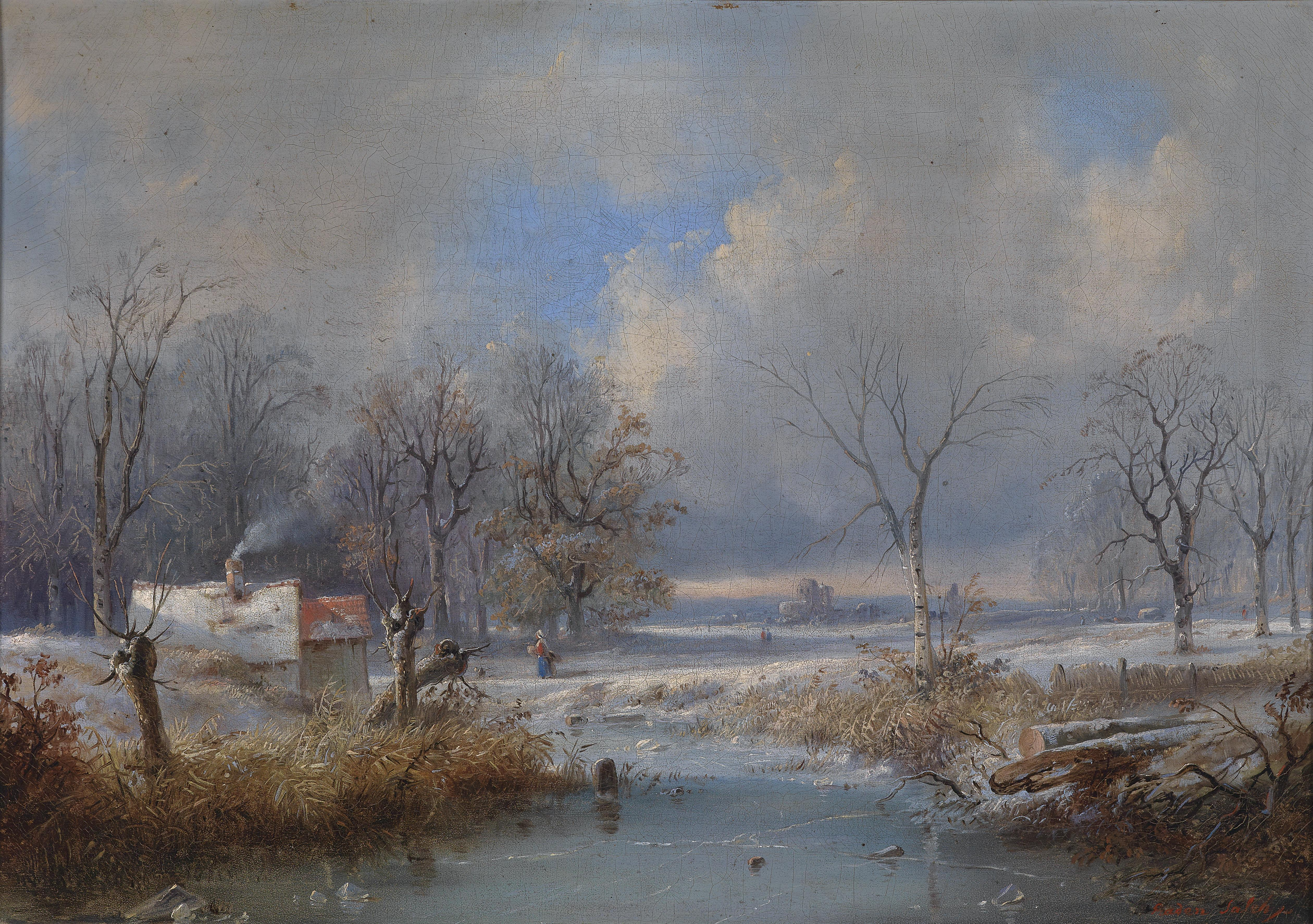
Winter Scenery (1830)

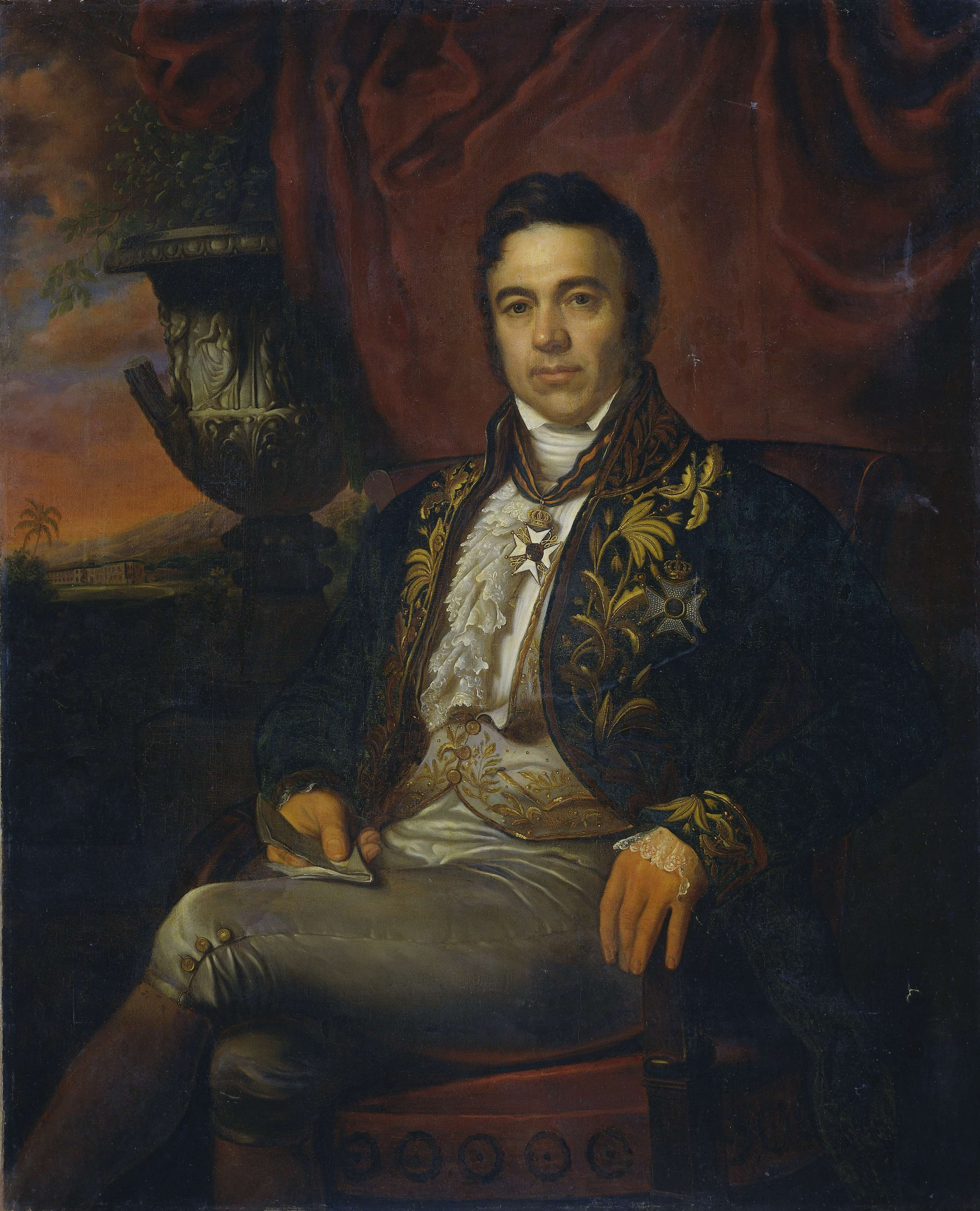
Portrait of Jean Chrétien Baud (1835)

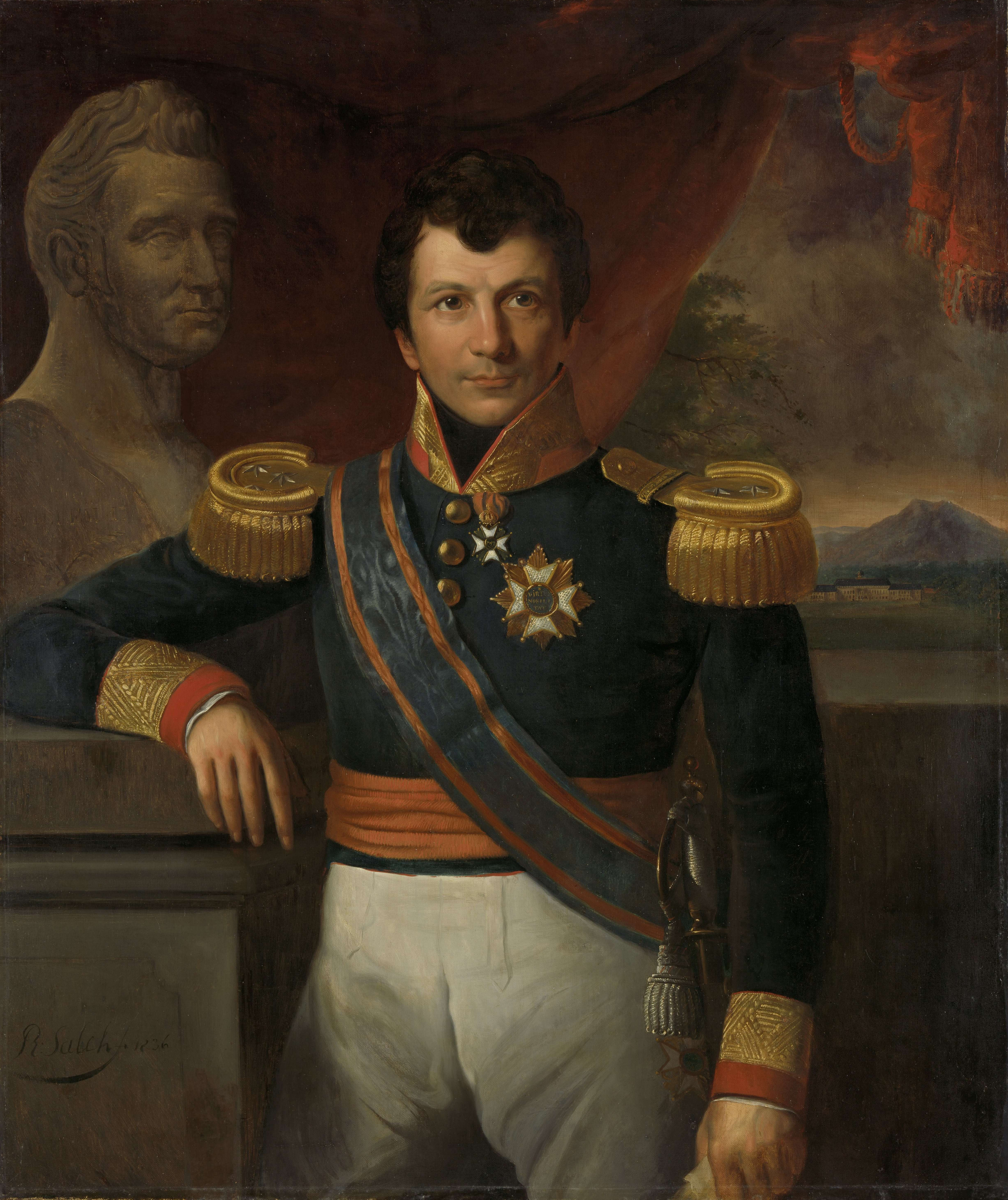
Portrait of Johannes van den Bosch (1836)

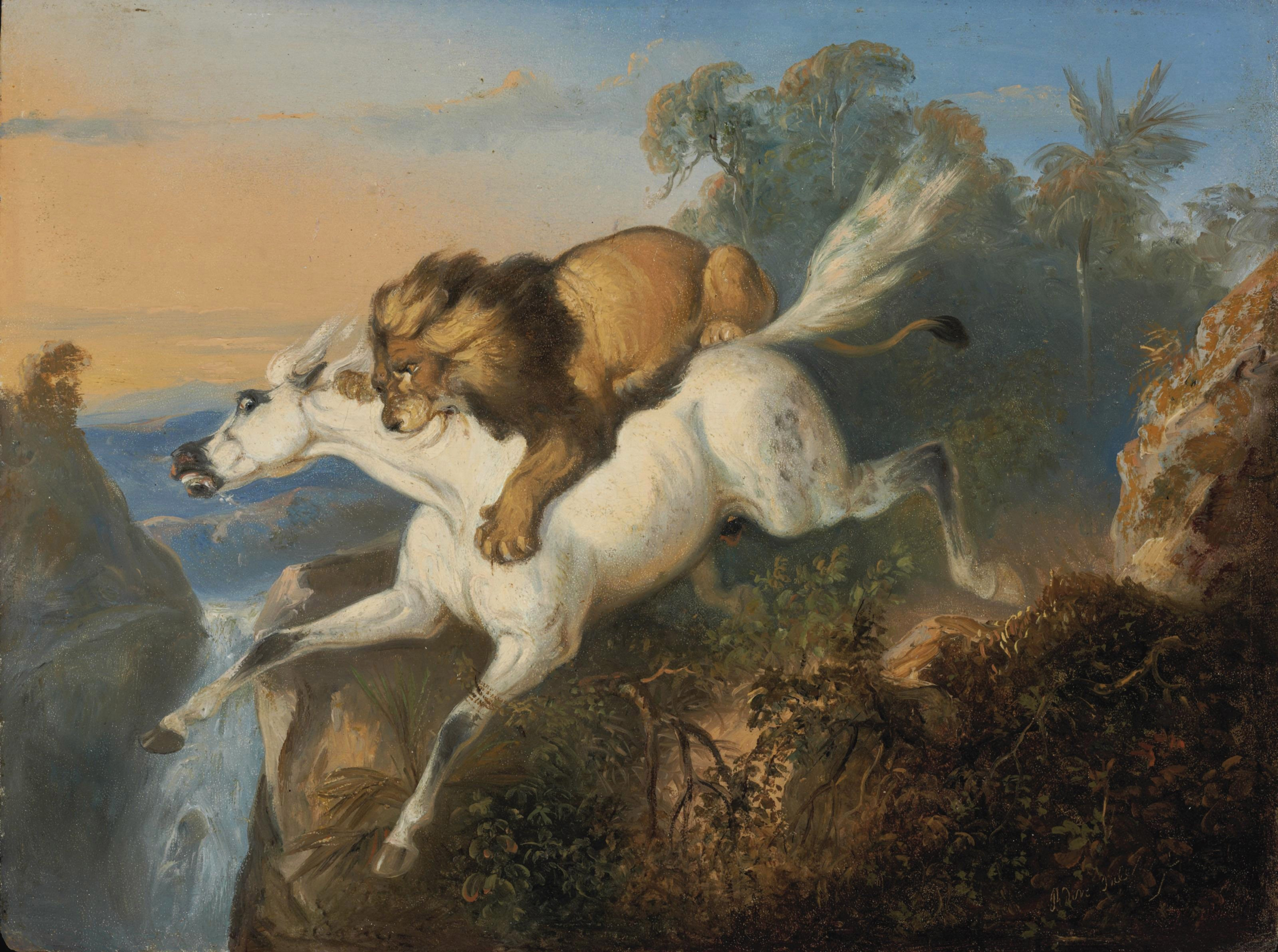
Lion attacking a horse (1840)

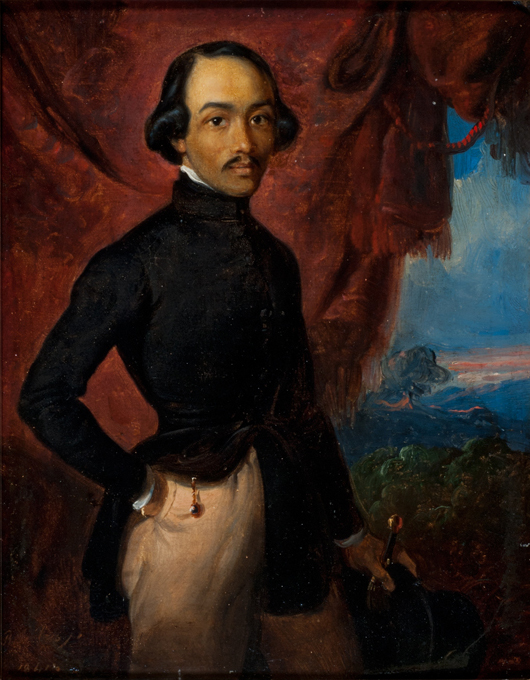
Self-portrait (1841)

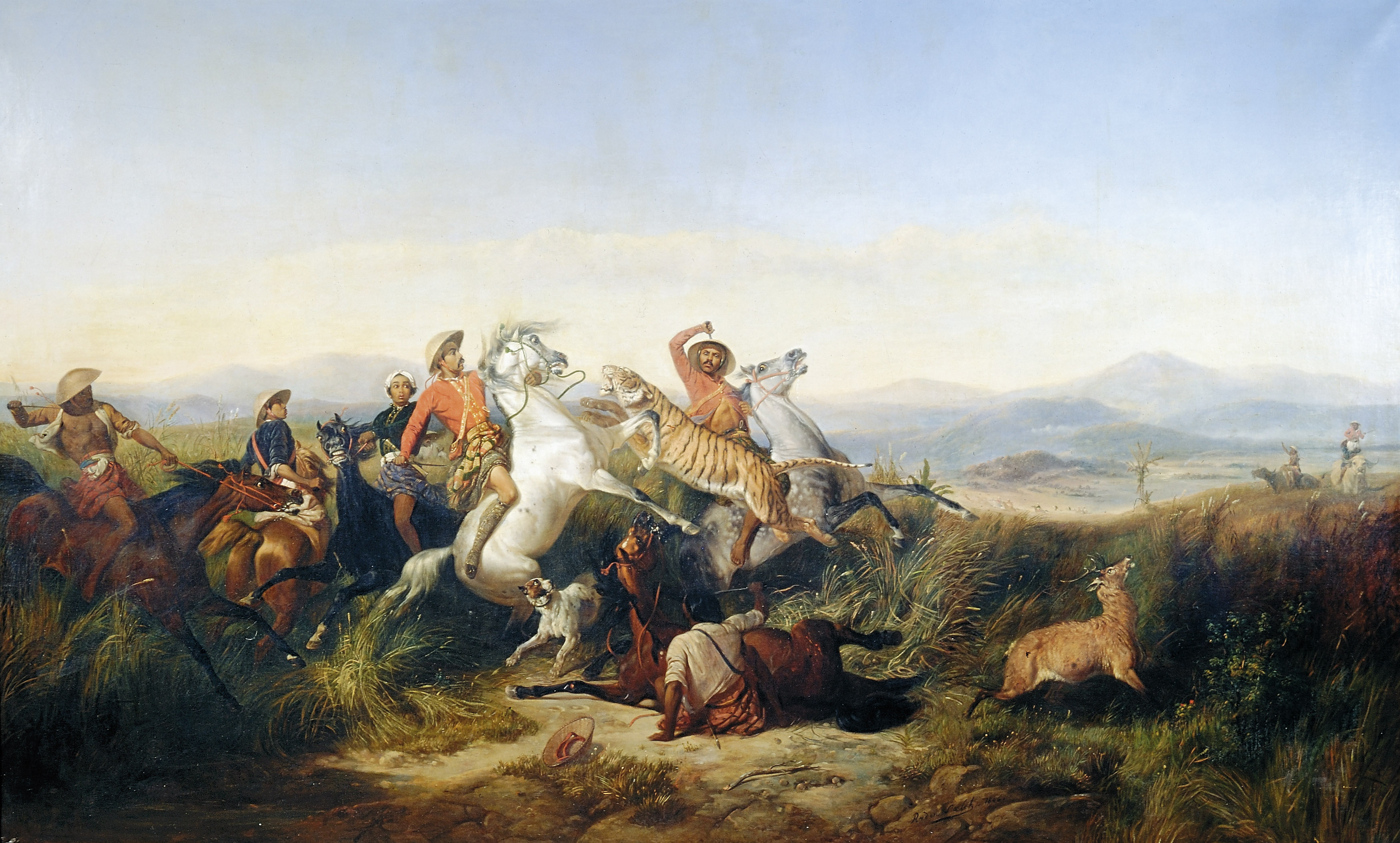
Deer Hunt (1846)

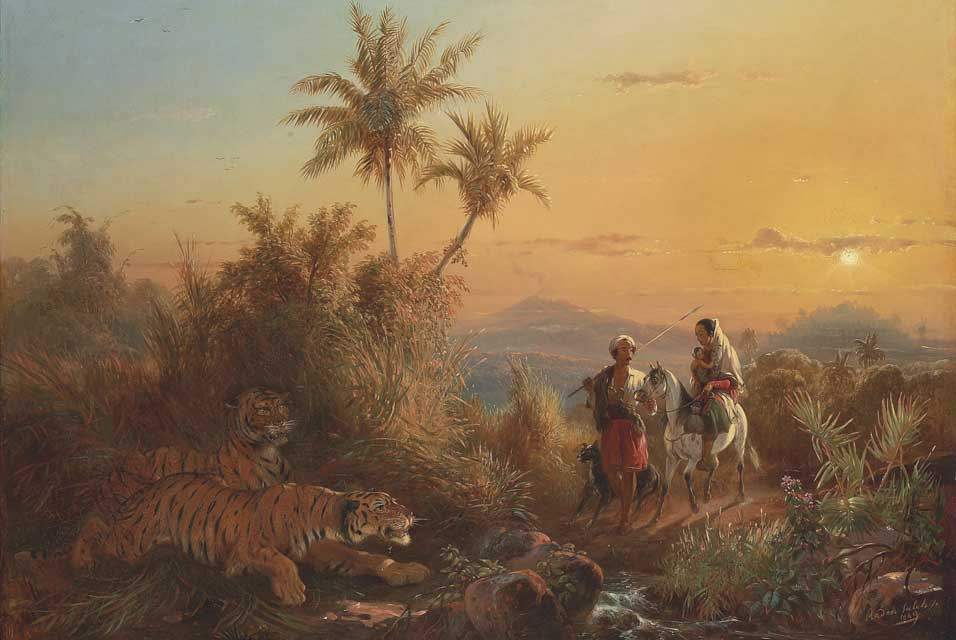
Javanese Landscape, with Tigers Listening to the Sound of a Travelling Group (1849)

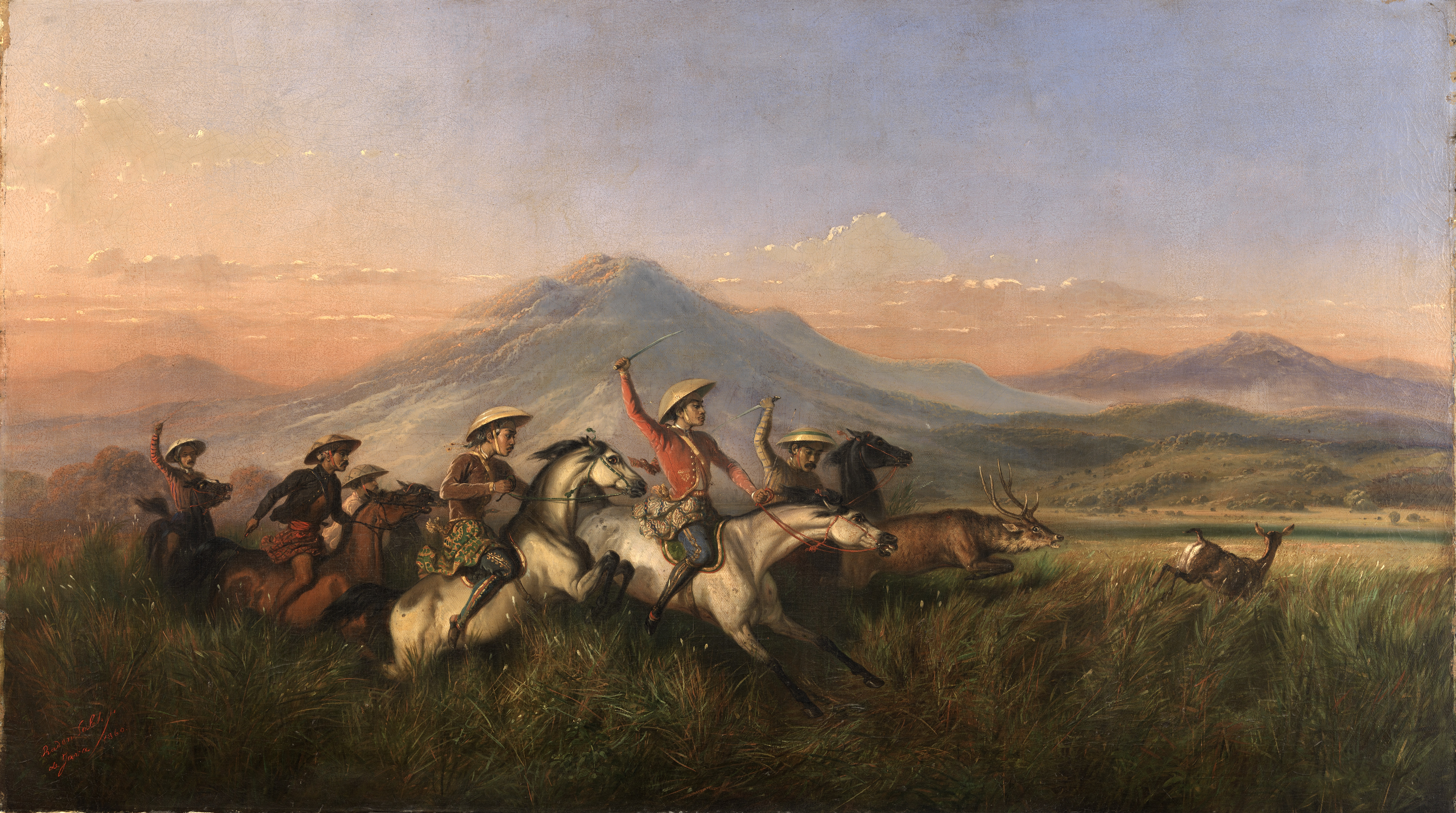
Six Horsemen Chasing Deer (1860)

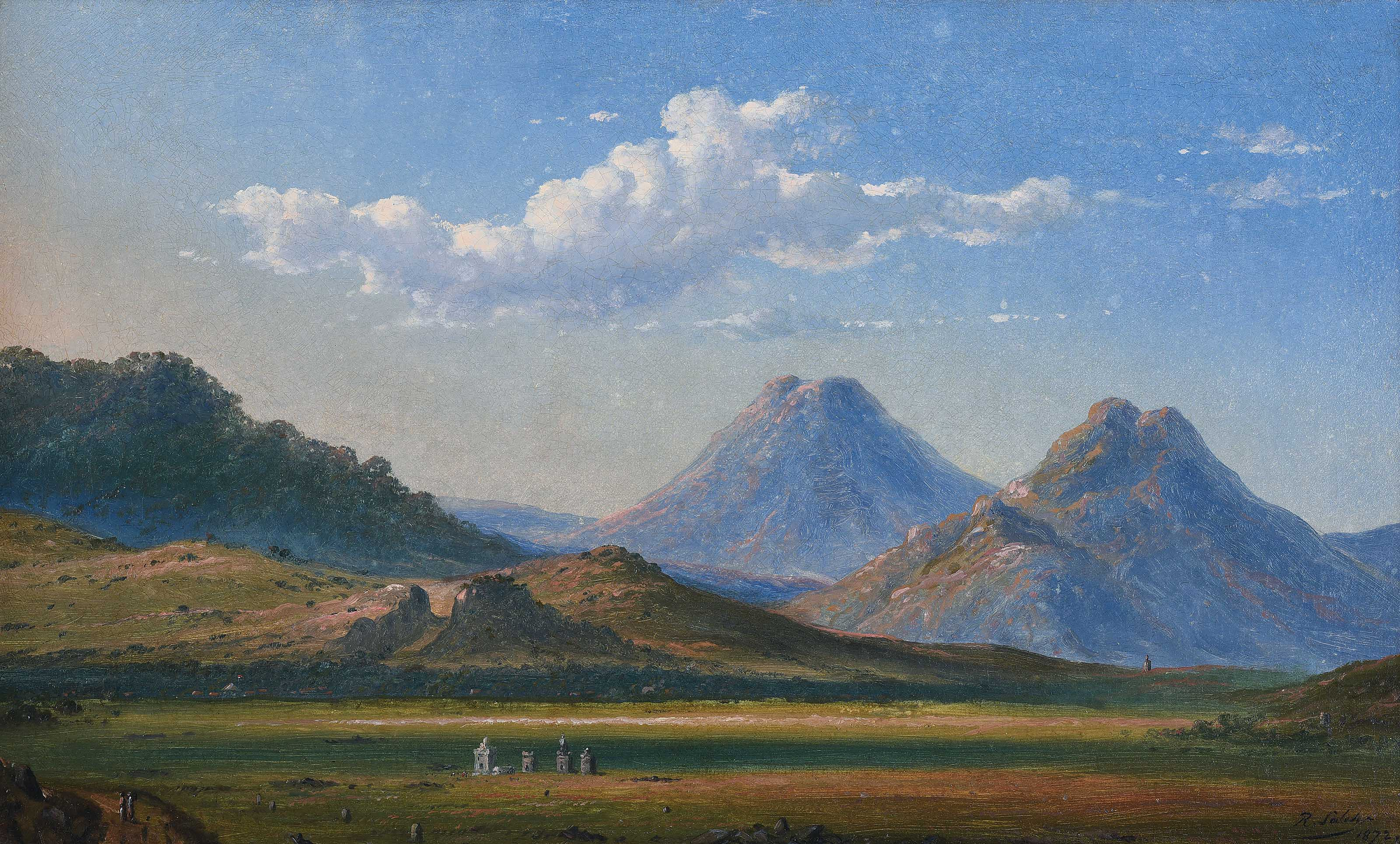
View of Dieng Plateau (1872)

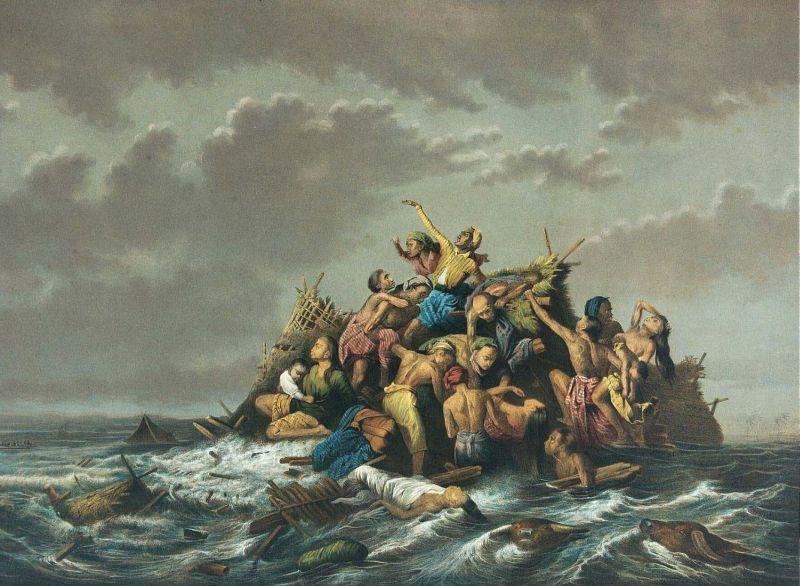
A Flood in Java (1865-1875), modelled after Géricault's The Raft of the Medusa

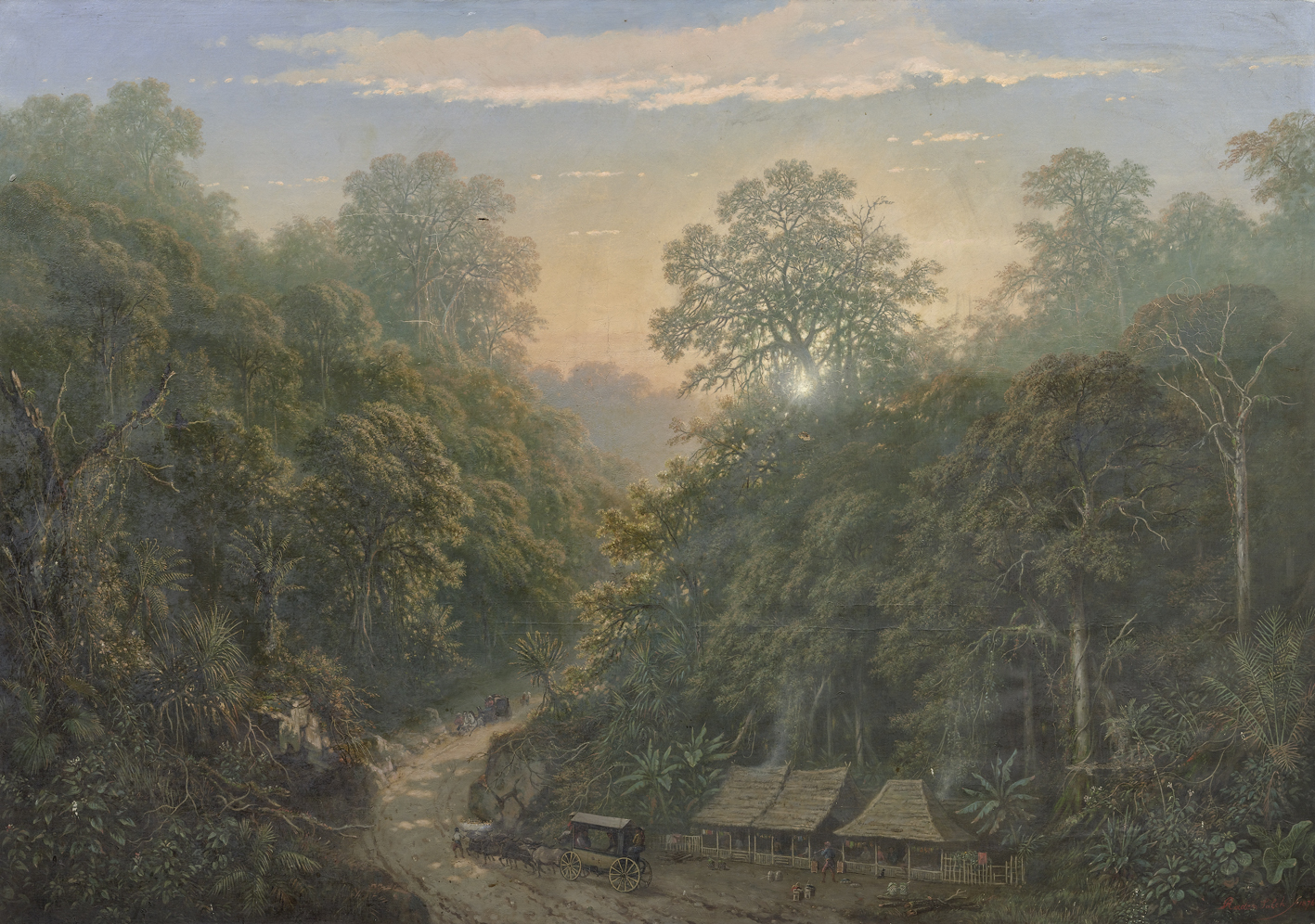
Javanese Mail Station (1876)

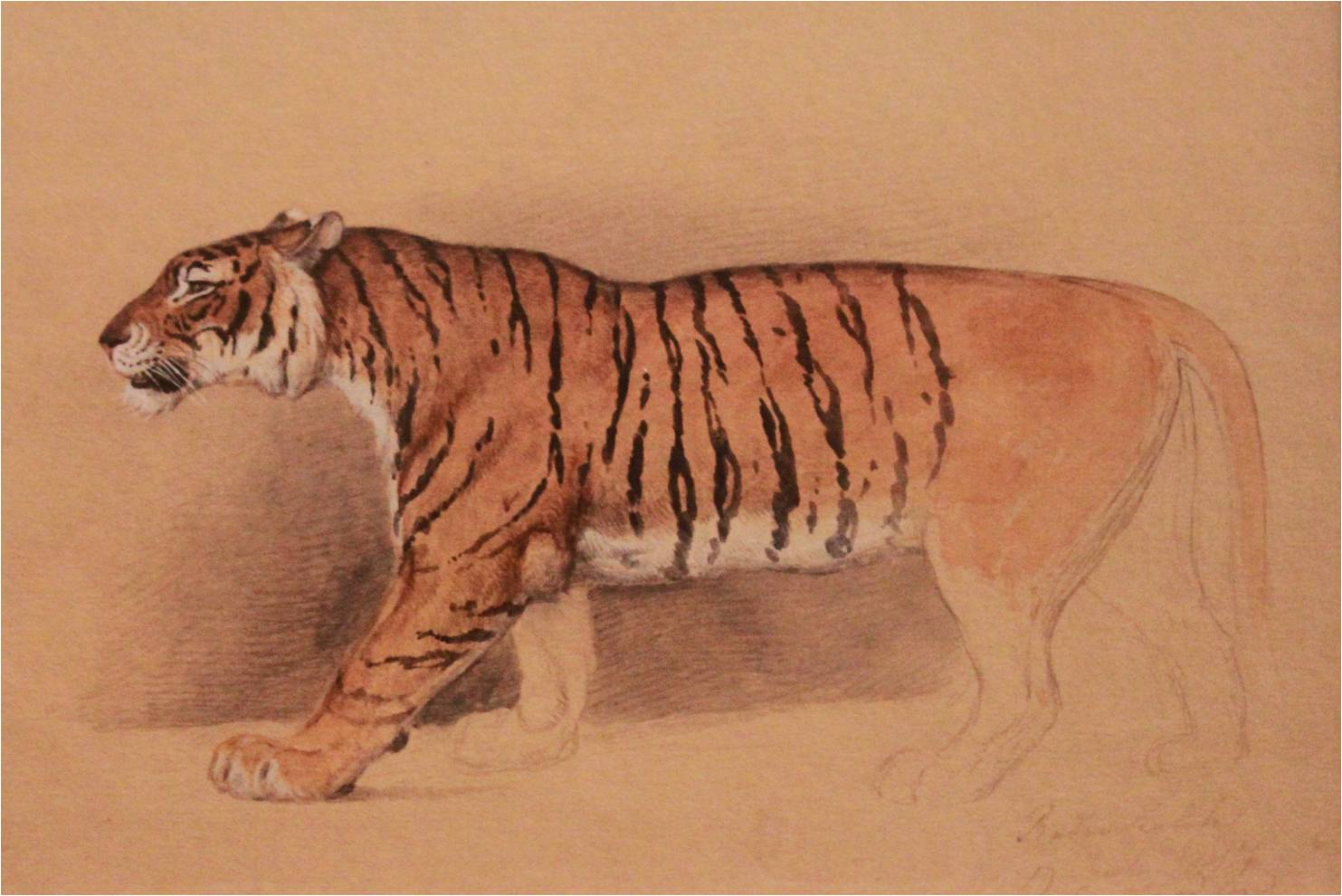
Watercolor study of a walking tiger

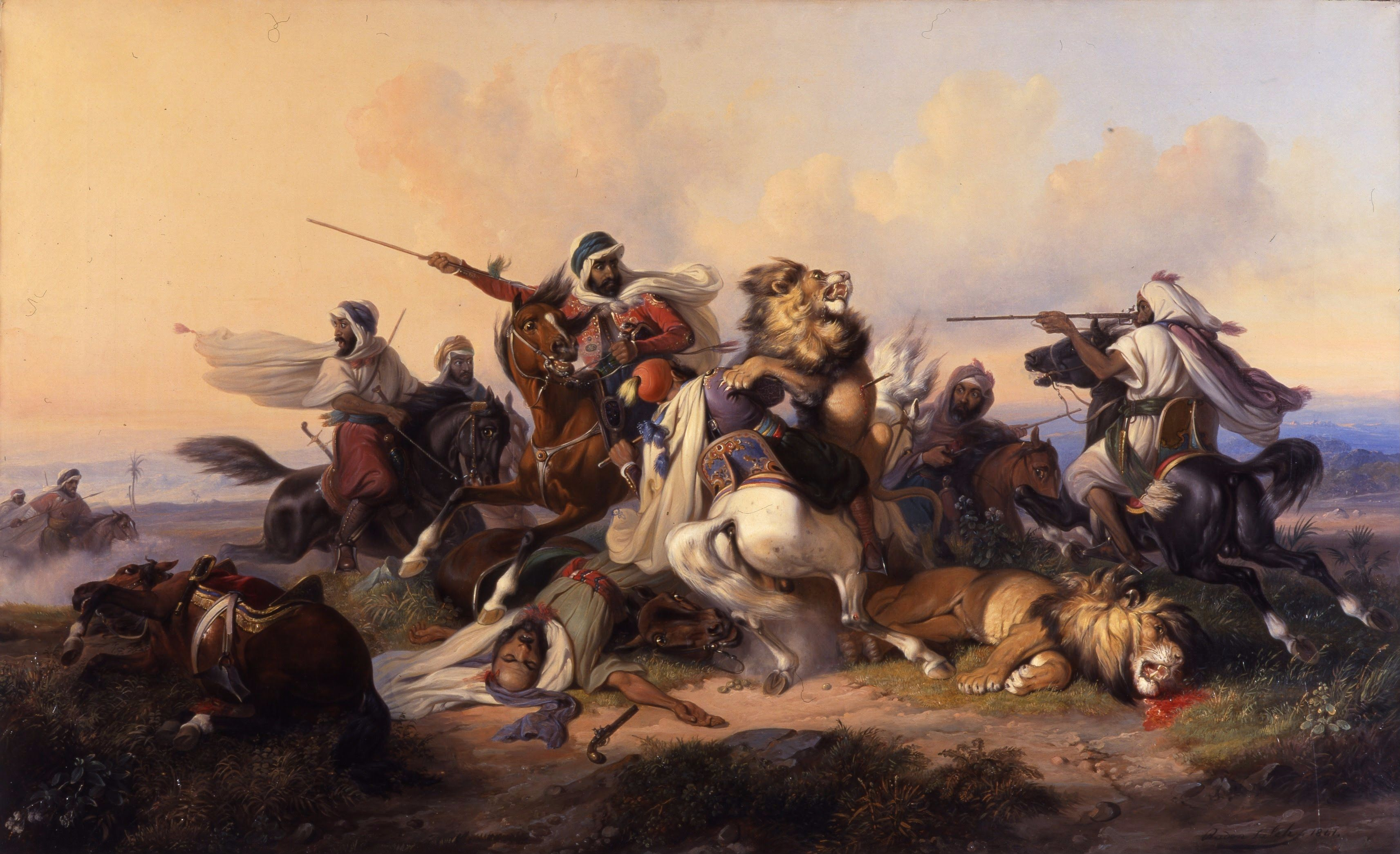
The Lion Hunt (1841)

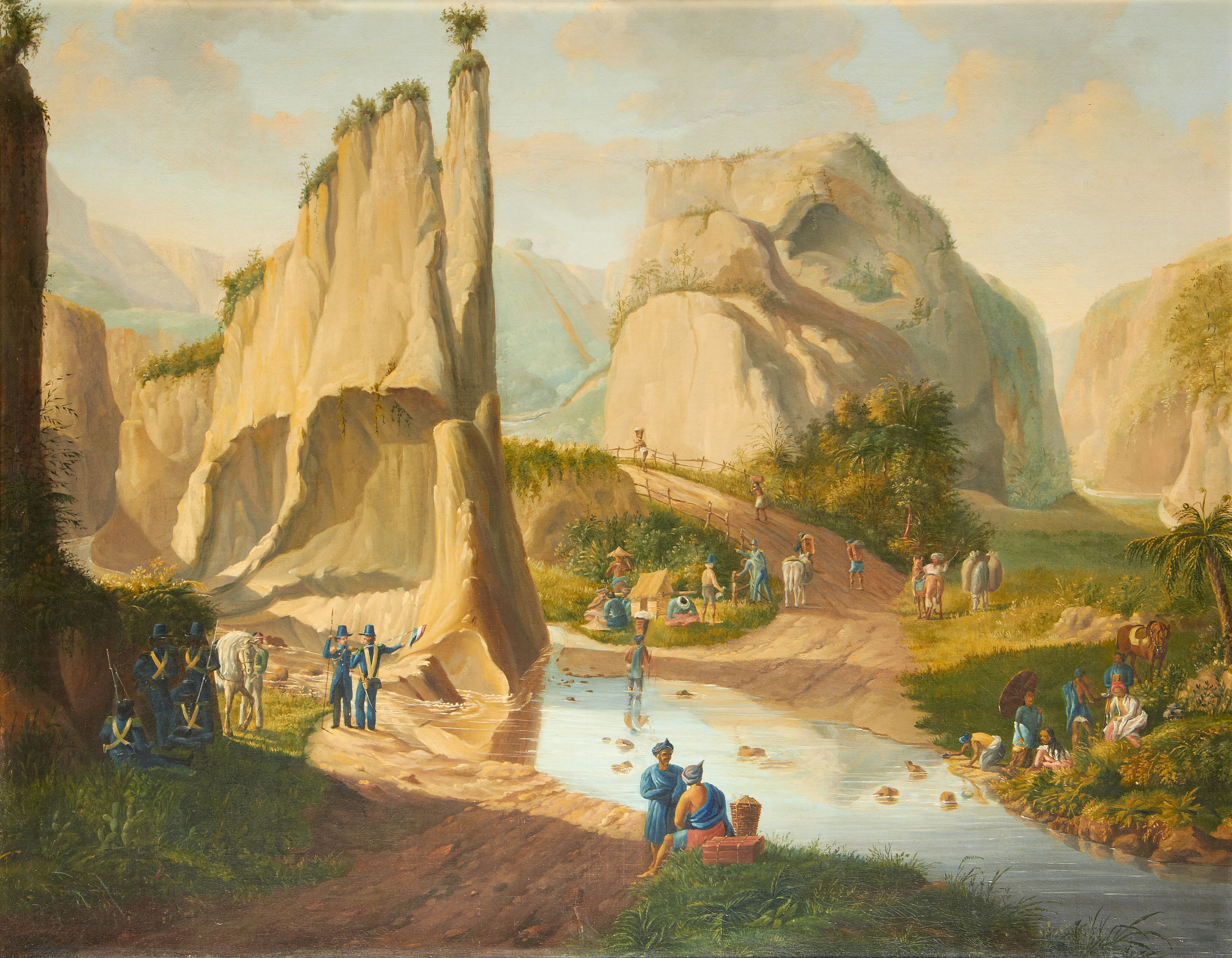
A landscape in the Dutch East Indie / Indonesia

== In popular culture ==
- Stealing Raden Saleh (Indonesian: Mencuri Raden Saleh) is a 2022 action thriller film directed by Angga Dwimas Sasongko and written by Sasongko and Husein M. Atmodjo. The film features a group of people who want to plan the theft of Indonesian painter Raden Saleh's masterpiece "The Arrest of Prince Diponegoro"
