= The Battle of Bautersem =

Painting by Nicolaas Pieneman

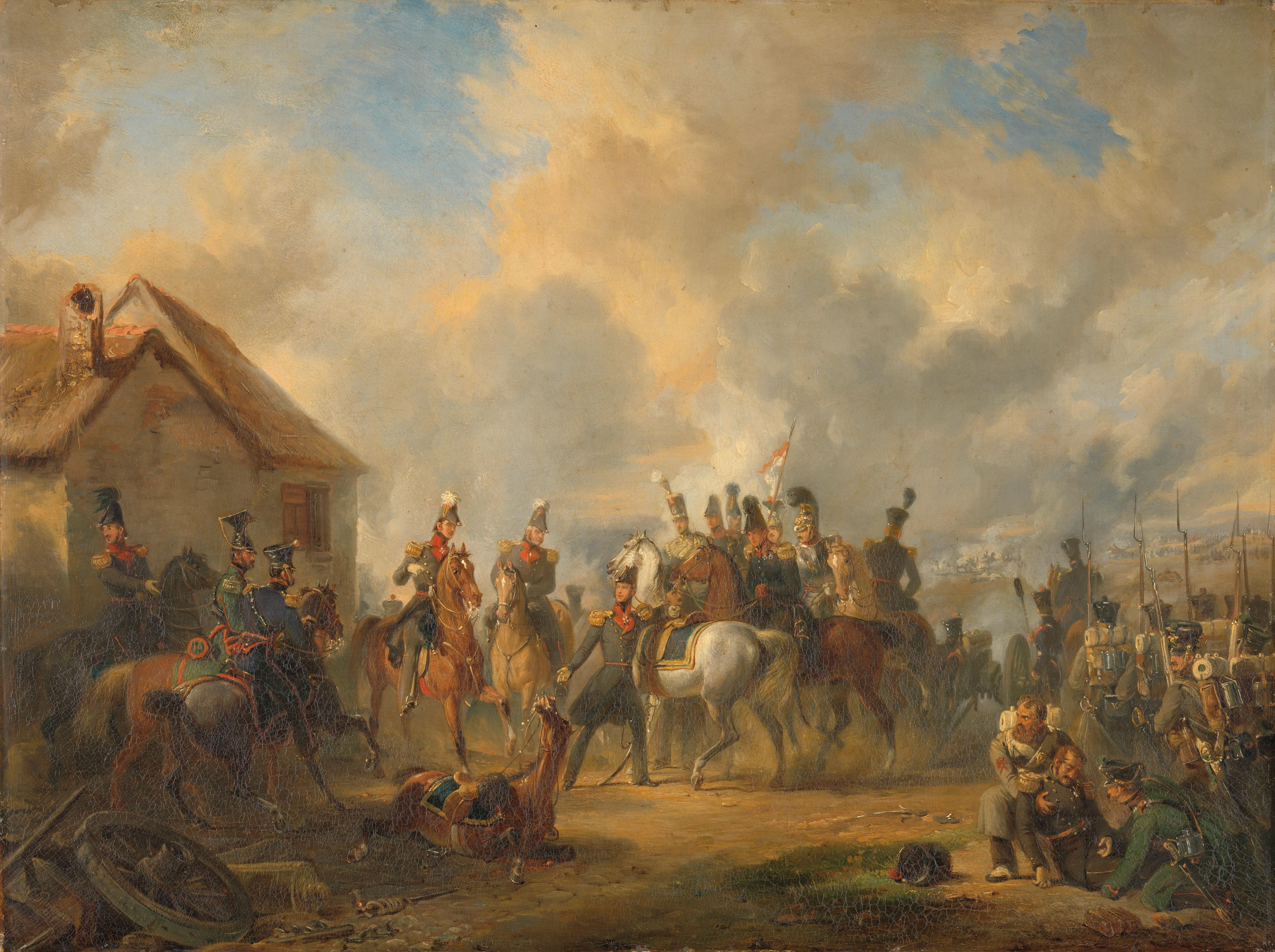
- Artist: Nicolaas Pieneman
- Year: 1833
- Medium: Oil on canvas
- Dimensions: 46 cm × 60.5 cm (18 in × 23.8 in)
- Location: Rijksmuseum, Amsterdam

The Battle of Bautersem (Dutch: De Slag bij Bautersem) is a painting of 1833 by the Dutch artist Nicolaas Pieneman featuring a scene from the Ten Days' Campaign of the Belgian Revolution. The title refers to an alternative name of the Battle of Leuven, fought in August 1831 near Boutersem in Flemish Brabant. It depicts the moment the horse of the Dutch commander William, Prince of Orange, was shot from under him, and he is shown about to mount another horse.

William led the Dutch Army to victory, defeating Belgian forces under the command of Leopold I. Although further progress was halted by the intervention of a French Army under Marshal Gérard, the battle was hailed as a patriotic Dutch triumph and a personal vindication for William. Pieneman was the son of the artist Jan Willem Pieneman and produced a number of scenes from Dutch history as well as portraits. Today the painting is in the collection of the Rijksmuseum in Amsterdam.

== Bibliography ==
- Op de Beeck, Johan. Het verlies van België. Overamstel Uitgevers, 2015.
- Koch, Jeroen, Van der Meulen, Dik & Van Zanten, Jeroen. The House of Orange in Revolution and War: A European History, 1772–1890. Reaktion Books, 2022.
