= Henry Marten =

Henry Marten may refer to:

- Henry Marten (politician) (c. 1562–1641), Tudor politician
- Henry Marten (regicide) (1602–1680), his son
- Sir Henry Martin, 2nd Baronet (1768–1842), cricketer
- Henry Marten (educator) (1872–1948), Provost of Eton

== See also ==
- Henry Martin (disambiguation)
