= Battle of Leuven =

Battle of Leuven may refer to:

- Battle of Leuven (891)
- Battle of Leuven (1831)
