= Harry Martin =

Harry Martin is the name of:

- Harry B. Martin (1873–1959), American cartoonist and golf writer
- Harry C. Martin (1854–1917), Wisconsin politician
- Harry L. Martin (1911–1945), soldier
- Harry S. Martin (born 1943), librarian and professor
- Harry Martin (field hockey) (born 1992), British field hockey player
- Harry Martin (cyclist) (1889–1922), Canadian cyclist
- Harry Martin (judge) (1920–2015), former Associate Justice of the North Carolina Supreme Court
- Harry Martin (urologist) (1890–1961), medical director of 20th Century Fox Studios and third husband of Louella Parsons

== See also ==
- Harry Martin (Shortland Street)
- Henry Martin (disambiguation)
- Harold Martin (disambiguation)
