= Friedrich Carl Albert Schreuel =

Friedrich Carl Albert Schreuel, also known as Frederik Karel Albert Schreuel and Jan Christian Aelbert Schreuel (14 June 1773 – 1853), was a Dutch-born painter.

== Life ==
Schreuel was born in Maastricht, the Dutch Republic, on 14 June 1773. He joined the Dutch military at a young age. He is recorded as painting by 1788 and eventually left the military to begin studying art, first in Berlin then, in 1805, in Dresden. He spent some time studying under Josef Grassi of the Dresden Academy and soon made a name for himself by painting portrait miniatures. One of his portraits, known from an oval engraving by C. Bolt, was of Frederick IV, Duke of Saxe-Gotha-Altenburg. Schreuel would also copy works held at the Gemäldegalerie Alte Meister in Dresden. By 1840 he had been appointed a professor of painting by the King of Saxony.

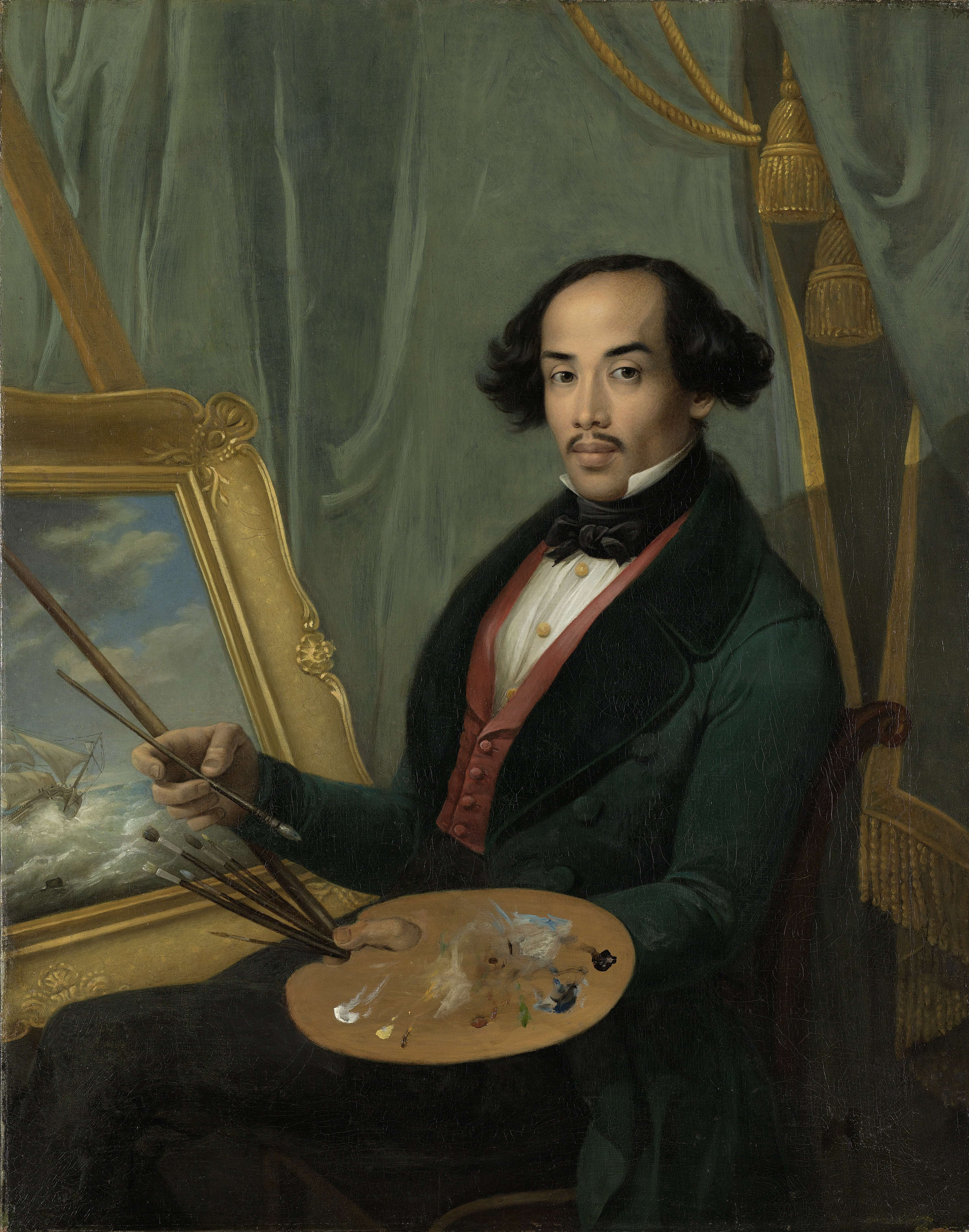
Portrait of Raden Saleh, c. 1840

Schreuel is believed to have painted the portrait of the Javanese artist Raden Saleh, who was then studying in Europe, that is now in the Rijksmuseum in Amsterdam. The painting dates to before 1841, because Saleh is depicted dressed as a European dandy, not as a Javanese prince, which was how he dressed beginning in that year. The painting was first recorded at the Dresden Academy exhibition, at which it was a critical success. However, it has also been attributed to Saleh himself; in 2005 the Rijksmuseum was still referring to the work as a self-portrait. The pose is one traditional in self-portraits, and no other portraits by Schreuel are known to have survived, while the style of his miniatures is different; however, this would be the only unsigned painting by Saleh, he knew Schreuel (whom he called 'Schruil'), and the brushwork is freer than is characteristic of his work. According to the Tropenmuseum, as of 2012 they have the only known self-portrait by Saleh.

Schreuel died in Dresden, Germany, in 1853.
