= Conradijn Cunaeus =

Dutch painter (1828–1895)

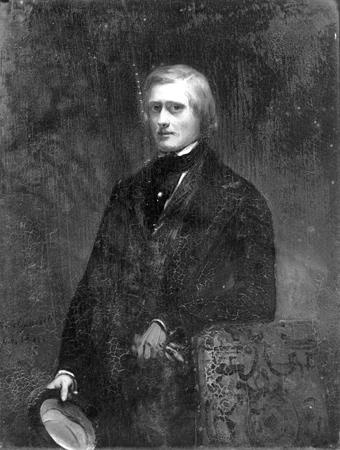
- Portrait by Hendrik Hollander in the Centraal Museum of Utrecht, 1849
- Born: 1 November 1828; Dendermonde, United Kingdom of the Netherlands
- Died: 5 September 1895 (aged 66); Nieuwer-Amstel

Conradijn Cunaeus (1828–1895) was a Dutch animalier painter and lithographer.

== Life ==
Cunaeus was born on 1 November 1828 in Dendermonde, which at that time was in the United Kingdom of the Netherlands. He studied at the Koninklijke Academie van Beeldende Kunsten in Amsterdam from 1844 to 1849, and also under Nicolaas Pieneman. He lived from 1854 to 1868 in Koudekerk aan den Rijn, from 1870 to 1888 in Amsterdam, and thereafter in the former municipality of Nieuwer-Amstel on the outskirts of Amsterdam. He died there on 5 September 1895.

== Work ==
He was principally a painter of animals, particularly of dogs; he also painted landscapes with figures, hunting and mountain scenes, interiors and genre paintings. He worked in oils and in watercolour, and made drawings and lithographs.

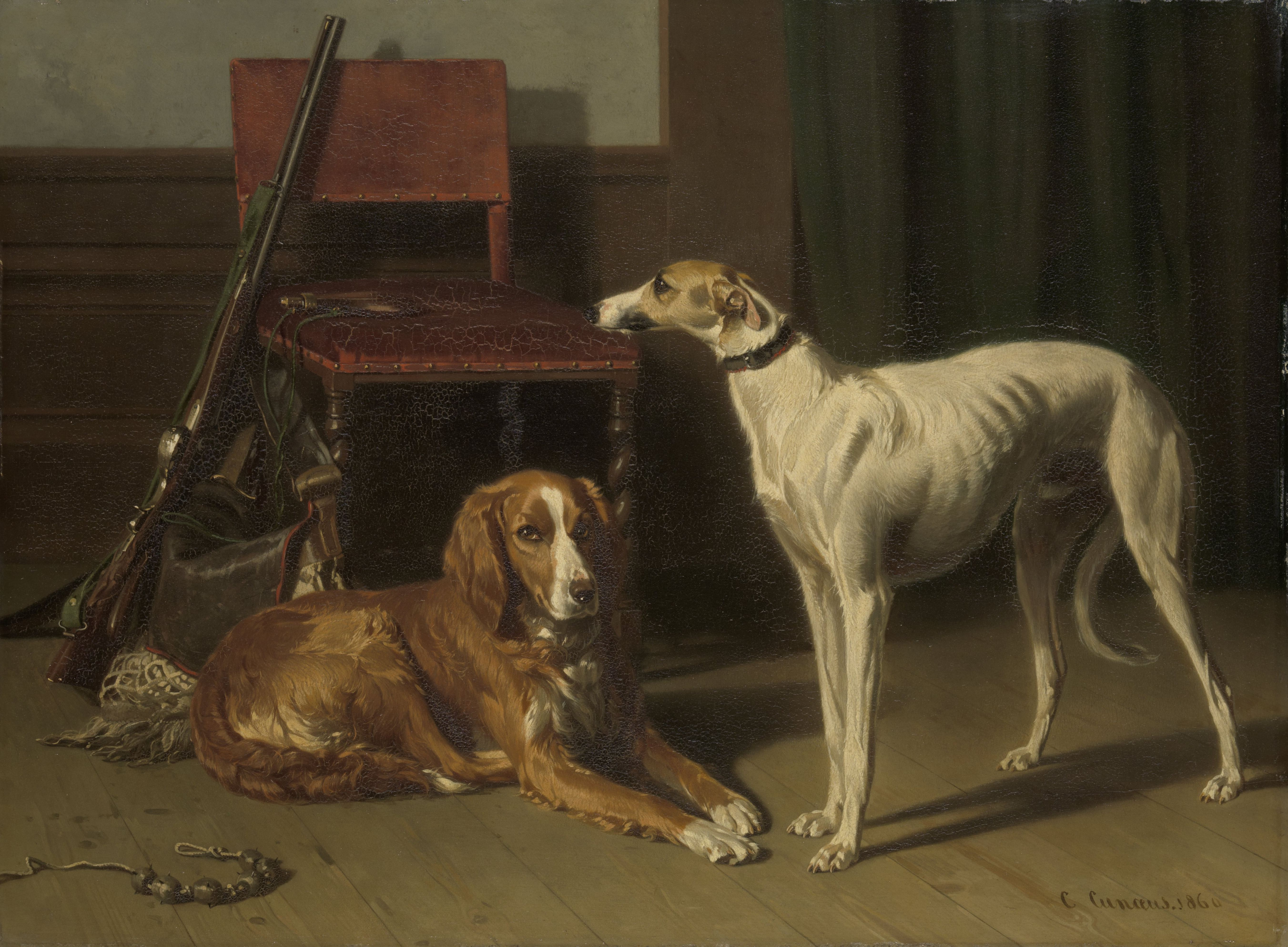
Hunting Companions, 1860, in the Rijksmuseum, Amsterdam

Elephas maximus, print, 1849, in the collections of the University of Amsterdam
