= Henri Martin (lion tamer) =

French lion tamer (1793–1882)

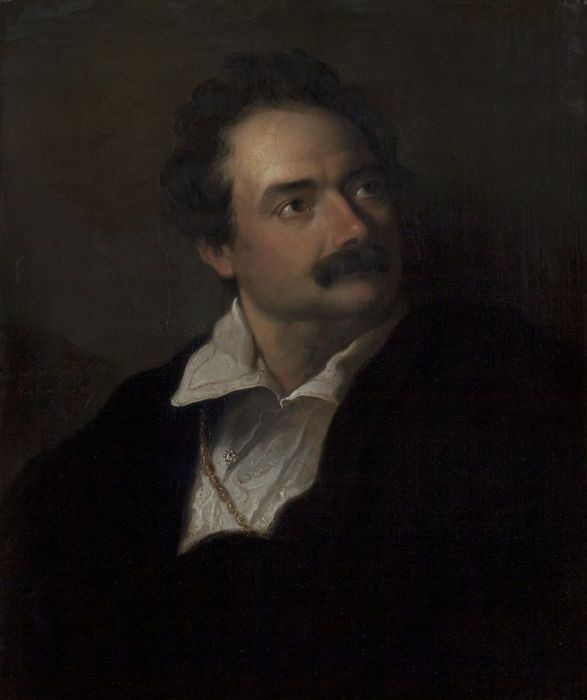
- Portrait by Raden Saleh
- Born: Pierre Henri Martin; January 10, 1793; Marseille, France
- Died: April 8, 1882 (aged 89); Rotterdam, Netherlands
- Occupation: Animal trainer
- Known for: Lion taming

Pierre Henri Martin (January 10, 1793 – April 8, 1882) was a French showman and lion tamer who became the first director of the Rotterdam Zoo.

== Early life ==
Pierre Henri Martin was born in Marseille, France, in 1793.

== Career ==
During his time working with a circus, Martin honed his natural ability to control animals by mastering the art of horse training, teaching his horses the complete range of professional tricks. After establishing himself as a horse trainer, he advanced to taming wild animals.

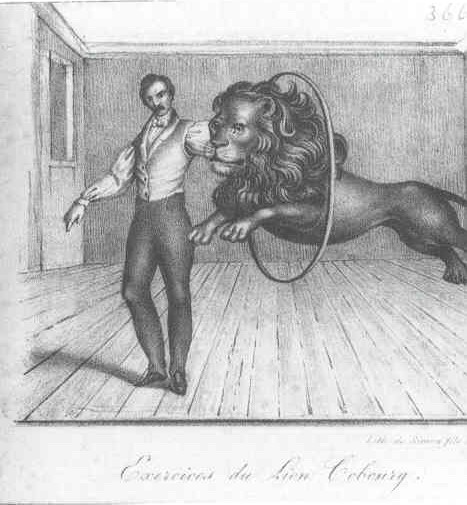
Martin trains his lion Coburg (c. 1820–1830); Gemeentearchief Amsterdam

Martin established his menagerie in 1829 at the Porte Saint-Denis. The menagerie Martin established at Rue Basse-St Denis contained two lions, a Bengal tiger, a hyena, and a llama. The training of his royal tiger took eight months of work, and he taught the hyena the trick of retrieving his gloves.

Between 1829 and 1831, the French animal trainer made appearances in Paris. He starred in Les Lions de Mysore at the Cirque Olympique on April 21, 1831, marking the first time wild animals were presented at a circus venue.

He visited London and the other provinces of England from 1831 to 1832. He performed at the Drury Lane theatre in 1831.

Before long, he began touring Holland with his show The Lions of Mysore.

Around 1836, he met the Indonesian painter Raden Saleh in The Hague. Saleh painted Martin's portrait, a gesture that secured him permission to sketch Martin's circus animals.

Martin retired in 1840.

Martin's zoological studies earned him a reputation that extended to professional naturalists. He became the first director of the Rotterdam Zoo, serving from 1857 to 1866.

== Death ==
Martin died in April 1882, in Rotterdam, Netherlands.

== Legacy ==
Martin was one of the first famous lion tamers.

== Gallery ==
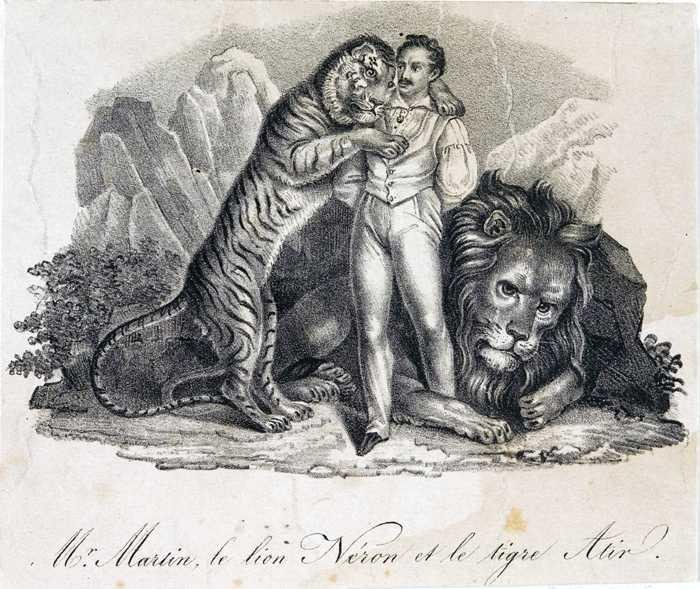
Martin, the lion Nero and the tiger Atir, (c. 1800–1850)

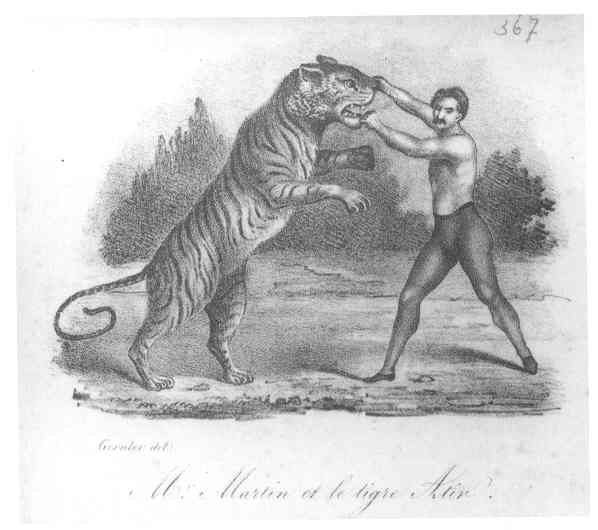
Martin, tamer, with his tiger Atir (c. 1820s)
