= Martinizing Dry Cleaning =

Dry cleaning franchise in Michigan, US

Martinizing Cleaners is a dry cleaning franchise based in Naples, FL and was founded in 1949. Clean Brands, LLC, the parent company, is the largest dry cleaning franchise in the world, with over 400 franchised stores worldwide.

== History ==
The company was initially called One Hour Martinizing due to its commitment to provide dry cleaning services within a one-hour timeframe. This concept was pioneered in New York in 1949 by a chemist named Henry Martin, who had discovered a non-flammable solvent. At the time, flammable solvents were used in dry cleaning, which meant that garments would be left by the customer in-store, sent to a separate production facility to be cleaned and pressed, before returning to store for collection several days later. The discovery of the non-flammable solvent and its subsequent adoption revolutionized the dry cleaning industry as dry cleaning plants could be more conveniently located, which led to quicker processing times, and so better serving the needs of customers.

Martin Equipment Company was subsequently founded to manufacture specialized dry cleaning equipment, later becoming part of American Laundry Machinery in Ohio. The number of Martinizing franchises saw significant growth during the 1950s and 1960s, with franchisees required to pay a fixed annual fee and adhere to specific equipment and procedural standards. During this period, trademark slogans became established, such as "Fresh as a Flower in Just One Hour" and "the Most in Dry Cleaning".

Martinizing Dry Cleaning was bought by the Michigan-based company, The Huntington Company of Berkley, on November 7, 2014. In April, 2021, the Martinizing brands (Martinizing, 1-800-DryClean, Pressed4Time, Dry Cleaning Station and BizzieBox) were sold to Clean Brands.

== Clean Brands, LLC ==
Based in Naples, Florida, Clean Brands, LLC is the owner of the following brands: Lapels Cleaners; Martinizing Cleaners; 1-800-DryClean, Pressed4Time, Dry Cleaning Station and Bizziebox. Collectively, the brands have 400 plus stores in 40 states and nine countries. Clean Brands corporate office is located at 711 5th Avenue South, Naples, FL 34102 Clean Brands
