= Harold Martin (dragster driver) =

American drag racer in the IHRA series

Harold Martin is an American drag racer in the IHRA series. He drives a Pro-Modified Pontiac Grand AM and is sponsored by ACDelco. In addition to driving competitively, he is president and CEO of Martin Technologies, a company creating technological solutions for automotive applications.

== Career ==
Starting out as a General Motors engineer, Martin began working with various motorsports teams, making his racing debut in 2000 in the IHRA Pro-Modified division.

Martin’s company was founded in 1996 as Martin Motorsports, LLC, dab Martin Technologies, and was instrumental in the creation of EFI in drag racing (electronic fuel injection), leading to his self-bestowed nickname of the “EFI Wizard.” Their engines, (Martin racing engines) produce between 1200 and over 2,500 horsepower.

In addition, Martin holds 10 global patents, and has been profiled by CNN (February 2001), Speed, Style, and Sound magazine (May 2004), and Ebony magazine (June 2004).

Martin has presented many times at various speaking engagements including Eton Academy, Jackson Community College, Hampton Middle School, and the Advanced Engine Technology Conference. He is currently helming an ACDelco-sponsored scholarship program for high school seniors interested in vocational/trade school.
