= Nicolaas Pieneman =

Dutch painter (1809–1860)

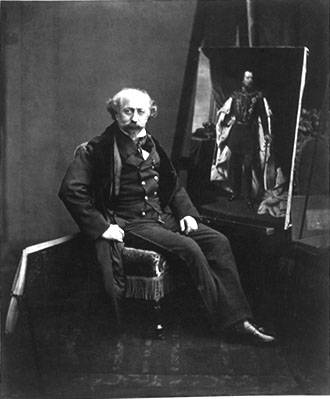
- Nicolaas Pieneman in 1859
- Born: 1 January 1809; Amersfoort, Kingdom of Holland
- Died: 30 December 1860 (aged 51); Amsterdam, Netherlands

Nicolaas Pieneman (Dutch pronunciation: [ˈnikoːlaːs ˈpinəˌmɑn]; 1 January 1809 – 30 December 1860) was a Dutch painter, art collector, lithographer, and sculptor.

== Biography ==
Nicolaas Pieneman was born on 1 January 1809 in Amersfoort in the Kingdom of Holland. He was the son of painter Jan Willem Pieneman.

Pieneman studied under his father and also at the Royal Academy of Fine Arts in Amsterdam; he was a pupil of Jean Baptiste Madou. He specialised in paintings of recent history and in portraits. He was a friend of William II of the Netherlands; he painted the king's inauguration in 1840, and many members of the royal family. His pupils were Jan Daniël Beijnon, Johannes Arnoldus Boland, Conradijn Cunaeus, Bernard te Gempt, Hendrik Hollander, Willem Johann Martens, Johan Heinrich Neuman, Jan Frederik Tack, and Antonie Frederik Zürcher.

In July 1855, Jan Hendrik Donkel Curtius (the Opperhoofd in Nagasaki, Japan) recorded the presentation of an oil portrait of King Willem III by Pieneman, together with the steamship Soembing.

Pieneman died on 30 December 1860 in Amsterdam in the Netherlands.

== Honours and affiliations ==
He was a member fourth class of the Royal Netherlands Academy of Arts and Sciences and by virtue of this, from 1852 of Natura Artis Magistra. He was a member of the Society Arti et Amicitiae.

He was a knight of the Order of the Netherlands Lion, a Commander of the Order of Adolphe of Nassau and appointed to the Order of the Polar Star.

== Works ==
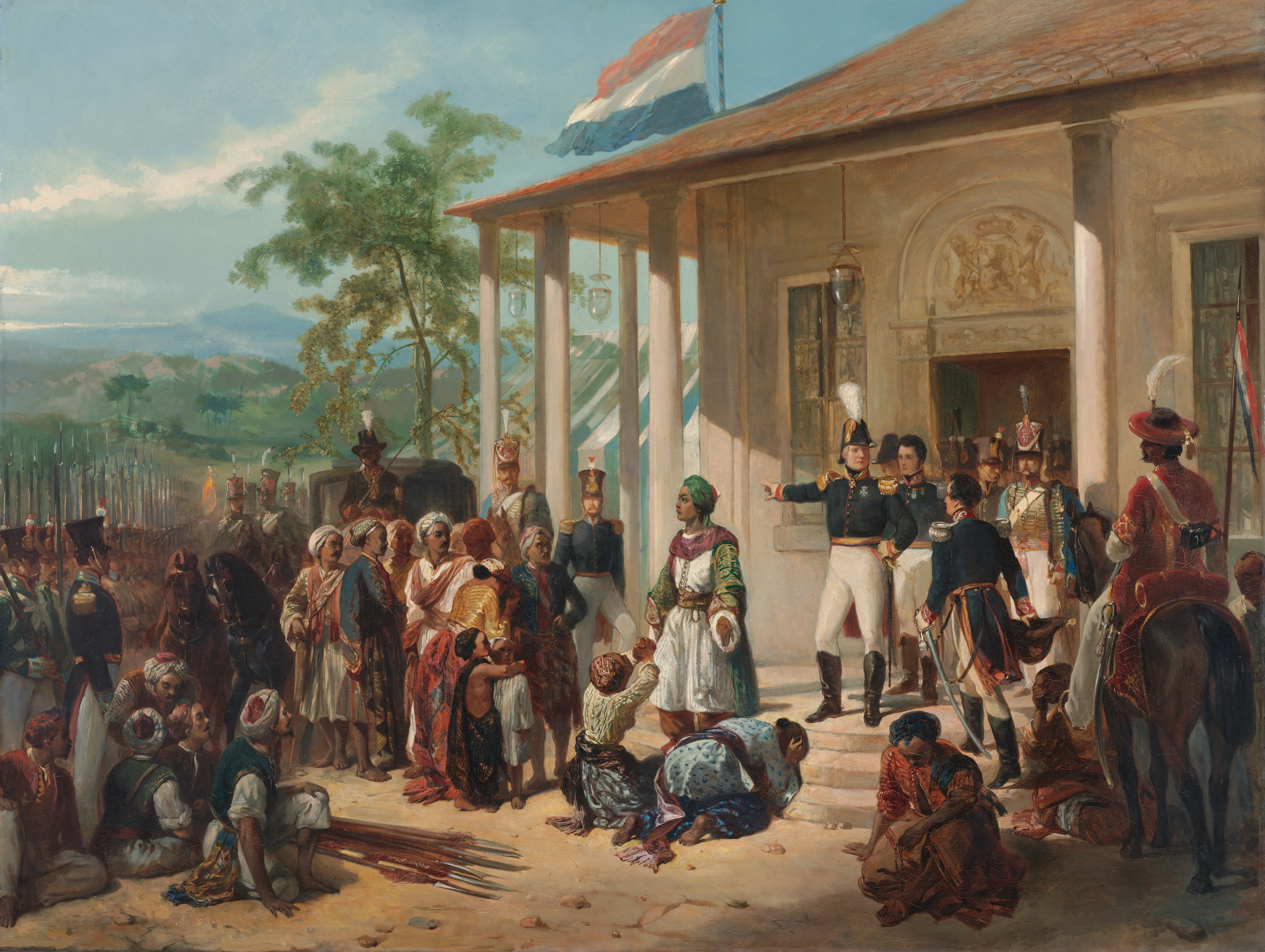
The Submission of Prince Dipo Negoro to General De Kock (c. 1830–1835)

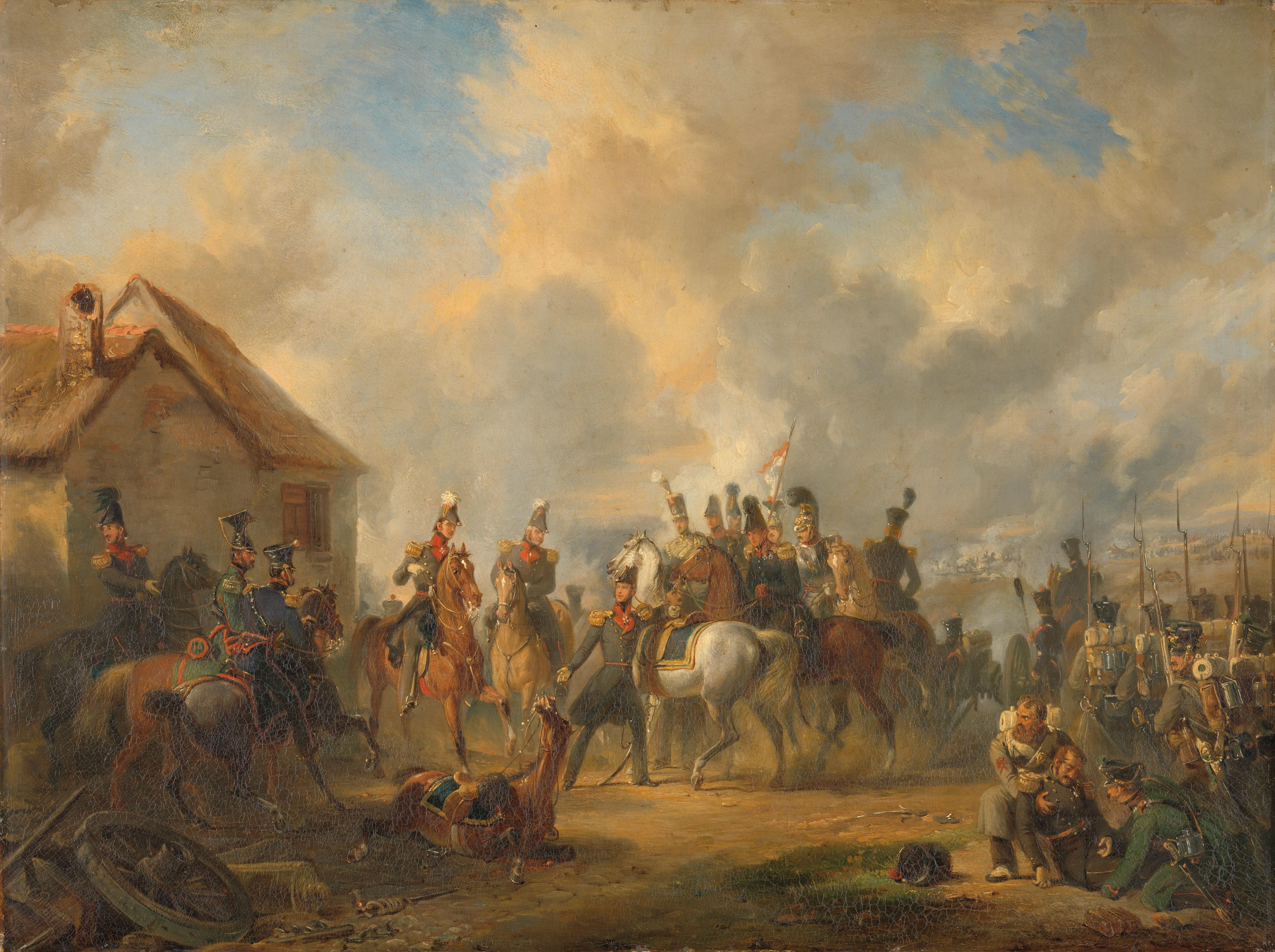
The Battle of Bautersem (1833)

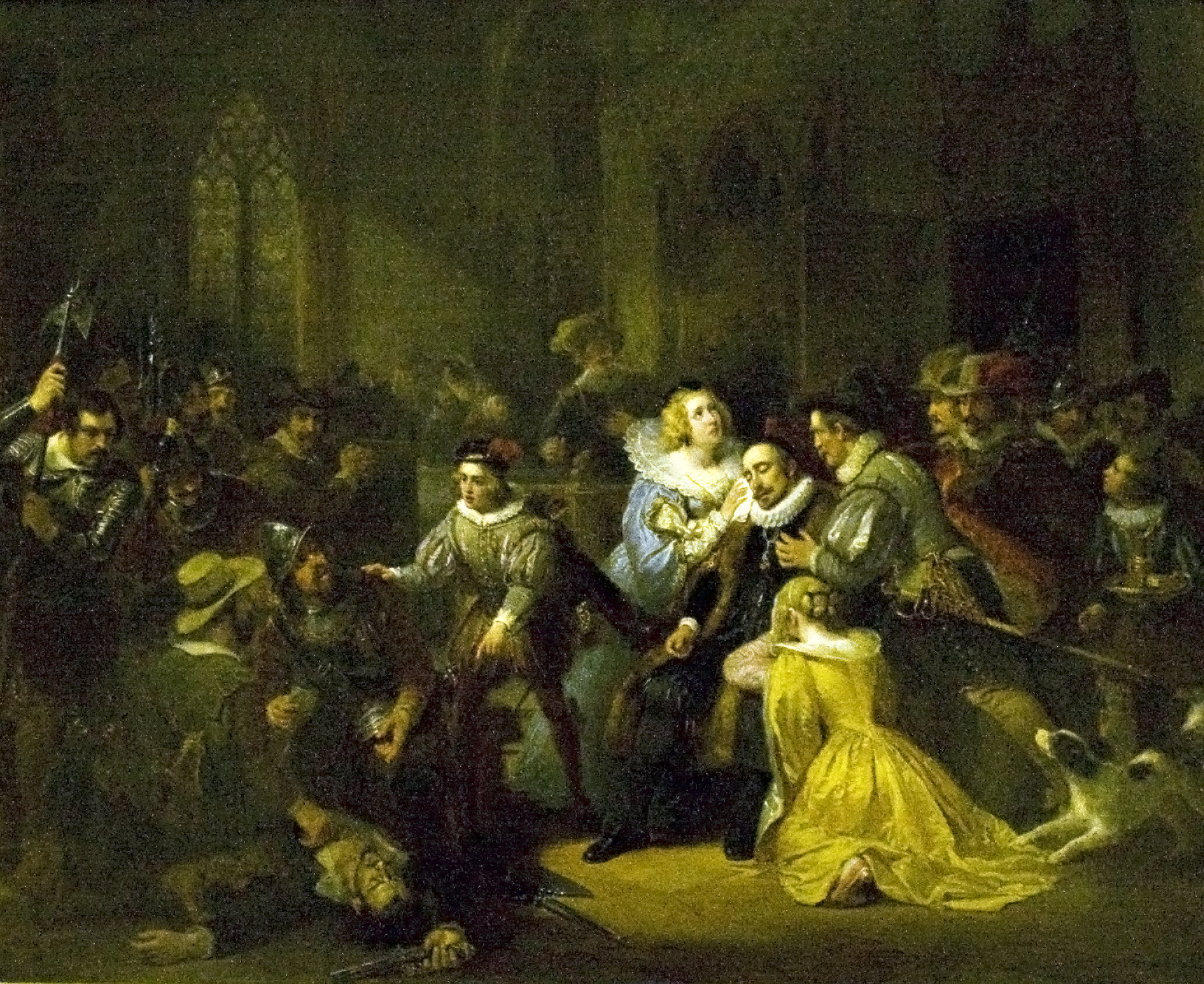
Murder attempt against William the Silent in 1582 (1838)

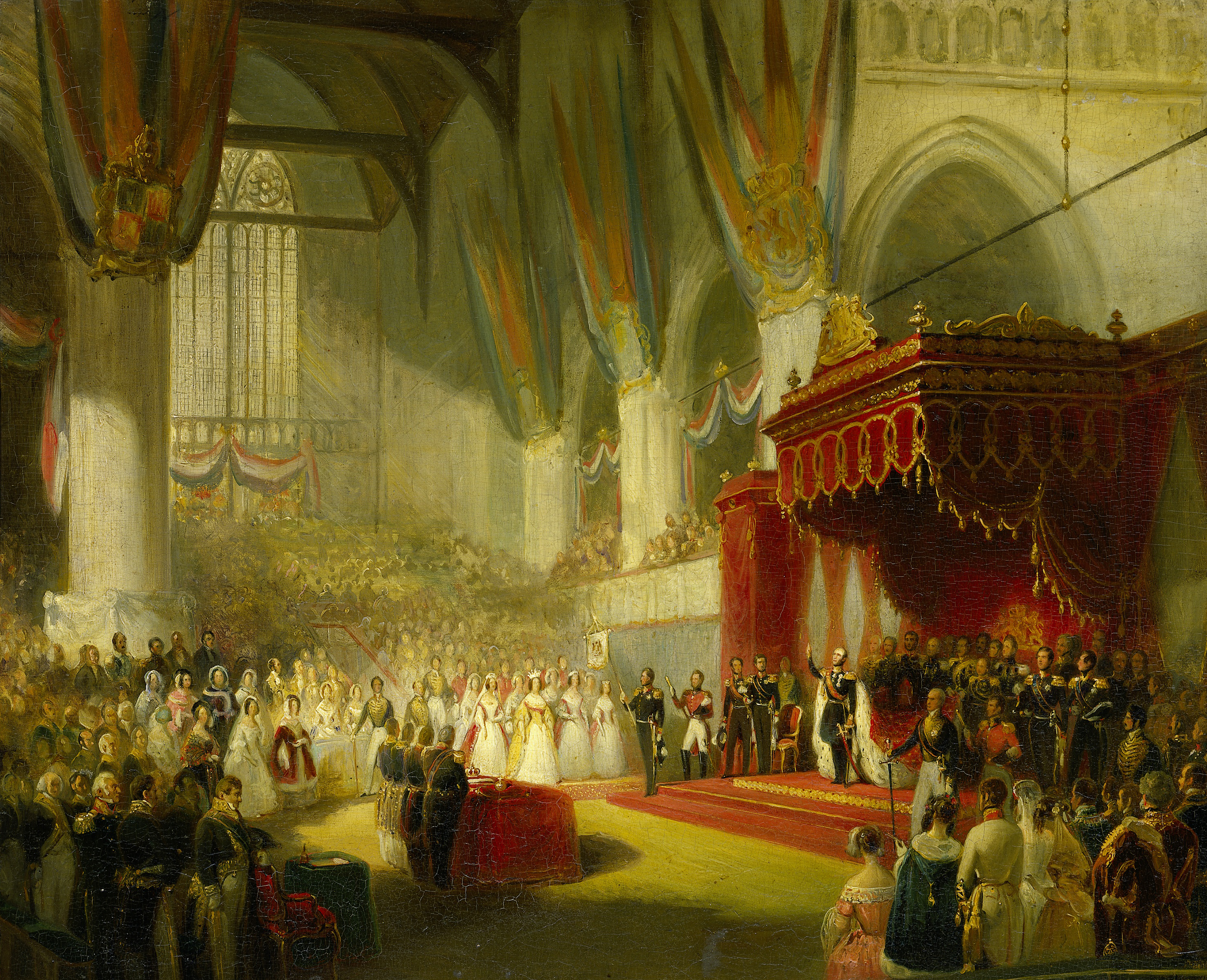
The Inauguration of King William II in the Nieuwe Kerk in Amsterdam on 28 November 1840 (1840–1845)

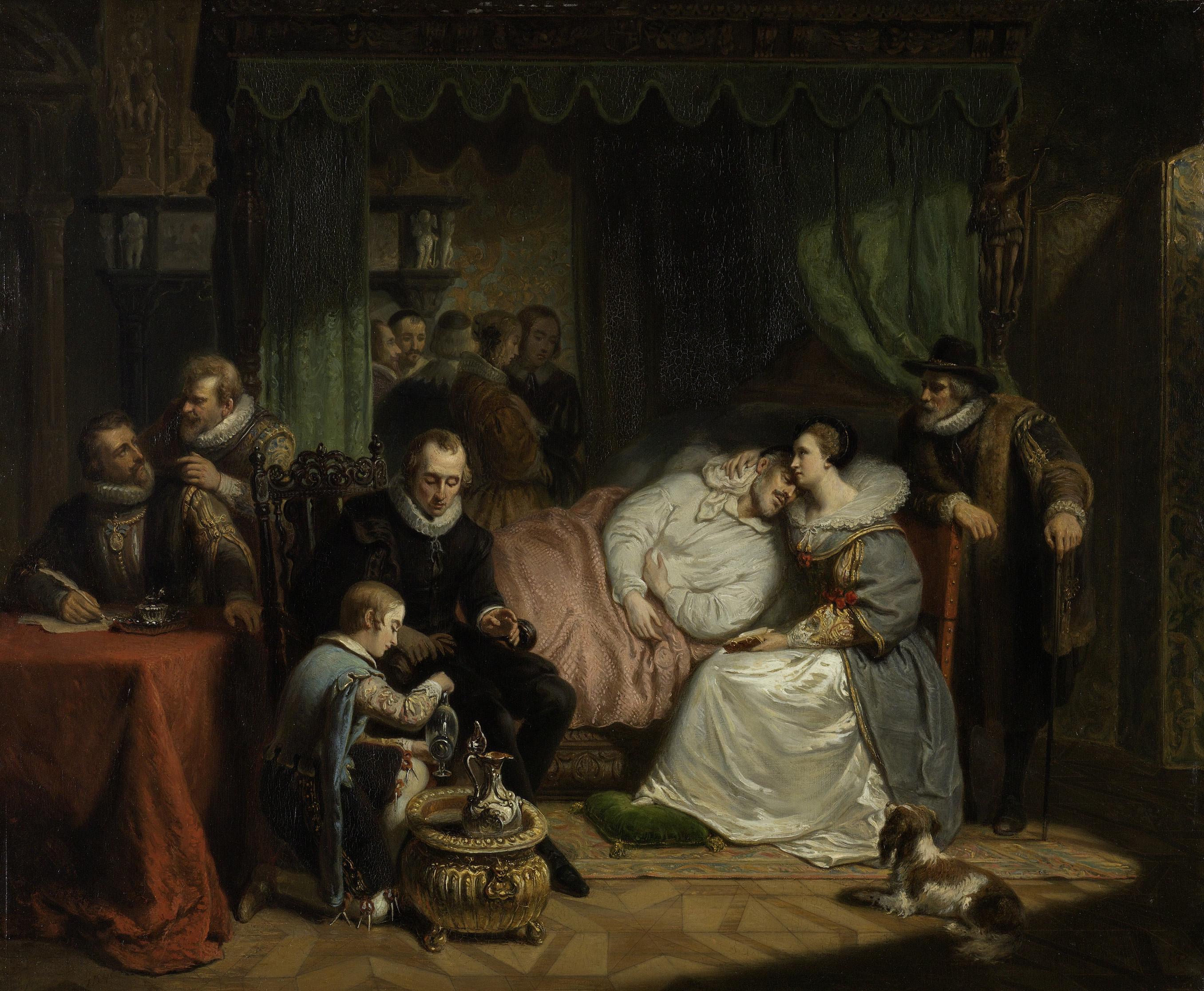
Prince William I nursed by his Wife Charlotte de Bourbon after the Abortive Attempt on his Life by Jean Jaurequi in Antwerp in 1582 (1840)

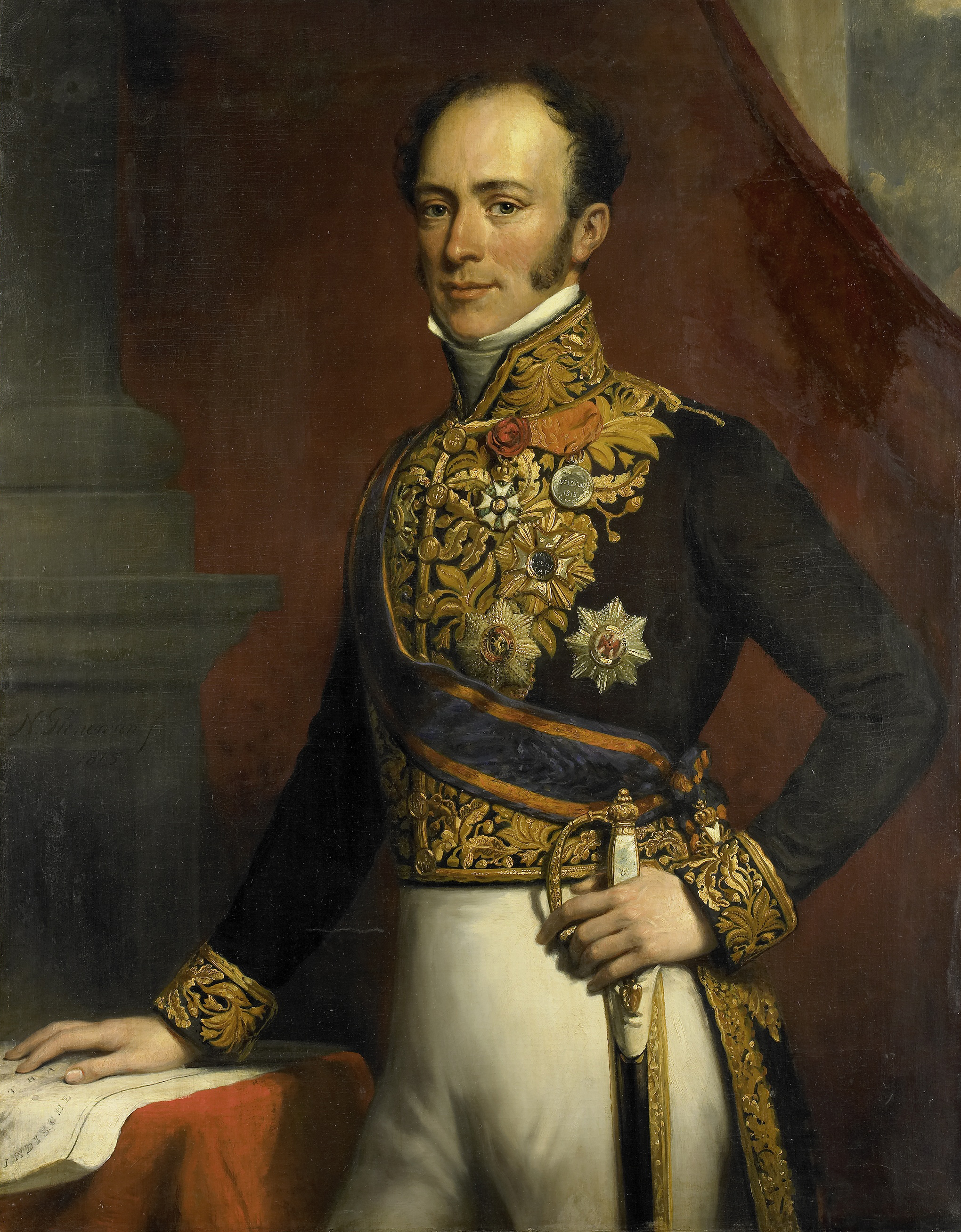
Portrait of Jan Jacob Rochussen, Governor-General of the Dutch East Indies (1845)

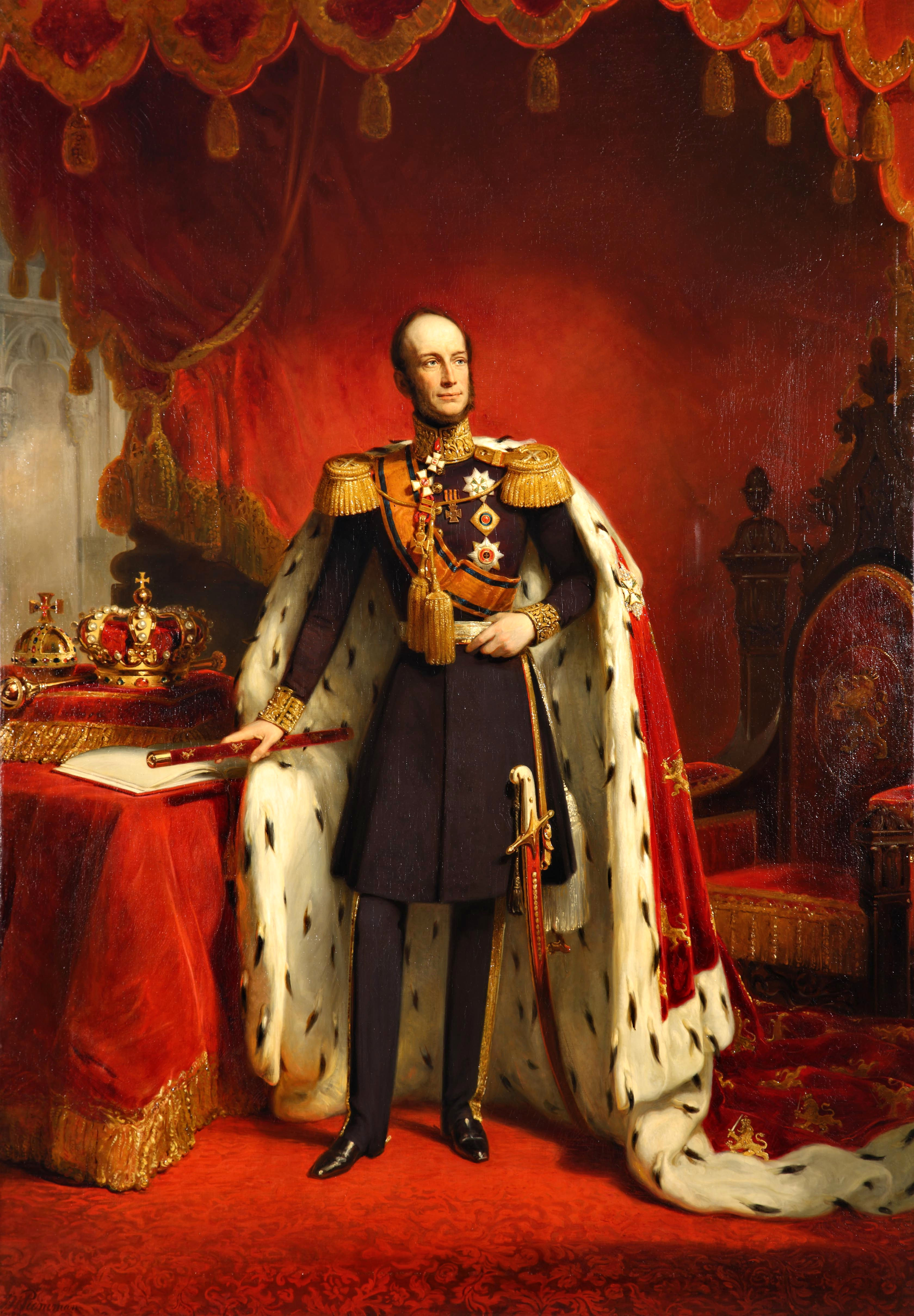
Portrait of William II of Orange, King of the Netherlands (1849)

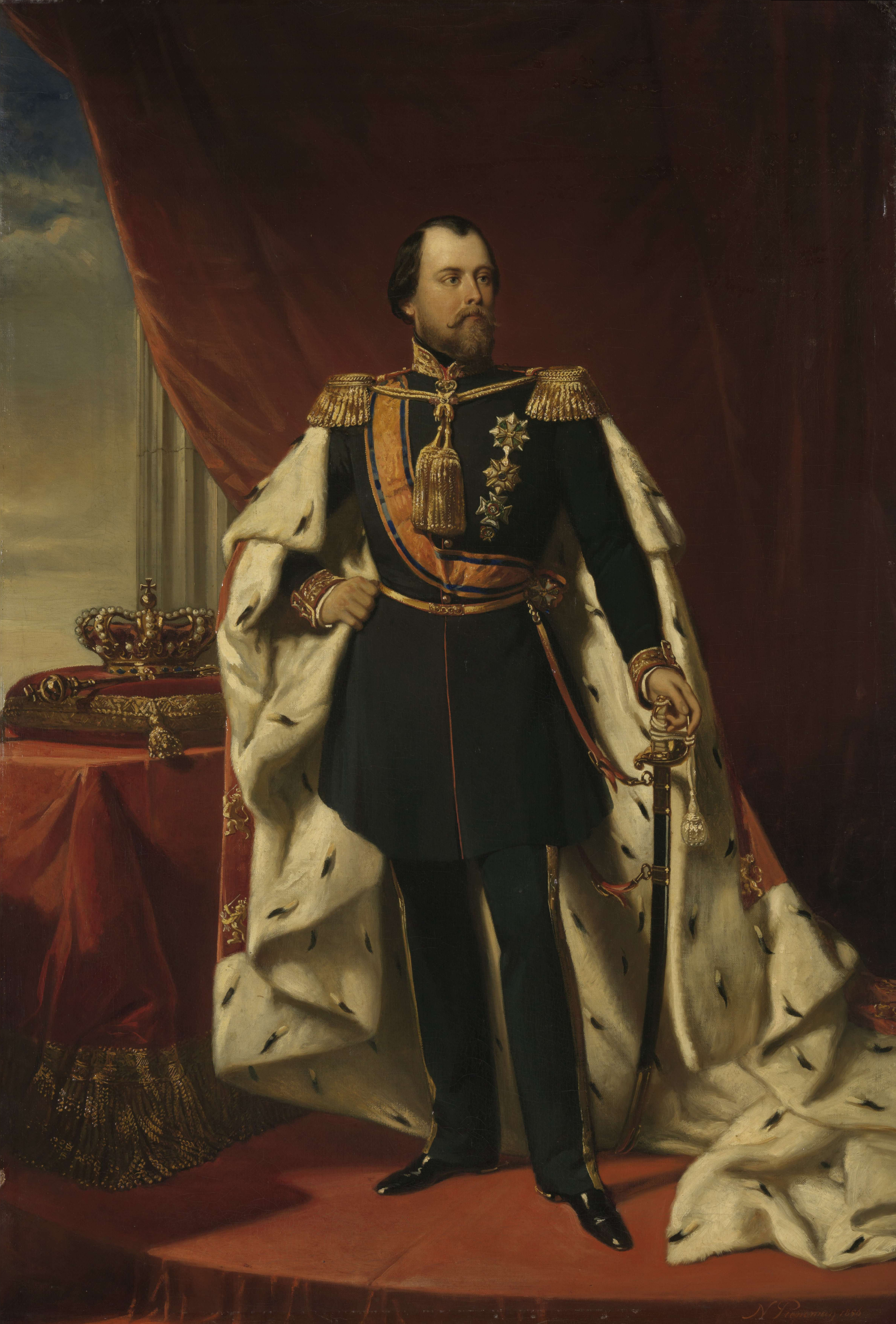
Portrait of William III, King of the Netherlands (1856)

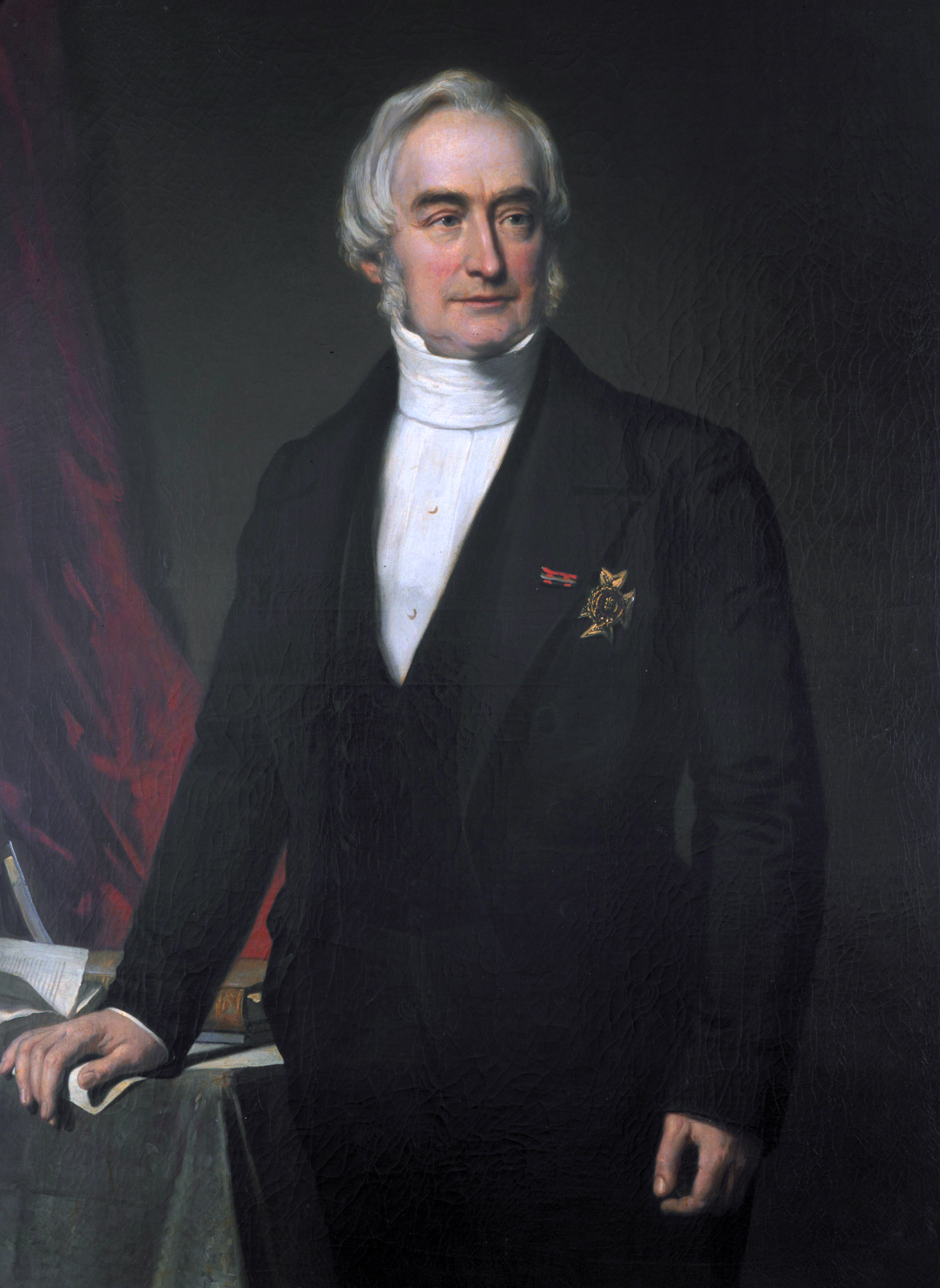
Portrait of Johannes Bosscha (1857)

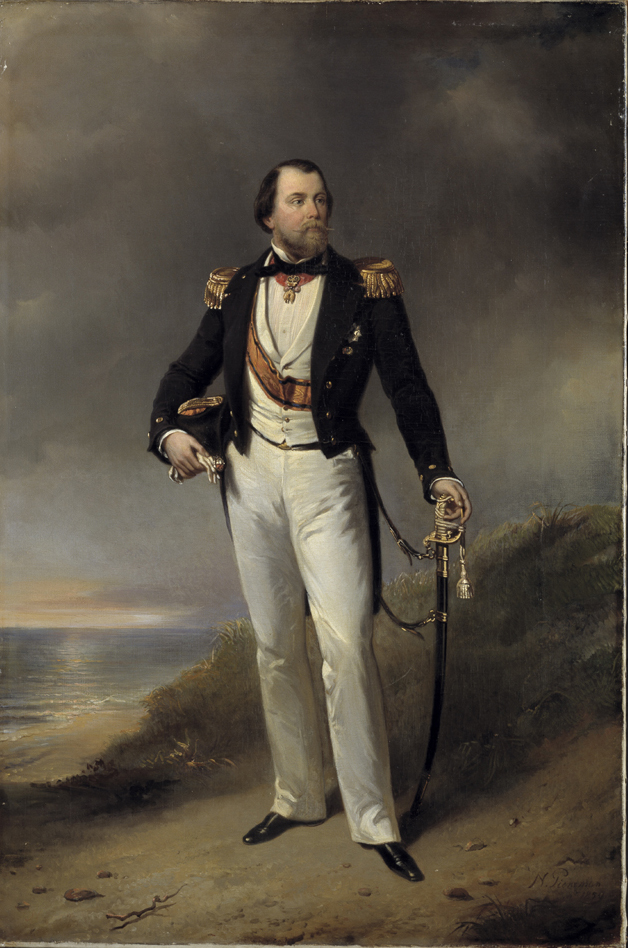
Portrait of King William III (1859)

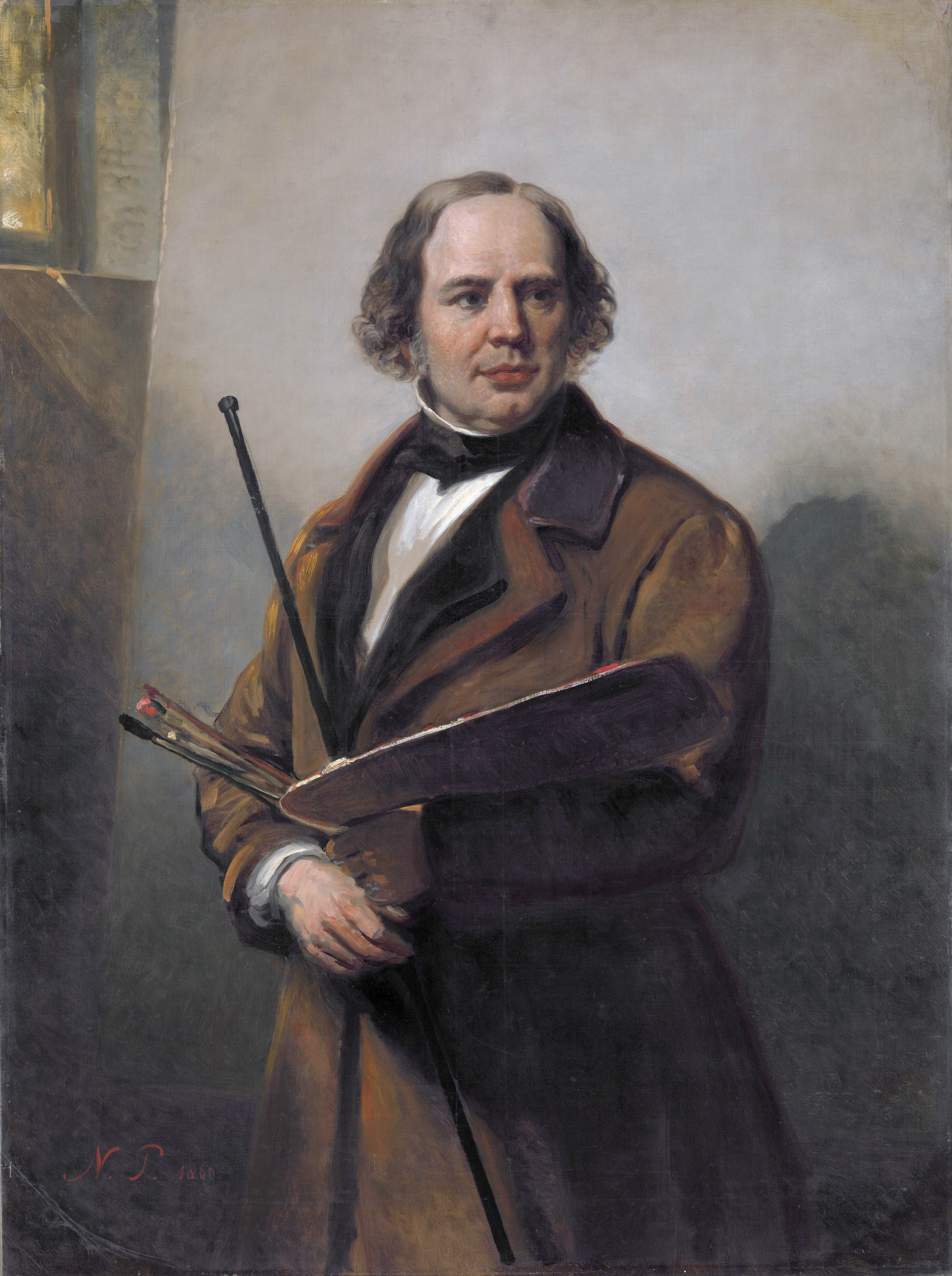
Portrait of Jan Willem Pieneman, Painter, Father of Nicolaas Pieneman (1860)
