= Henry Martin (murderer) =

- Died: 4 December 1866; Newbury, Berkshire
- Cause of death: Suicide by drowning
- Occupations: Petty criminal, unemployed

Henry Martin (died 1866 in Newbury, Berkshire) was a British murderer.

== Biography ==
Martin lived in Newbury, Berkshire. He spent most of his life living off petty crime, though was once employed as the assistant to a butcher. He was dismissed from this role after being convicted of fraud. He briefly lived in Woodspeen with a prostitute, Eliza Shaw, who provided him with sufficient money to avoid working. During the Michaelmas fair of September 1866, Martin was caught pickpocketing and was sentenced to a month's imprisonment at Reading Gaol.

During his incarceration, Martin learned of Shaw's growing relationship with a Newbury barman called James Brett. On 4 December, shortly after his release, Martin entered the Eagle public house at 124 Bartholomew Street. Brett and Shaw were in the building, and Martin began to argue with Brett. Violence broke out between Shaw and Martin, but soon ended as the entire pub was well aware of a number of police officers on the street outside. Martin, one of the last people to leave the pub, told a friend that he planned to murder both Shaw and Brett. He unsuccessfully attempted to have his friend provide him with a hammer or pickaxe, before heading to Shaw's cottage.

=== Murder and suicide ===
Martin arriving at Shaw's house armed with a butcher's cramp. He broke in through a window and went upstairs. Finding Brett and Shaw asleep in bed together, he slashed Brett's throat and repeatedly stabbed Shaw with the hook. Martin fled the house, leaving his victims dying in a pool of blood. Neighbours had heard shouting and a scuffle, but assumed it was normal based on Martin and Shaw's regular arguments.

At 9 am the following morning, the superintendent arrived. Shaw had died during the initial attack, suffering from a fractured skull and a penetration above her eye into her brain measuring 4 inches (10 cm). Brett was still alive, however, and received emergency medical treatment on his skull. His condition did not improve, and he died at approximately midday.

Martin had gone to the Crown Inn adjacent to the Kennet and Avon Canal. After finishing his drink, he walked to the footbridge to Northcroft. Removing his hat and boots, Martin tied his scarf around his ankles and jumped into the water. The superintendent, who had concluded that Martin was the sole perpetrator, followed witness accounts to the area and Martin's body was removed from the canal and taken to await the coroner in Enborne.

Martin was buried in Enborne on 6 December with no rites. Brett and Shaw's coffins were drawn in a cart to Speen where they were buried by Reverend H W Magendie.

== Sources ==
- Berkshire Record Office (1866), Catalogue of Coroners' Records, Newbury County Division, Kew: The National Archives
- Van Der Kiste, John (2010), Berkshire Murders, Stroud, Gloucestershire: The History Press, ISBN 978-0-7509-5129-6
