= Maria, Lady Eardley =

Painting by Thomas Gainsborough

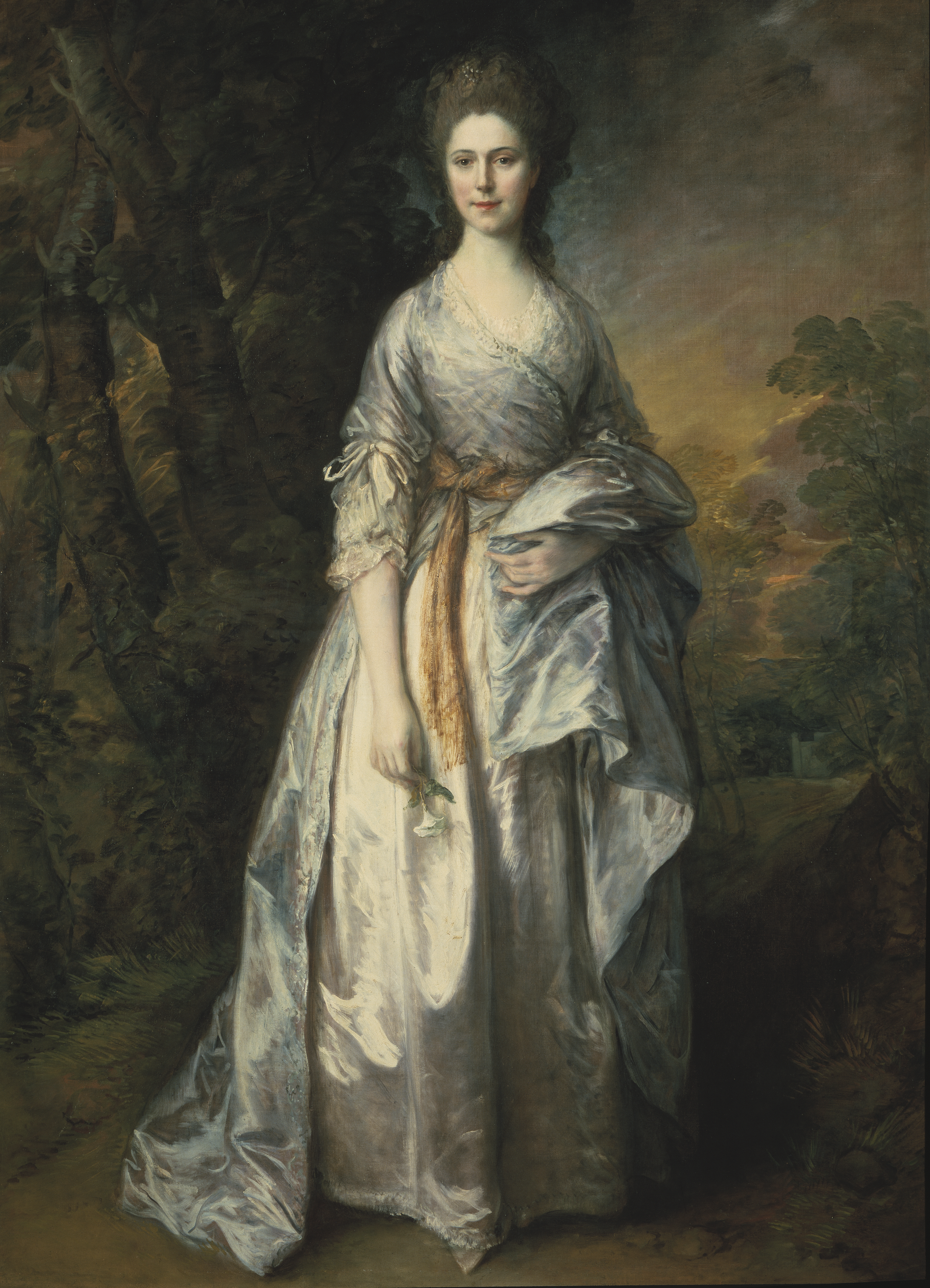
- Artist: Thomas Gainsborough
- Year: c. 1766-1767
- Medium: Oil on canvas
- Dimensions: 215 cm × 149 cm (85 in × 59 in)
- Location: Nationalmuseum; Stockholm

Maria, Lady Eardley is an oil on canvas by the English artist Thomas Gainsborough, from c. 1766-1767. It has been in the Nationalmuseum, in Stockholm, since 1966.

== History and description ==
It was painted around the time of Maria's marriage, in 1766, according to British art historian, Ellis Waterhouse.

The sitter is Maria Marow Gideon née Wilmot, later Lady Eardley (1743–1794), the daughter of judge John Eardley Wilmot and his wife Sarah Rivett. In December 1766 she married Sir Sampson Gideon, who became a member of Parliament soon after, and in 1789 was elevated to the Irish peerage to become Lord Eardley, with a name from her father's maternal family.

She was just over 23 years of age in the painting. She is facing the viewer, while wearing an elegant blue and white wrapping dress. She holds a flower in her hand and pearls glisten in her hair.

Gainsborough was a contemporary of Joshua Reynolds who painted the sitter before and after her marriage. Both specialized in portraits of the British aristocracy. This work is highly representative of Gainsborough's depictions of the British élite – they emerge in full figure from wooded landscapes. Grandeur was key, in content and form, and the portraits were usually full-length. He was also an accomplished landscape painter, and here the young woman is framed by the backdrop of a romantically leafy landscape garden. Gainsborough was a master at rendering aristocratic extravagance in a natural setting.
