= Joshua Reynolds =

English painter (1723–1792)

Sir Joshua Reynolds PRA FRS FRSA
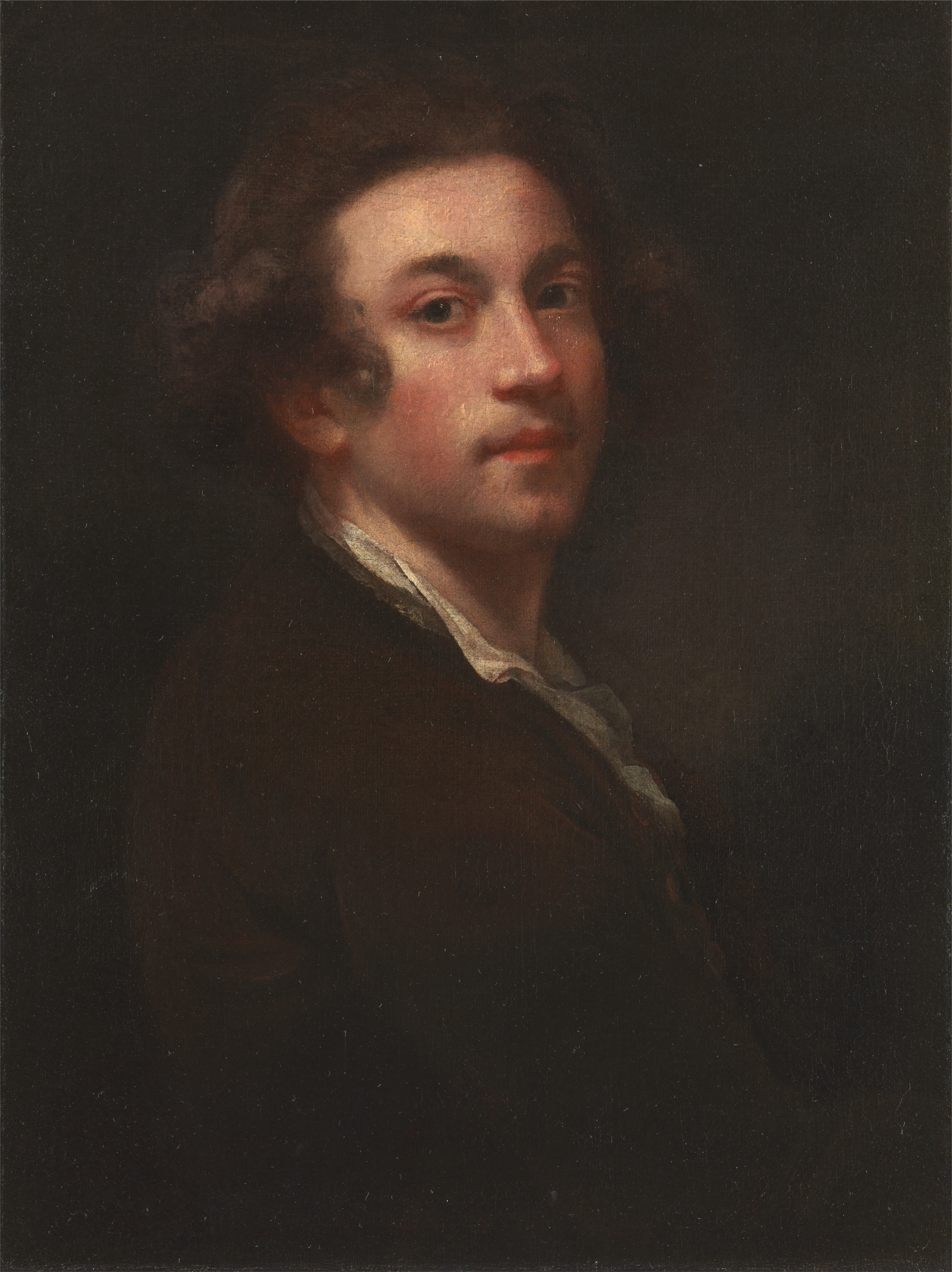
- Self-portrait, c. 1750
- Born: 16 July 1723; Plympton, Devon, England
- Died: 23 February 1792 (aged 68); Leicester Fields, London, England
- Resting place: St Paul's Cathedral
- Notable work: The Age of Innocence

Signature
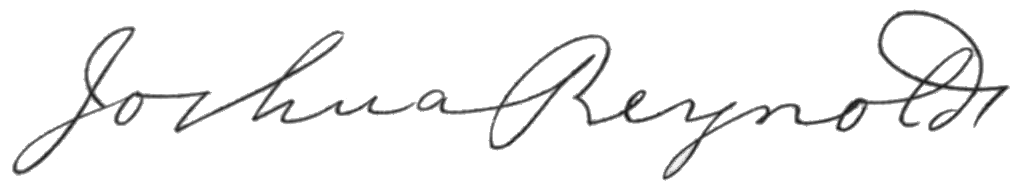

Sir Joshua Reynolds (16 July 1723 – 23 February 1792) was an English painter who specialised in portraits. The art critic John Russell called him one of the major European painters of the 18th century, while Lucy Peltz says he was "the leading portrait artist of the 18th-century and arguably one of the greatest artists in the history of art." He promoted the "Grand Style" in painting, which depended on idealisation of the imperfect. He was a founder and first president of the Royal Academy of Arts and was knighted by George III in 1769. He has been referred to as the "master who revolutionised British Art."

Reynolds had a famously prolific studio that produced over 2,000 paintings during his lifetime. Ellis Waterhouse estimated those works the painter did "think worthy" at "hardly less than a hundred paintings which one would like to take into consideration, either for their success, their originality, or their influence." Of these, Portrait of Omai is probably his best known work and has been described by Simon Schama as "one of the greatest things British art has ever produced [and] one of the all time, timeless masterpieces that painting can produce." Waterhouse considered The Marlborough Family as "the most monumental achievement of British portraiture" and that "Reynolds' genius came to full flower in the diversity and geniality he was able to give to his full-length portraits" like Portrait of Philip Gell and Portrait of the Earl of Carlisle.

Thomas Lawrence rated Sarah Siddons as the Tragic Muse as "indisputably the finest female portrait in the world." Neil Jeffares adds that Portrait of Robert Orme was "surely one of the great eighteenth-century European portraits." The price paid for the exceptional Portrait of Omai in 2023 was £50 million – far more than had ever been paid for an 18th-century picture. This was followed two years later by the sale of the iconic full-length Portrait of Lady Worsley for £25 million. Also in 2025, the full-length Portrait of Mrs. Lloyd was acquired by the National Trust for acceptance in lieu of tax of £17.5 million by H M Government (the way the scheme is structured meant the open market price calculation of the picture would be substantially higher than £17.5 million.) Jonathan Jones says "that puts Reynolds in the superstar category, way beyond his contemporaries, and competing with the likes of Damien Hirst and Lucian Freud." "Reynolds is not remote or staid at all. He's the portraitist of the Enlightenment, a daring artist who captured a daring age."

== Early life ==
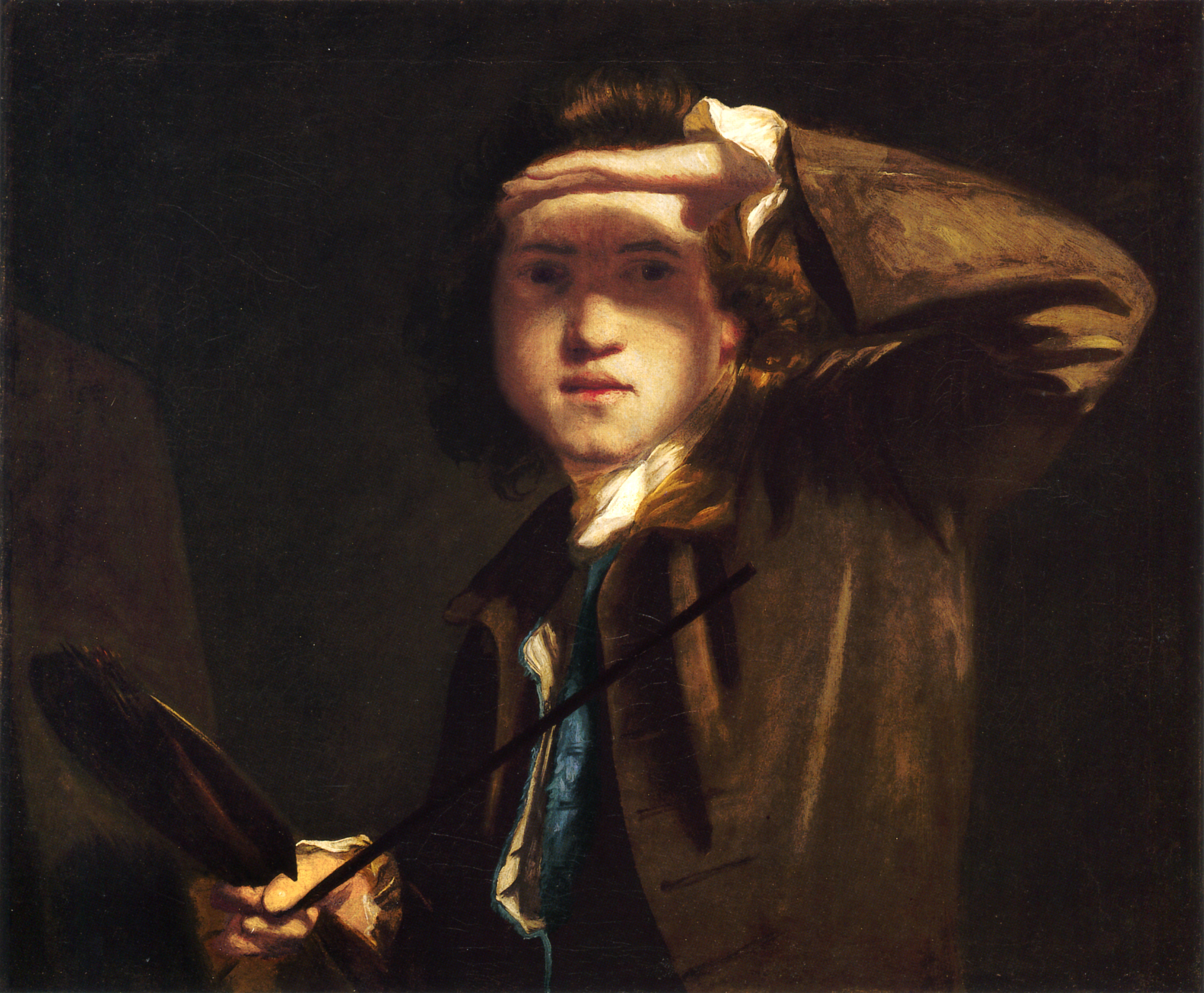
Self-portrait, aged about 24

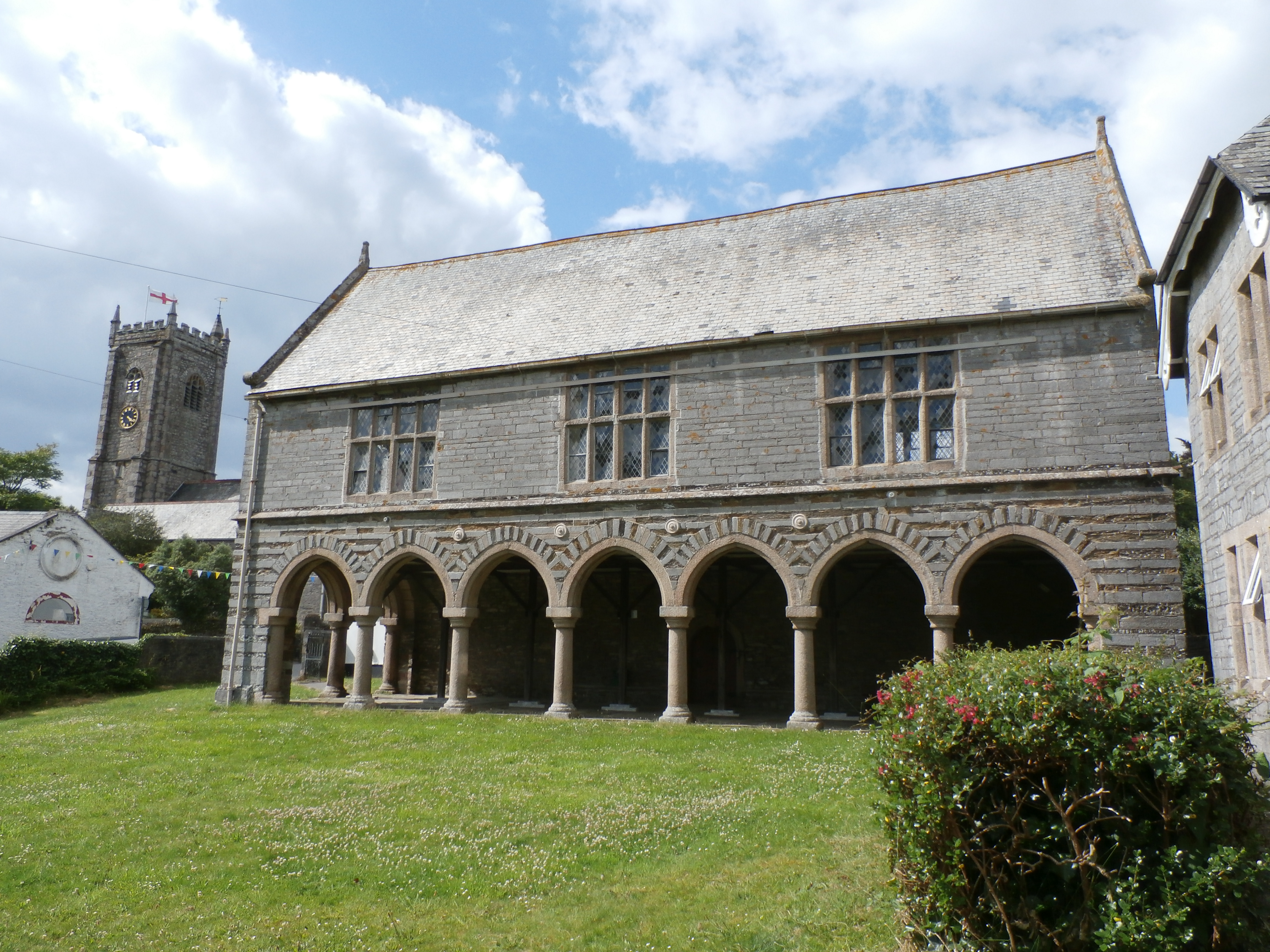
Old Grammar School, Plympton, founded 1658, built 1664, attended by Joshua Reynolds whose father was headmaster

Reynolds was born in Plympton, Devon, on 16 July 1723, as the third son of the Reverend Samuel Reynolds, master of the Plympton Free Grammar School in the town. His father had been a fellow of Balliol College, Oxford, but did not send any of his sons to the university. One of his sisters, seven years his senior, was Mary Palmer, author of Devonshire Dialogue, whose fondness for drawing is said to have had much influence on Joshua as a boy. In 1740, she provided £60, half of the premium paid to Thomas Hudson the portrait-painter, for Joshua's pupillage, and nine years later advanced money for his expenses in Italy. His other siblings included Frances Reynolds and Elizabeth Johnson.

As a boy, he also came under the influence of Zachariah Mudge, whose Platonistic philosophy stayed with him all his life. Reynolds made extracts in his commonplace book from Theophrastus, Plutarch, Seneca, Marcus Antonius, Ovid, William Shakespeare, John Milton, Alexander Pope, John Dryden, Joseph Addison, Richard Steele, and Aphra Behn and copied passages on art theory by Leonardo da Vinci, Charles Alphonse Du Fresnoy, and André Félibien. The work that came to have the most influence on Reynolds was Jonathan Richardson's An Essay on the Theory of Painting (1715). Reynolds' annotated copy was lost for nearly two hundred years until it appeared in a Cambridge bookshop, inscribed with the signature "J. Reynolds Pictor". It is now in the collection of the Royal Academy of Arts, London.

== Career ==
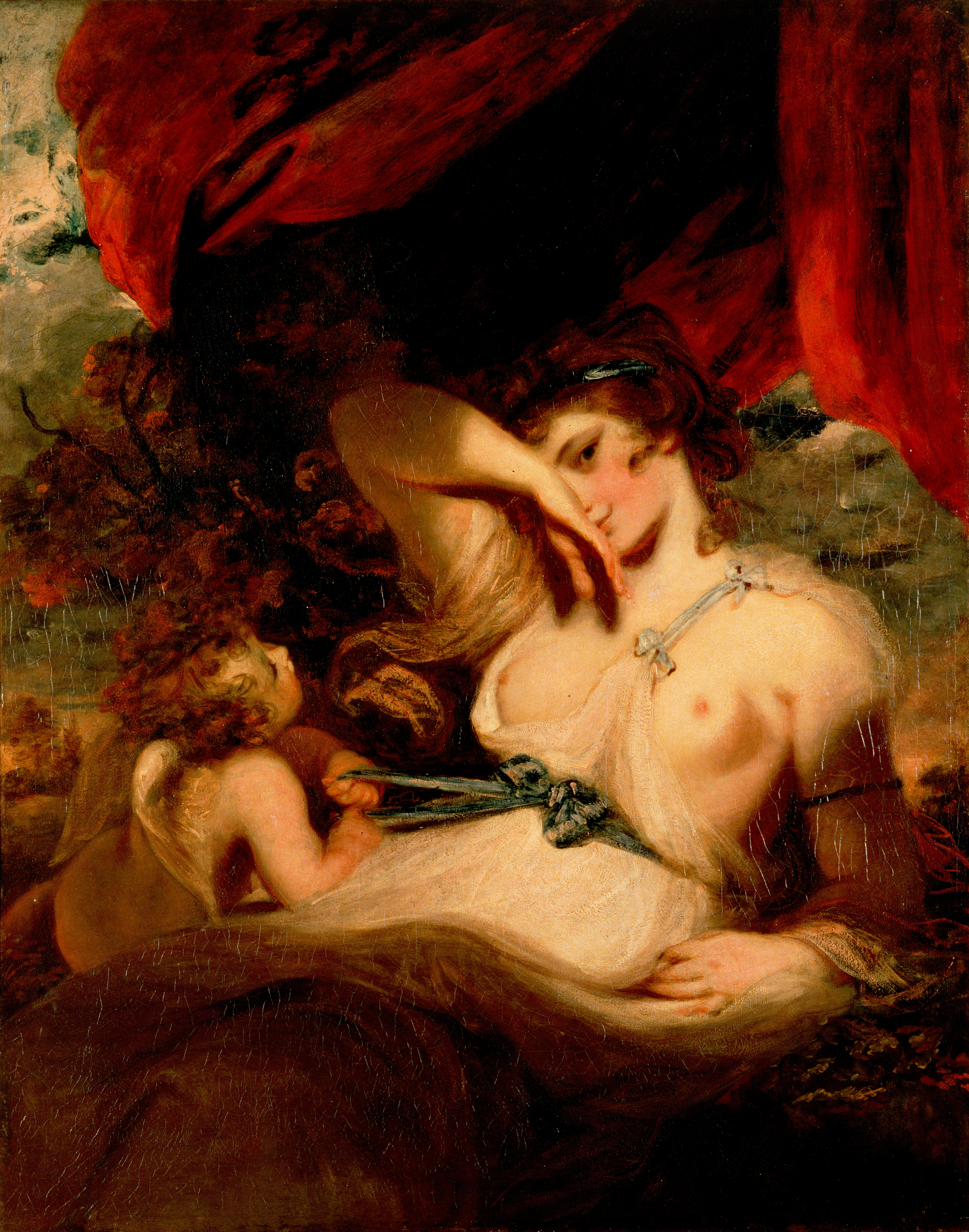
Cupid Untying the Zone of Venus (1788)

Having shown an early interest in art, Reynolds was apprenticed in 1740 to the fashionable London portrait painter Thomas Hudson, who like Reynolds had been born in Devon. Hudson had a collection of Old Master drawings, including some by Guercino, of which Reynolds made copies. Although apprenticed to Hudson for a period of four years, Reynolds remained with him only until the summer of 1743. Having left Hudson, Reynolds worked for some time as a portrait-painter in Plymouth Dock (now Devonport). He returned to London before the end of 1744, but following his father's death in late 1745 he shared a house in Plymouth Dock with his sisters.

In 1749, Reynolds met Commodore Augustus Keppel, who invited him to join HMS Centurion, of which he had command, on a voyage to the Mediterranean. While with the ship he visited Lisbon, Cádiz, Algiers and Minorca. From Minorca he travelled to Livorno in Italy, and then to Rome, where he spent two years, studying the Old Masters and acquiring a taste for the "Grand Style". Lord Edgcumbe, who had known Reynolds as a boy and introduced him to Keppel, suggested he should study with Pompeo Batoni, the leading painter in Rome, but Reynolds replied that he had nothing to learn from him. While in Rome he suffered a severe cold, which left him partially deaf, and, as a result, he began to carry the small ear trumpet with which he is often pictured.

Reynolds travelled homeward overland via Florence, Bologna, Venice, and Paris. He was accompanied by Giuseppe Marchi, then aged about 17. Apart from a brief interlude in 1770, Marchi remained in Reynolds' employment as a studio assistant for the rest of the artist's career. Following his arrival in England in October 1752, Reynolds spent three months in Devon before establishing himself in London the following year and remaining there for the rest of his life. He took rooms in St Martin's Lane, before moving to Great Newport Street; his sister Frances acted as his housekeeper. He achieved success rapidly, and was extremely prolific. Lord Edgecumbe recommended William Cavendish, 3rd Duke of Devonshire and Charles FitzRoy, 2nd Duke of Grafton to sit for him, and other peers followed, including Prince William, Duke of Cumberland, third son of George II, in whose portrait, according to Nicholas Penny "bulk is brilliantly converted into power". In 1760, Reynolds moved into a large house, with space to show his works and accommodate his assistants, on the west side of Leicester Fields (now Leicester Square).

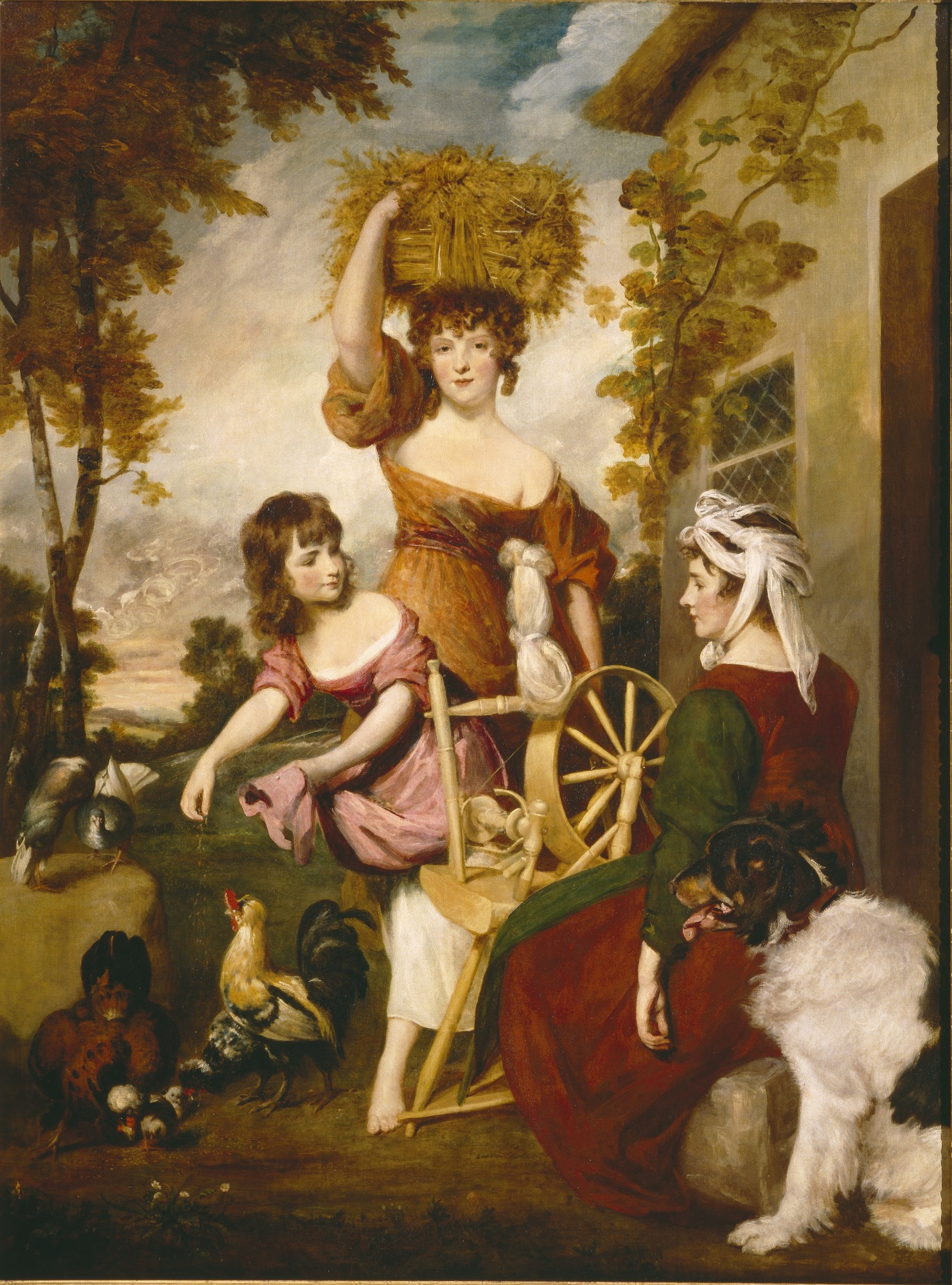
The Cottagers (1788)

Alongside ambitious full-length portraits, Reynolds painted large numbers of smaller works. In the late 1750s, at the height of the social season, he received five or six sitters a day, each for an hour. By 1761, Reynolds could command a fee of 80 guineas for a full-length portrait; in 1764, he was paid 100 guineas for a portrait of Lord Burghersh.

The clothing of Reynolds' sitters was usually painted by either one of his pupils, his studio assistant Giuseppe Marchi, or the specialist drapery painter Peter Toms. James Northcote, his pupil, wrote of this arrangement that "the imitation of particular stuffs is not the work of genius, but is to be acquired easily by practice, and this was what his pupils could do by care and time more than he himself chose to bestow; but his own slight and masterly work was still the best." Lay figures were used to model the clothes.

Reynolds often adapted the poses of his subjects from the works of earlier artists, a practice mocked by Nathaniel Hone in a painting called The Conjuror submitted to the Royal Academy exhibition of 1775, and now in the collection of the National Gallery of Ireland. It shows a figure representing, though not resembling, Reynolds, seated in front of a cascade of prints from which Reynolds had borrowed with varying degrees of subtlety.

Although not known principally for his landscapes, Reynolds did paint in this genre. He had an excellent vantage from his house, Wick House, on Richmond Hill, and painted the view in about 1780.

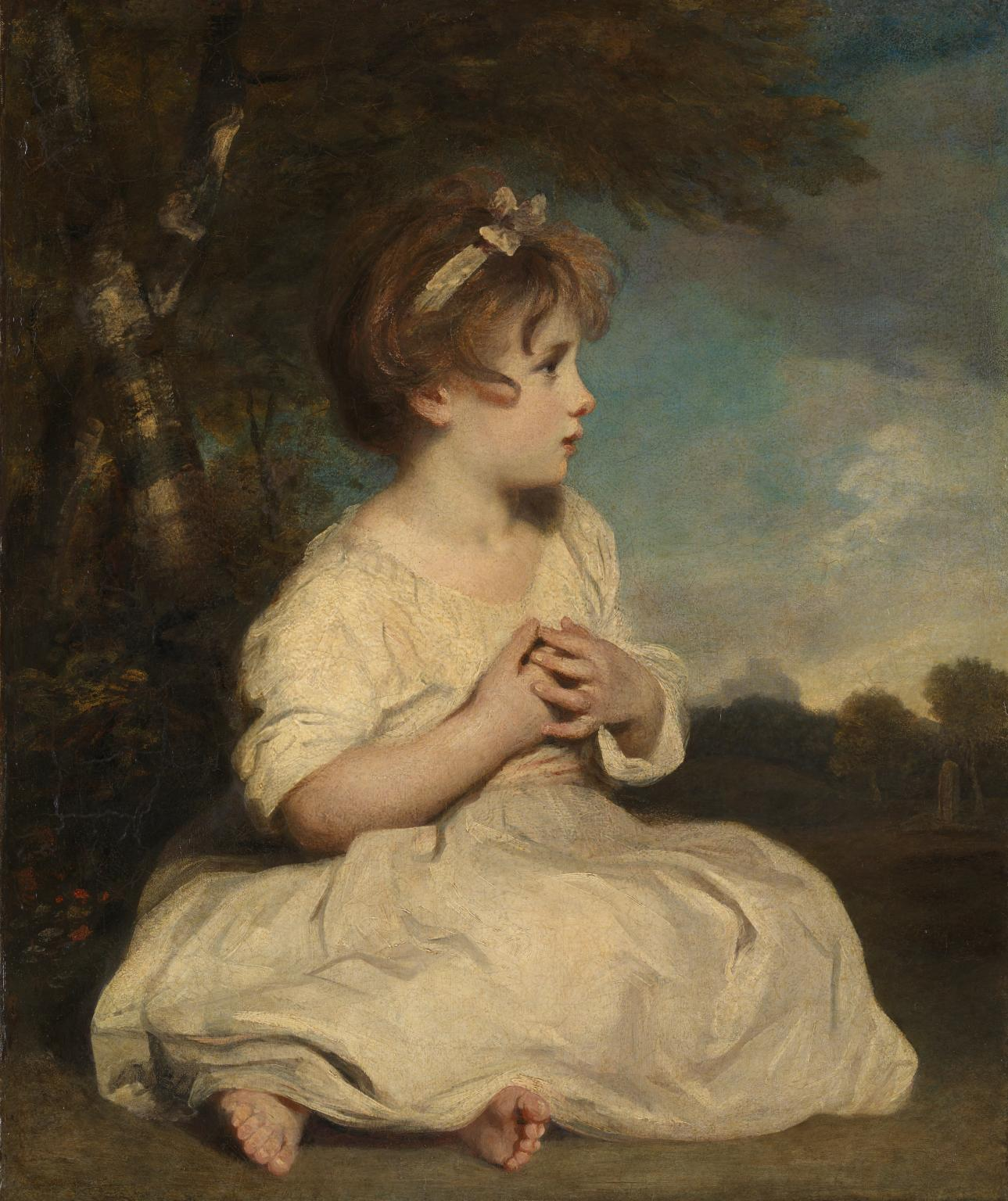
The Age of Innocence (c. 1788). Reynolds emphasized the natural grace of children in his paintings.

Reynolds also was recognised for his portraits of children. He emphasised the innocence and natural grace of children when depicting them. His 1788 portrait, Age of Innocence, is his best known character study of a child. The subject of the painting is not known, although suggestions include Theophila Gwatkin, his great-niece, and Lady Anne Spencer, the youngest daughter of George Spencer, 4th Duke of Marlborough.

=== The Club ===
Reynolds worked long hours in his studio, rarely taking a holiday. He was gregarious and keenly intellectual, with many friends from London's intelligentsia, numbered among whom were Samuel Johnson, Oliver Goldsmith, Edmund Burke, Giuseppe Baretti, Henry Thrale, David Garrick, and artist Angelica Kauffman, exchanging his portrait of her for a portrait of him by Kauffman. Johnson said in 1778: "Reynolds is too much under [Charles James] Fox and Burke at present. He is under the Fox star and the Irish constellation (meaning Burke). He is always under some planet".

Because of his popularity as a portrait painter, Reynolds enjoyed constant interaction with the wealthy and famous men and women of the day, and it was he who brought together the figures of "The Club". It was founded in 1764 and met in a suite of rooms on the first floor of the Turks Head at 9 Gerrard Street, now marked by a plaque. Original members included Burke, Bennet Langton, Topham Beauclerk, Goldsmith, Anthony Chamier, Thomas Hawkins, and Christopher Nugent, to be joined by Garrick, Boswell, and Richard Brinsley Sheridan. In ten years the membership had risen to 35. The Club met every Monday evening for supper and conversation and continued into the early hours of Tuesday morning. In later years, it met fortnightly during Parliamentary sessions. When in 1783 the landlord of the Turks Head died and the property was sold, The Club moved to Sackville Street.

=== Royal Academy ===
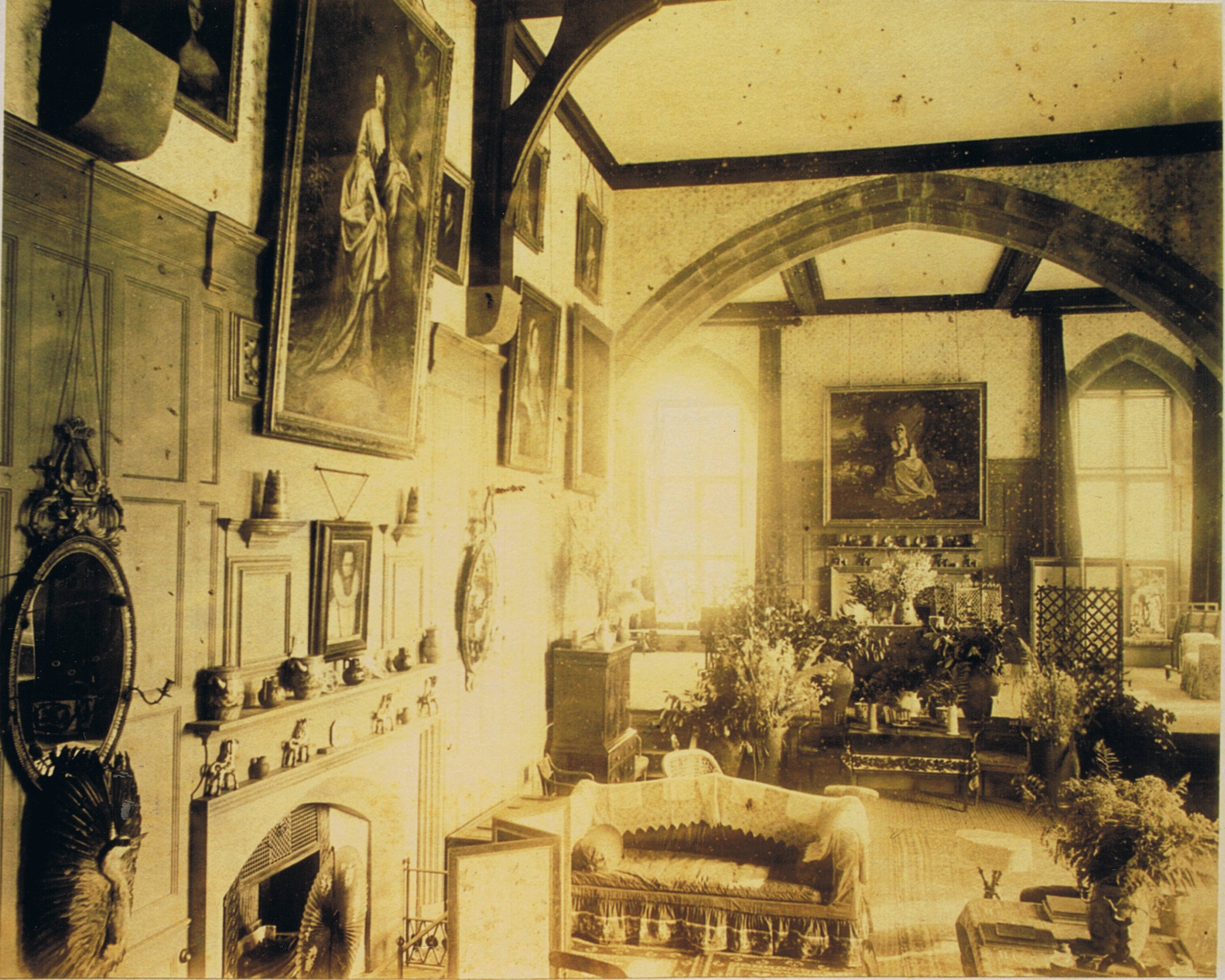
The hall at Loton Park, c. 1870. Showing, in situ, on the far wall Reynolds' Frances Anne Crewe (Miss Greville), as St. Genevieve (c. 1773)

Reynolds was one of the earliest members of the Royal Society of Arts, helped found the Society of Artists of Great Britain, and in 1768 became the first president of the Royal Academy of Arts, a position he was to hold until his death. In 1769, he was knighted by George III, only the second English artist to be so honoured. His Discourses, a series of lectures delivered at the academy between 1769 and 1790, are remembered for their sensitivity and perception. In one lecture, he expressed the opinion that "invention, strictly speaking, is little more than a new combination of those images which have been previously gathered and deposited in the memory." William Jackson in his contemporary essays said of Reynolds 'there is much ingenuity and originality in all his academic discourses, replete with classical knowledge of his art, acute remarks on the works of others, and general taste and discernment'.

Reynolds and the Royal Academy received a mixed reception. Critics included William Blake who published the vitriolic Annotations to Sir Joshua Reynolds' Discourses in 1808. J. M. W. Turner and Northcote were fervent acolytes: Turner requested he be laid to rest at Reynolds' side, and Northcote, who spent four years as Reynolds' pupil, wrote to his family: "I know him thoroughly, and all his faults, I am sure, and yet almost worship him." In 2018, the Royal Academy of Arts celebrated its 250th anniversary from its opening in 1768. This became an impetus for galleries and museums across the UK to celebrate "the making, debating and exhibiting art at the Royal Academy". Waddesdon Manor was amongst the historic houses that supported Sir Joshua Reynolds's influence at the academy, acknowledging how:

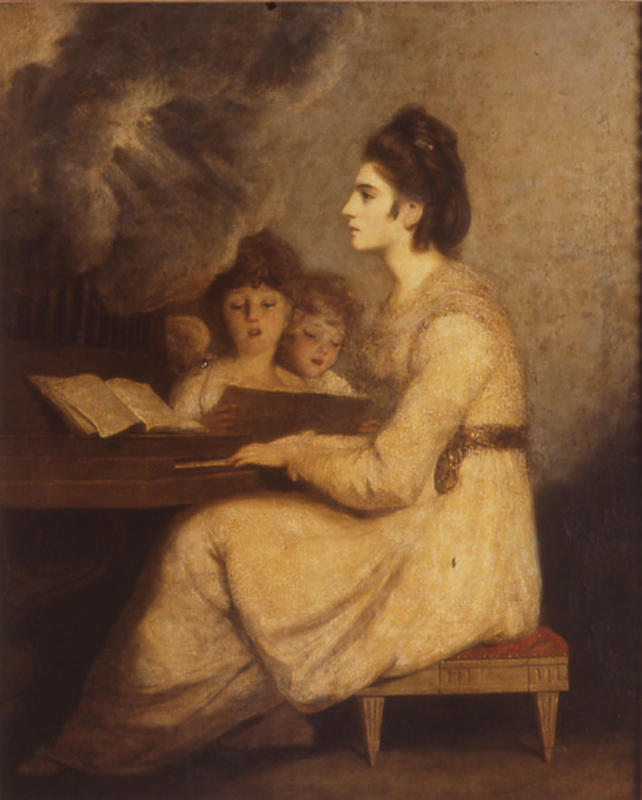
Reynolds's 'Mrs Sheridan in the character of St Cecilia' was considered by the artist's nephew as a 'sight worth coming to Devonshire to see, I cannot suppose that there was ever a greater Beauty in the world, nor even Helen or Cleopatra could have exceeded her', 1775, Waddesdon Manor.

[He] transformed British painting with portraits and subject pictures that engaged their audience's knowledge, imagination, memory and emotions... As an eloquent teacher and art theorist, he used his role at the head of the Royal Academy to raise the status of art and artists of Britain.

=== Lord Keppel ===
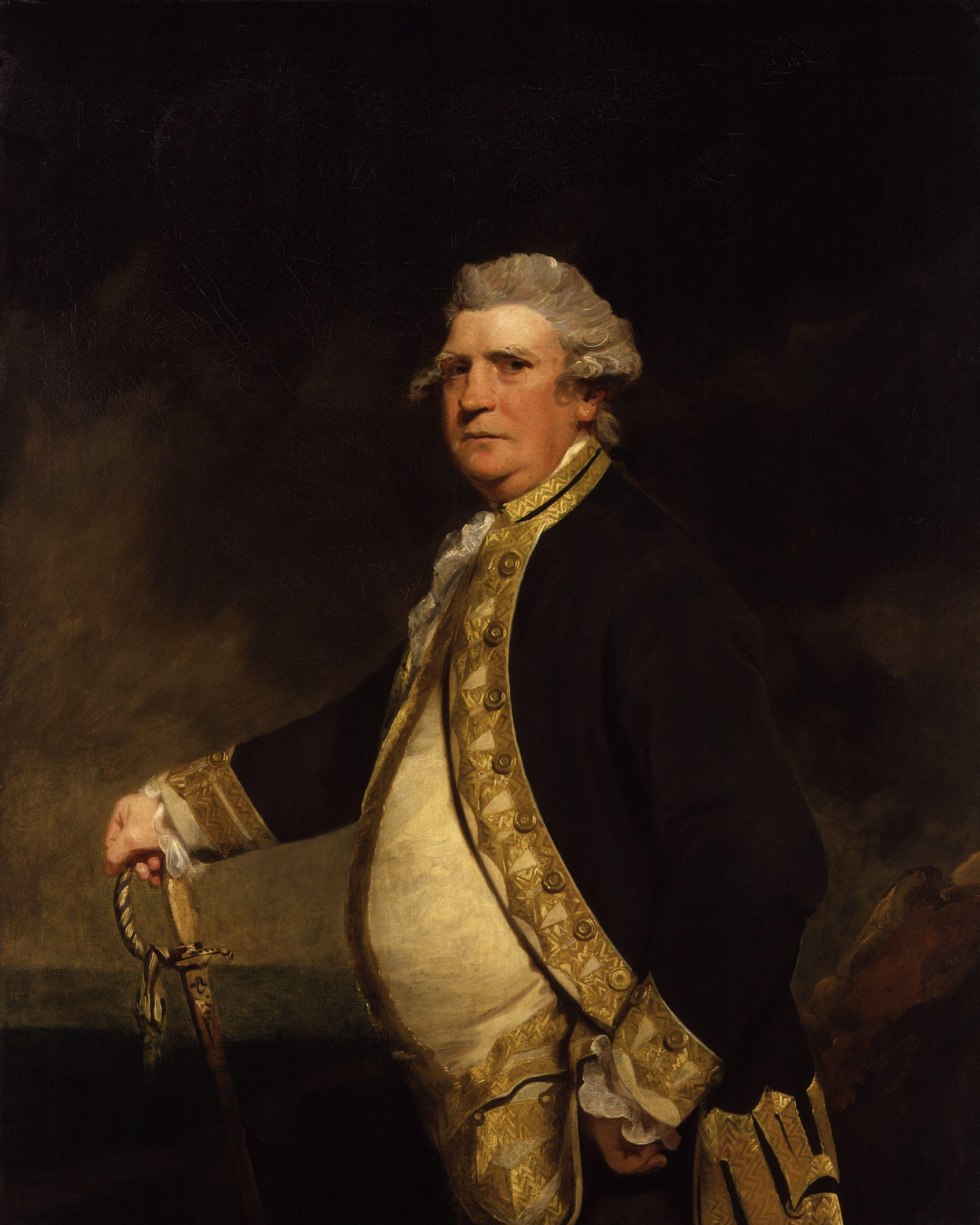
Lord Keppel (1779)

In the Battle of Ushant against the French in 1778, Augustus Keppel, 1st Viscount Keppel commanded the Channel Fleet and the outcome resulted in no clear winner; Keppel ordered the attack be renewed and was obeyed except by Sir Hugh Palliser, who commanded the rear, and the French escaped bombardment. A dispute between Keppel and Palliser arose and Palliser brought charges of misconduct and neglect of duty against Keppel and the Admiralty decided to court-martial him. On 11 February 1779, Keppel was acquitted of all charges and became a national hero. One of Keppel's lawyers commissioned Sir Nathaniel Dance-Holland to paint a portrait of Keppel, but Keppel redirected it to Reynolds. Reynolds alluded to Keppel's trial in the portrait by painting his hand on his sword, reflecting the presiding officer's words at the court-martial: "In delivering to you your sword, I am to congratulate you on its being restored to you with so much honour".

=== Principal Painter in Ordinary to the King ===
On 10 August 1784, Allan Ramsay died and the office of Principal Painter in Ordinary to King George III became vacant. Thomas Gainsborough felt that he had a good chance of securing it, but Reynolds felt he deserved it and threatened to resign the presidency of the Royal Academy if he did not receive it. Reynolds noted in his pocket book: "Sept. 1, 2½, to attend at the Lord Chancellor's Office to be sworn in painter to the King". It did not make Reynolds happy, however, as he wrote to Boswell: "If I had known what a shabby miserable place it is, I would not have asked for it; besides as things have turned out I think a certain person is not worth speaking to, nor speaking of", presumably meaning the King. Reynolds wrote to Jonathan Shipley, Bishop of St Asaph, a few weeks later: "Your Lordship congratulation on my succeeding Mr. Ramsay I take very kindly, but it is a most miserable office, it is reduced from two hundred to thirty-eight pounds per annum, the Kings Rat catcher I believe is a better place, and I am to be paid only a fourth part of what I have from other people, so that the Portraits of their Majesties are not likely to be better done now, than they used to be, I should be ruined if I was to paint them myself".

=== Lord Heathfield ===
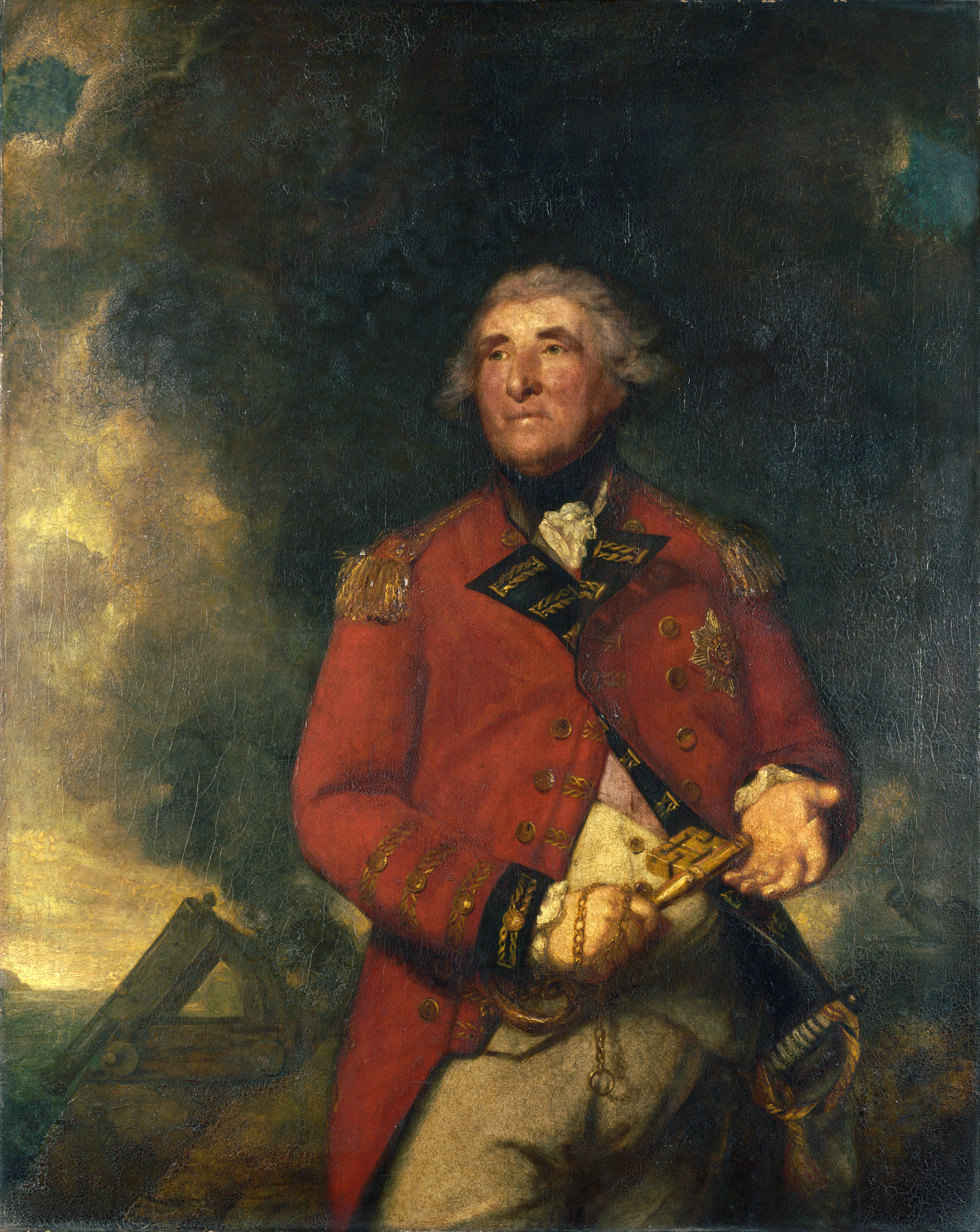
Portrait of Lord Heathfield (1787)

In 1787, Reynolds painted the portrait of George Augustus Eliott, 1st Baron Heathfield, who became a national hero for the successful defence of Gibraltar in the Great Siege from 1779 to 1783 against the combined forces of France and Spain. Heathfield is depicted against a background of clouds and cannon smoke, wearing the uniform of the 15th Light Dragoons and clasping the key of the Rock, its chain wrapped twice around his right hand. John Constable said in the 1830s that it was "almost a history of the defence of Gibraltar". Desmond Shawe-Taylor has claimed that the portrait may have a religious meaning, Heathfield holding the key similar to St. Peter (Jesus' "rock") possessing the keys to Heaven, Heathfield "the rock upon which Britannia builds her military interests".

== Later life ==
In 1789, Reynolds lost the sight of his left eye, which forced him into retirement. In 1791 James Boswell dedicated his Life of Samuel Johnson to Reynolds. Reynolds agreed with Burke's Reflections on the Revolution in France and, writing in early 1791, expressed his belief that the ancien régime of France had fallen due to spending too much time tending, as he puts it,

to the splendor of the foliage, to the neglect of the stirring the earth about the roots. They cultivated only those arts which could add splendor to the nation, to the neglect of those which supported it – They neglected Trade & substantial Manufacture ... but does it follow that a total revolution is necessary that because we have given ourselves up too much to the ornaments of life, we will now have none at all.

When attending a dinner at Holland House, Fox's niece Caroline was sat next to Reynolds and "burst out into glorification of the Revolution – and was grievously chilled and checked by her neighbour's cautious and unsympathetic tone".

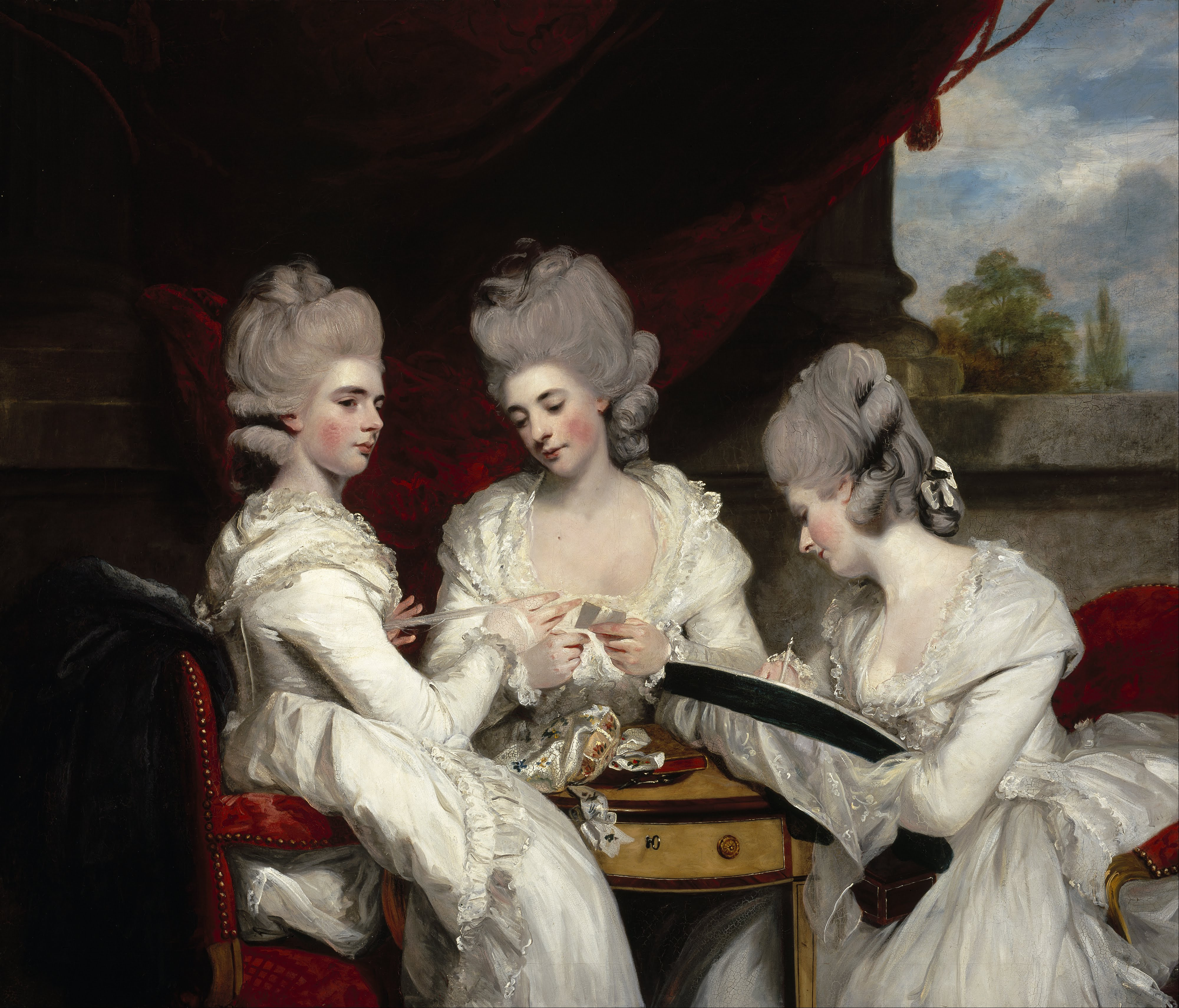
The Ladies Waldegrave (1780)

On 4 June 1791, at a dinner at the Freemasons' Tavern to mark the King's birthday, Reynolds drank to the toasts "GOD save the KING!" and "May our glorious Constitution under which the arts flourish, be immortal!", in what was reported by the Public Advertiser as "a fervour truly patriotick". Reynolds "filled the chair with a most convivial glee". He returned to town from Burke's house in Beaconsfield and Edmond Malone wrote that "we left his carriage at the Inn at Hayes, and walked five miles on the road, in a warm day, without his complaining of any fatigue".

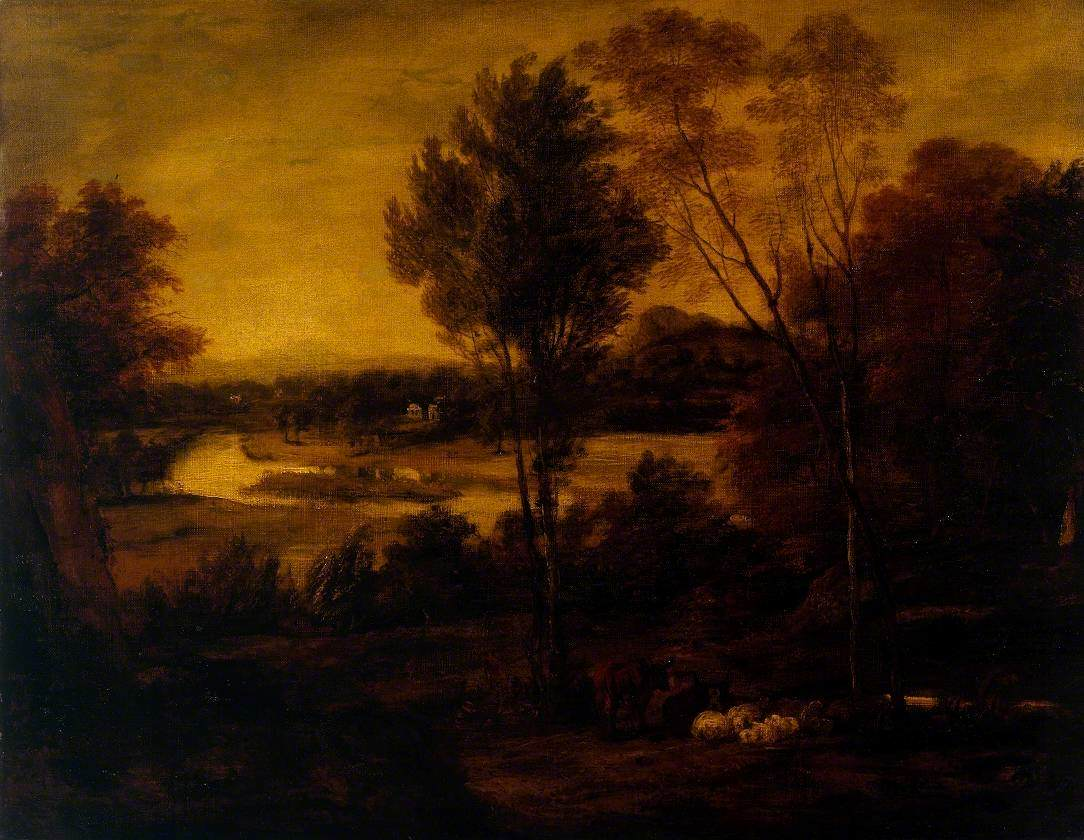
The Thames from Richmond Hill (1788)

Later that month Reynolds suffered from a swelling over his left eye and had to be purged by a surgeon. In October he was too ill to take the president's chair and in November, Frances Burney recorded that

I had long languished to see that kindly zealous friend, but his ill health had intimidated me from making the attempt": "He had a bandage over one eye, and the other shaded with a green half-bonnet. He seemed serious even to sadness, though extremely kind. 'I am very glad,' he said, in a meek voice and dejected accent, 'to see you again, and I wish I could see you better! but I have only one eye now, and hardly that.' I was really quite touched.

On 5 November, Reynolds, fearing he might not have an opportunity to write a will, wrote a memorandum intended to be his last will and testament, with Edmund Burke, Edmond Malone, and Philip Metcalfe named as executors. On 10 November, Reynolds wrote to Benjamin West to resign the presidency, but the General Assembly agreed he should be re-elected, with Sir William Chambers and West to deputise for him.

Doctors Richard Warren and Sir George Baker believed Reynolds' illness to be psychological and they bled his neck "with a view of drawing the humour from his eyes" but the effect, in the view of his niece, was that it seemed "as if the 'principle of life' were gone" from Reynolds. On New Year's Day 1792 Reynolds became "seized with sickness", and from that time onwards could not keep food down. Reynolds died on 23 February 1792 at his house at 47 Leicester Fields in London between eight and nine in the evening.

Burke was present on the night Reynolds died, and was moved within hours to write a eulogy of Reynolds, starting with the following sentiments: "Sir Joshua Reynolds was on very many accounts one of the most memorable men of his Time. He was the first Englishman who added the praise of the elegant Arts to the other Glories of his Country. In Taste, in grace, in facility, in happy invention, and in the richness and Harmony of colouring, he was equal to the great masters of the renowned Ages." Burke's tribute was well received and one journalist called it "the eulogium of Apelles pronounced by Pericles".

Reynolds was buried at St Paul's Cathedral. In 1903, a statue, by Alfred Drury, was erected in his honour in the Annenberg Courtyard of Burlington House, home of the Royal Academy. Around the statue are fountains and lights, installed in 2000, arranged in the pattern of a star chart at midnight on the night of Reynolds' birth. The planets are marked by granite discs, and the Moon by a water recess.

== Personal characteristics ==
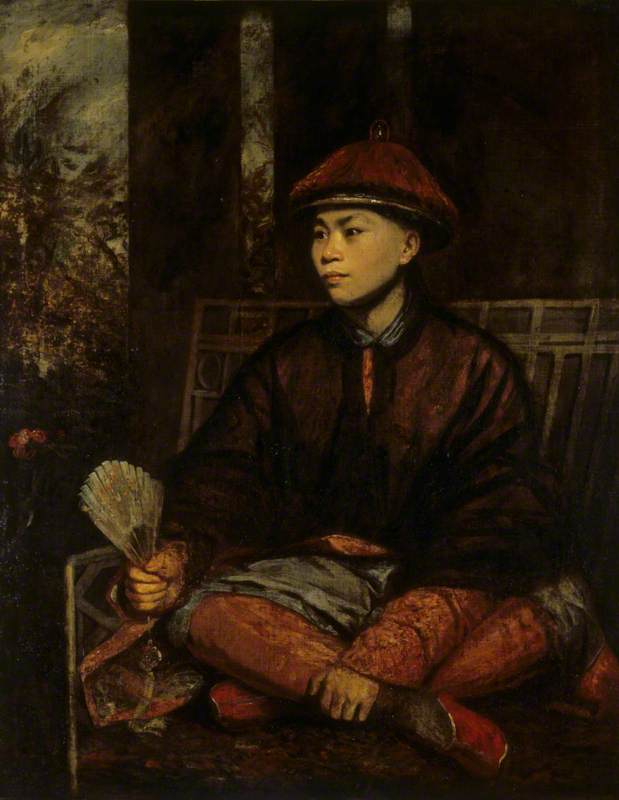
Huang Ya Dong 'Wang-Y-Tong' (1776)

In appearance Reynolds was not striking. Slightly built, he was about 5 ft 6 in (1.68 m) tall with dark brown curls, a florid complexion and features that James Boswell thought were "rather too largely and strongly limned." He had a broad face and a cleft chin, and the bridge of his nose was slightly dented; his skin was scarred by smallpox and his upper lip disfigured as a result of falling from a horse as a young man. Edmond Malone asserted however that "his appearance at first sight impressed the spectator with the idea of a well-born and well-bred English gentleman."

In his mature years he suffered from deafness, as recorded by Frances Burney, although this did not impede his lively social life. Renowned for his placidity, Reynolds often claimed that he "hated nobody". This may be self-idealisation. It is well known that he disliked George Romney, whom he referred to only as "the man in Cavendish Square" and whom he successfully prevented from becoming a member of the Royal Academy. He did not like Gainsborough, yet appreciated his achievements in the obituary he wrote of his rival. (Rump; Kidson). It is said that when he taught in one of his "discourses" that a painter should not amass too much of the colour blue in the foreground of an image, Gainsborough was prompted to paint his famous The Blue Boy.

Never quite losing his Devonshire accent, Reynolds was not only an amiable and original conversationalist, but a friendly and generous host, so that Frances Burney recorded in her diary that he had "a suavity of disposition that set everybody at their ease in his society", and William Makepeace Thackeray believed "of all the polite men of that age, Joshua Reynolds was the finest gentleman". Dr Johnson commented on the "inoffensiveness" of his nature; Edmund Burke noted his "strong turn for humor". Thomas Barnard, who later became Bishop of Killaloe, wrote in his closing verses on Reynolds stating:

Thou say'st not only skill is gained
But genius too may be attained
By studious imitation;
Thy temper mild, thy genius fine
I'll copy till I make them mine
By constant application.

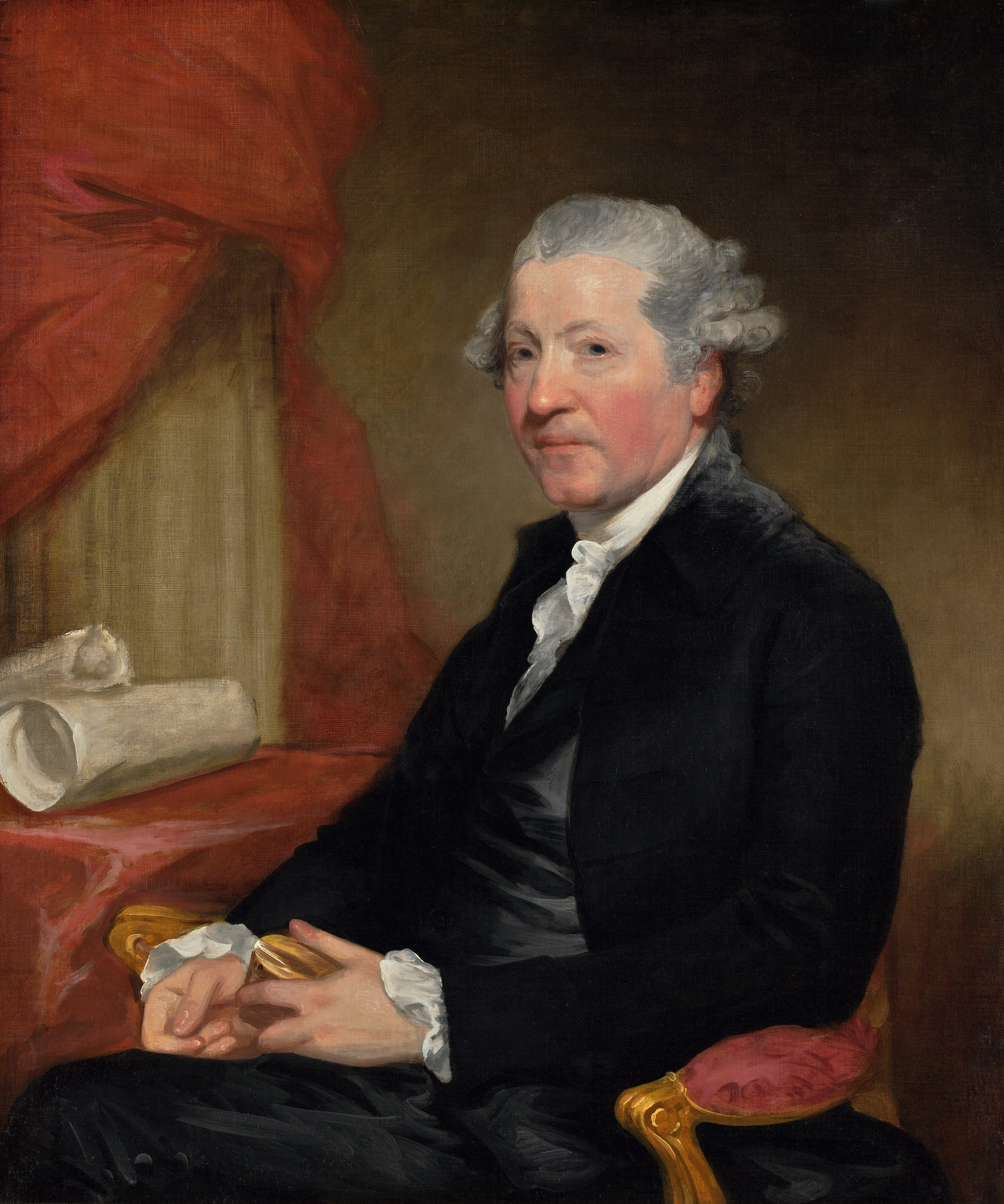
Portrait of Joshua Reynolds (Gilbert Stuart, 1784)

Some people, such as Hester Lynch Piozzi, construed Reynolds' equable calm as cool and unfeeling. It is to this lukewarm temperament that Frederick W. Hilles, Bodman Professor of English Literature at Yale attributes Reynolds' never having married. In the editorial notes of his compendium Portraits by Sir Joshua Reynolds, Hilles theorises that "as a corollary one might say that he [Reynolds] was somewhat lacking in a capacity for love", and cites Boswell's notary papers: "He said the reason he would never marry was that every woman whom he liked had grown indifferent to him, and he had been glad he did not marry her." Reynolds' own sister, Frances, who lived with him as housekeeper, took her own negative opinion further still, thinking him "a gloomy tyrant". The presence of family compensated Reynolds for the absence of a wife; he wrote on one occasion to his friend Bennet Langton, that both his sister and niece were away from home "so that I am quite a bachelor". Reynolds did not marry, and had no known children.

Biographer Ian McIntyre discusses the possibility of Reynolds having enjoyed sexual relations with certain clients, such as Nelly O'Brien (or "My Lady O'Brien", as he playfully dubbed her) and Kitty Fisher, who visited his house for more sittings than were strictly necessary. Dan Cruickshank in his book London's Sinful Secret summarised Reynolds as having visited and re-visited various reputed red light districts in London after his return from Italy as a possible contributor to his medical condition and appearance due to commonly contracted disease in those areas of London.

Regarding the British debate over the abolition of slavery, the abolitionist Thomas Clarkson wrote that Reynolds stated his opposition to the Atlantic slave trade at a dinner with a group of friends with Clarkson present. Clarkson had shown the group samples of cloth produced in Africa, and Reynolds "gave his unqualified approbation of the abolition of this cruel traffic". Reynolds also subscribed to the 1791 edition of Ottobah Cugoano's abolitionist work Thoughts and Sentiments on the Evil and Wicked Traffic of the Slavery and Commerce of the Human Species, and had a Black servant who joined his household around the mid-1760s. The servant's name is unknown despite Northcote suggesting in Memoirs of Sir Joshua Reynolds (1813) that he modelled for several of Reynolds' paintings. Northcote also claimed in Memoirs that the servant had been brought to Britain by Mary Mordaunt, the wife of Valentine Morris, though the 1813 work contains "inconsistencies and conflicting chronologies".

== Reynolds Research Project ==
In 2010, the Wallace Collection launched the Reynolds Research Project. With the support of the Paul Mellon Centre for Studies in British Art, and in partnership with the National Gallery and in collaboration with the Yale Center for British Art, work was undertaken to conserve the museum's portraits to improve their visual appreciation for future generations and to investigate the ways in which they were painted.

The purpose of an exhibition and accompanying catalogue, Joshua Reynolds: Experiments in Paint, 2015, was to share the discoveries of the project and to reveal Reynolds's complex and experimental engagement with painterly materials over the course of his long career. A series of thematic groupings of works from the collection with temporary loans allowed the curators to explore the development of Reynolds's images from both a technical and art historical viewpoint.

As well as exploring his experimentation with materials, the project also revealed the innovative ways in which Reynolds collaborated with his patrons; played with the conventions of genre, composition and pose; engaged with the work of other artists; and organised the submission and display of his work at exhibitions. The commissioning and collecting of Reynolds's work, specifically in the context of the founders of the Wallace Collection (the Seymour-Conway family), was also examined.

== Gallery ==
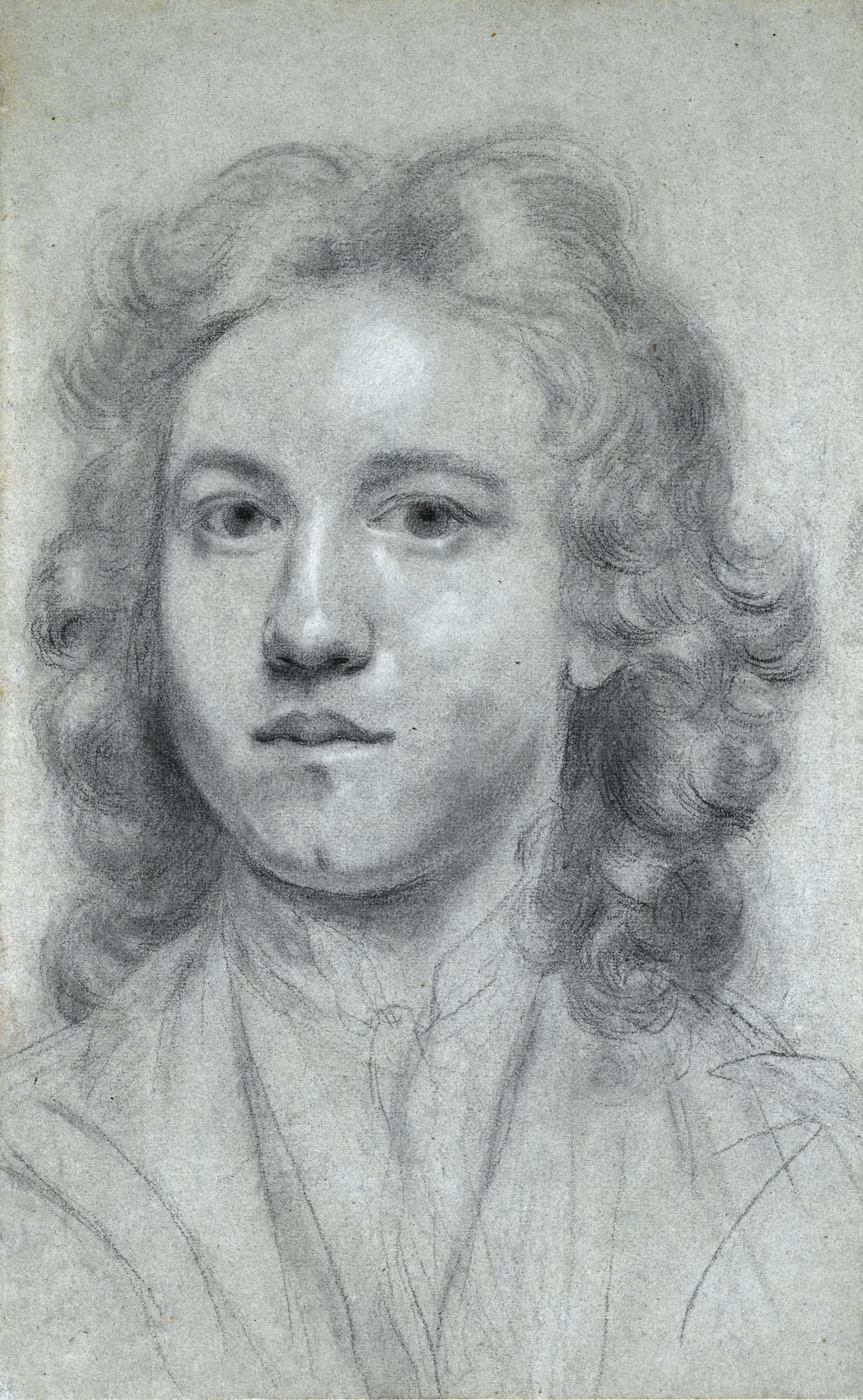
Self Portrait, c. 1740

Portrait of John Hamilton (1746)

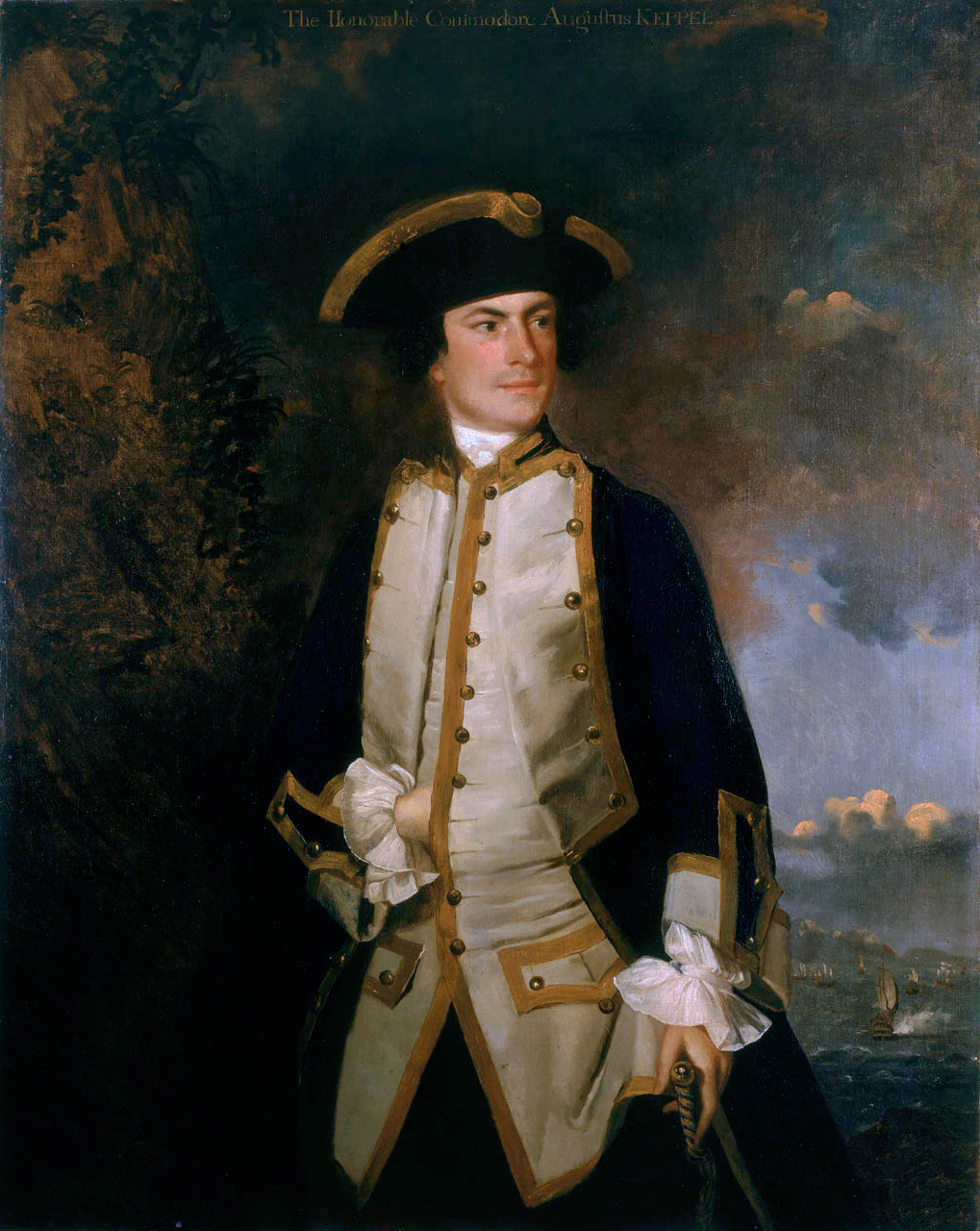
Portrait of Augustus Keppel (1749), Reynolds's first portrait of Keppel

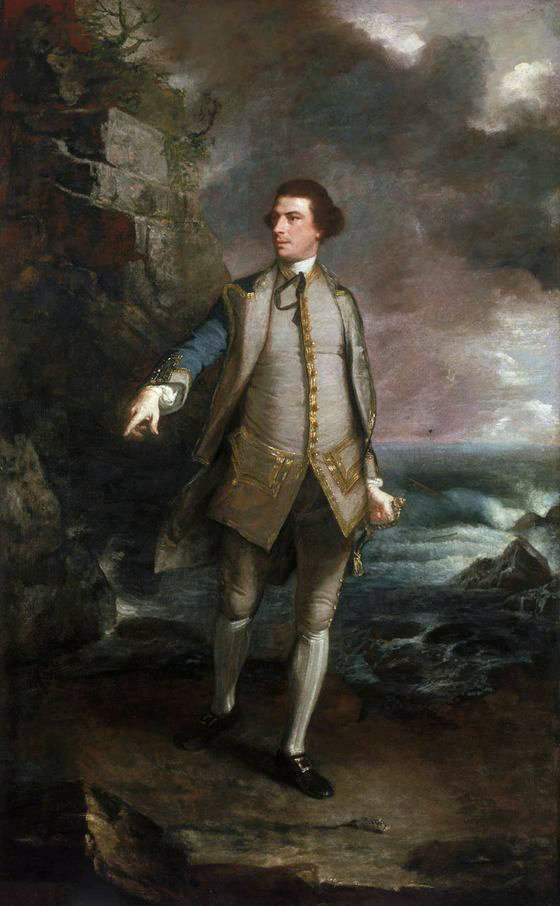
Captain the Honourable Augustus Keppel in the pose of the Apollo Belvedere (1753)

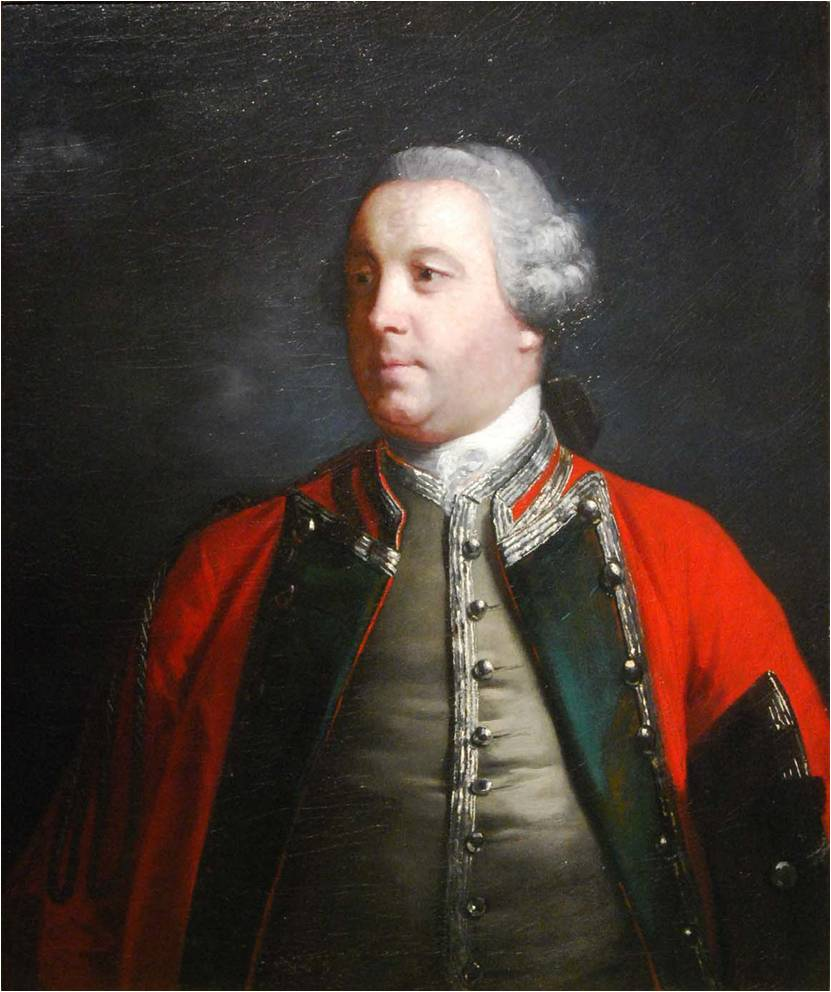
Edward Cornwallis (1756)

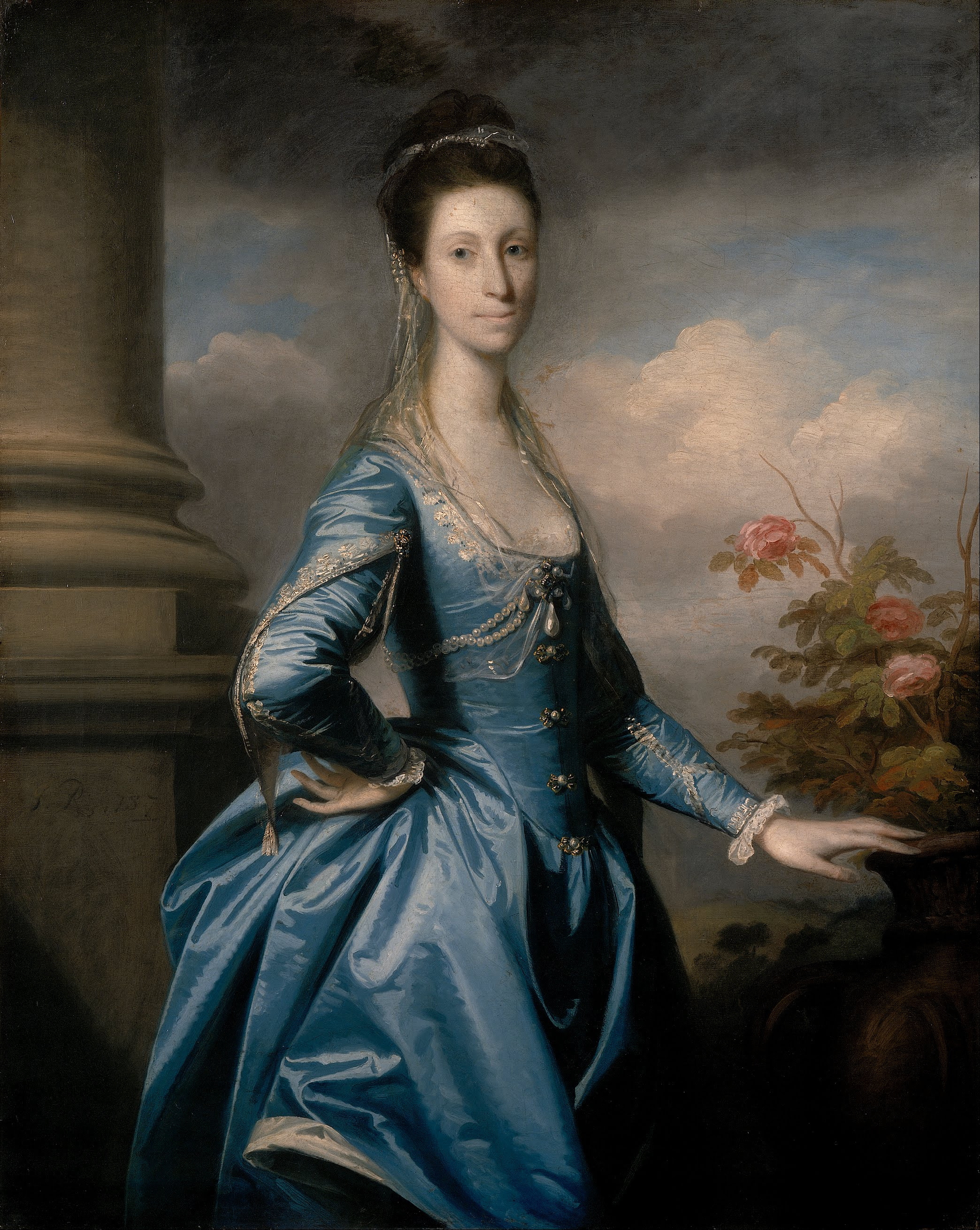
Miss Elizabeth Ingram (1757), Walker Art Gallery, Liverpool

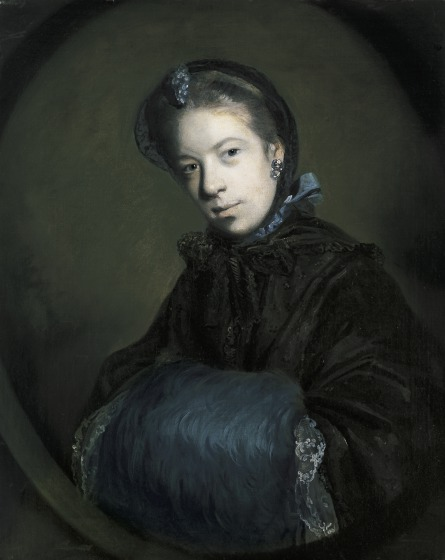
Portrait of Miss Mary Pelham (c. 1757), Dallas Museum of Art

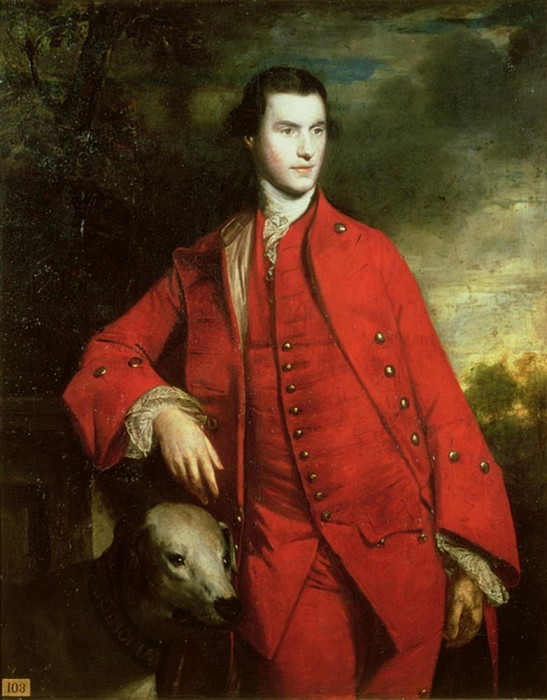
Charles Lennox, 3rd Duke of Richmond (1758)

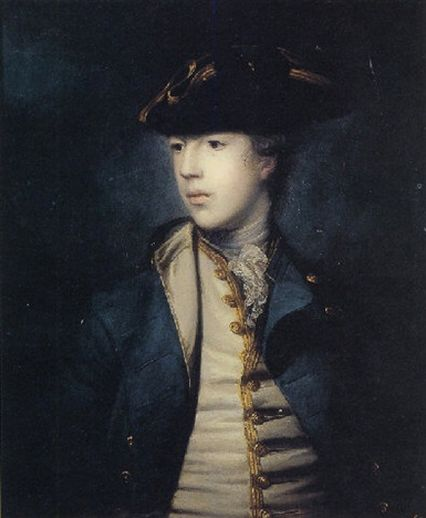
Francis Reynolds-Moreton (Royal Navy officer) (1758)

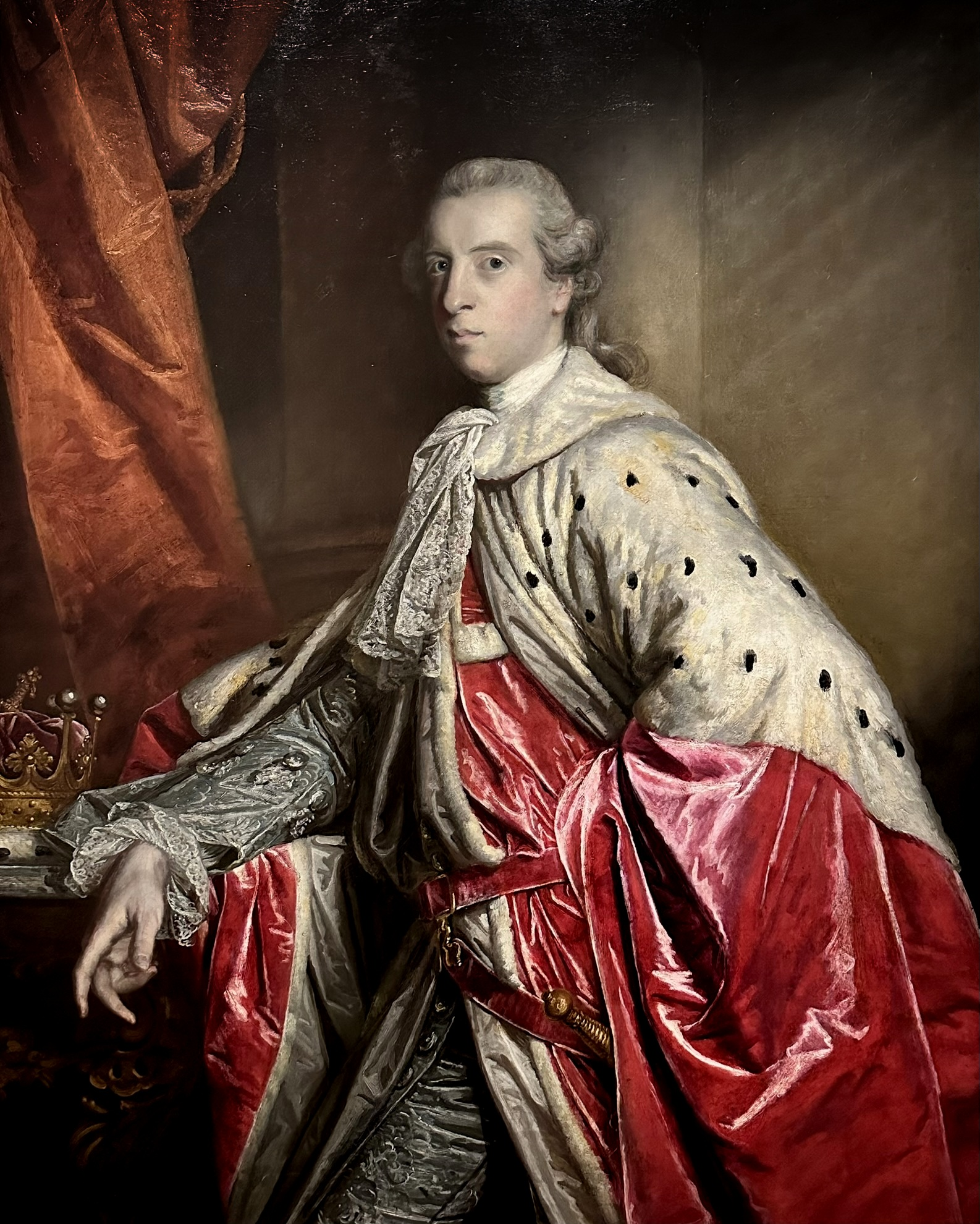
Henry Yelverton, Third Earl of Essex (1758-1759), Museum of the Shenandoah Valley

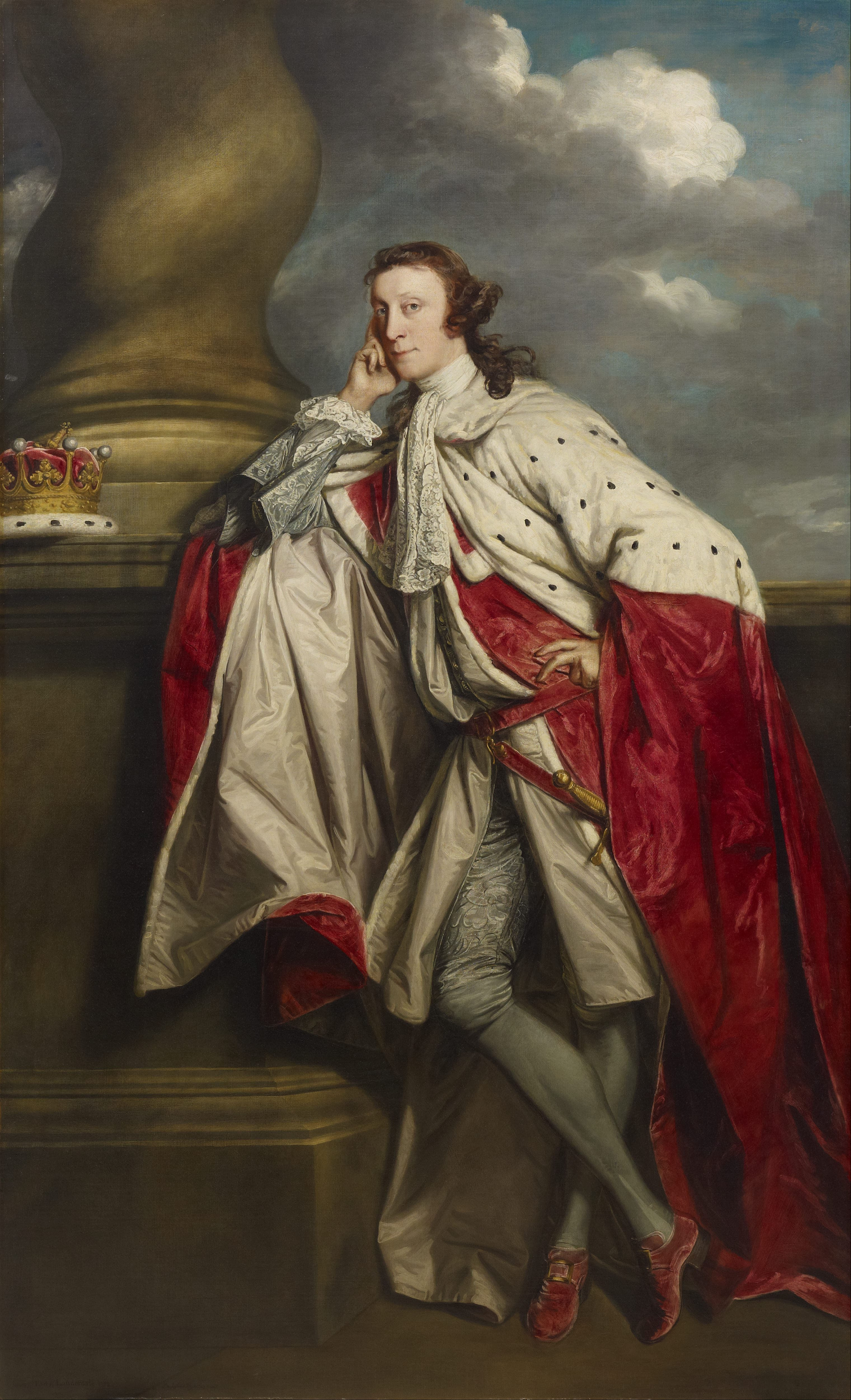
James, 7th Earl of Lauderdale (1759–1760), Art Gallery of New South Wales

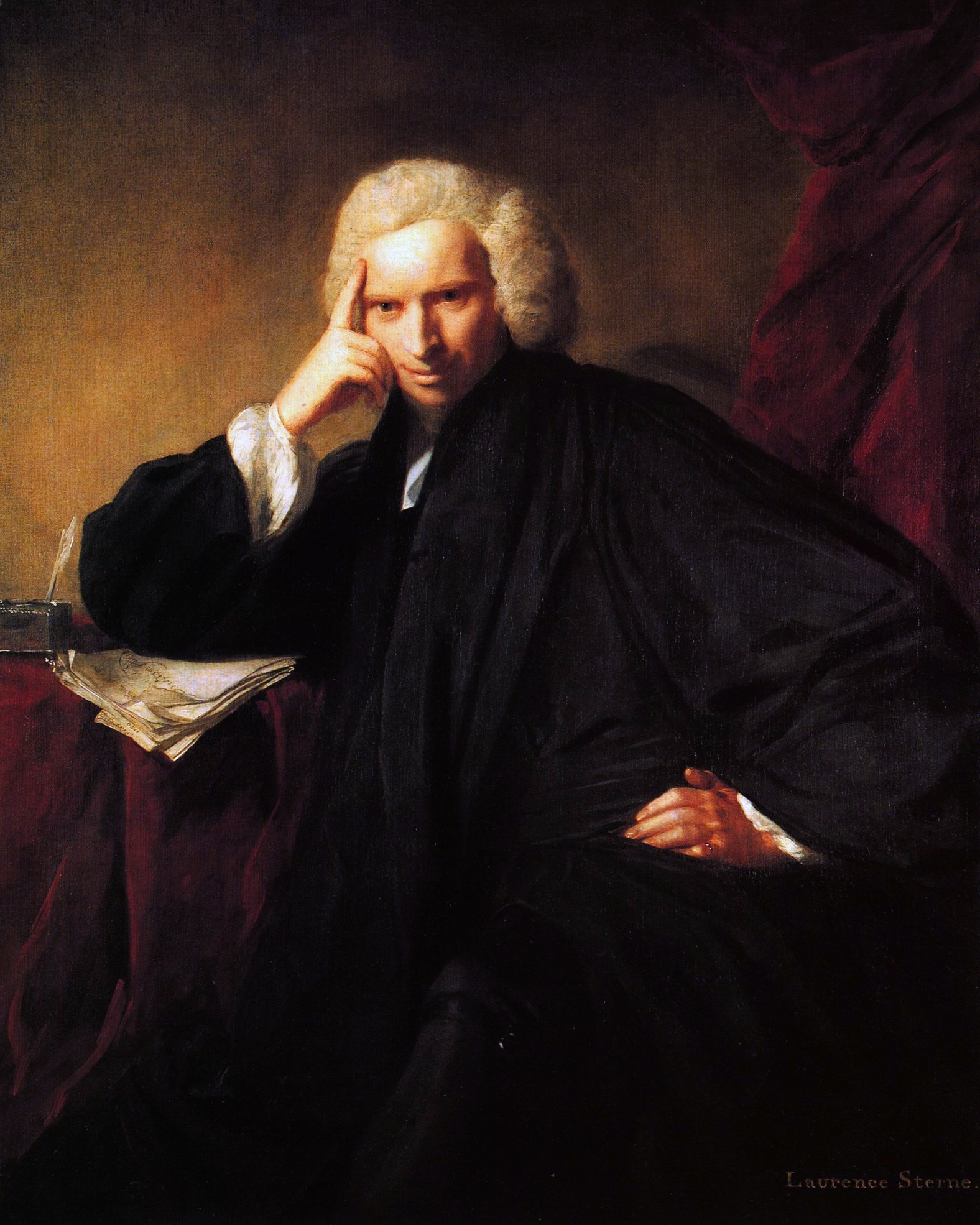
Portrait of Laurence Sterne, 1760

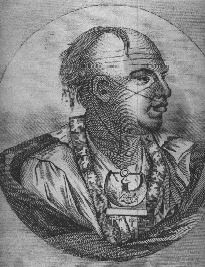
Cherokee Chief Ostenaco (1763)

Philip Gell (1763)

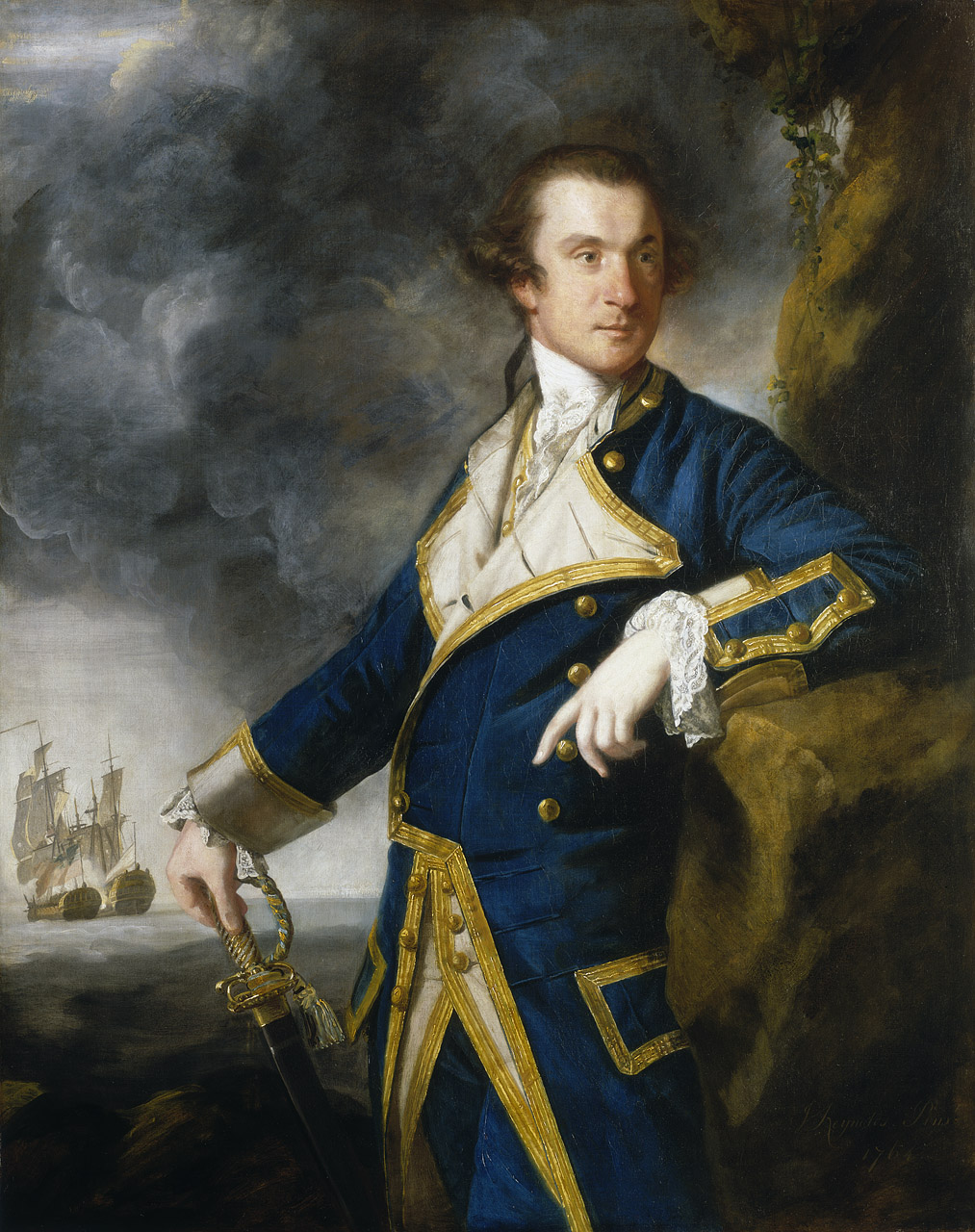
Portrait of Alexander Hood (1763)

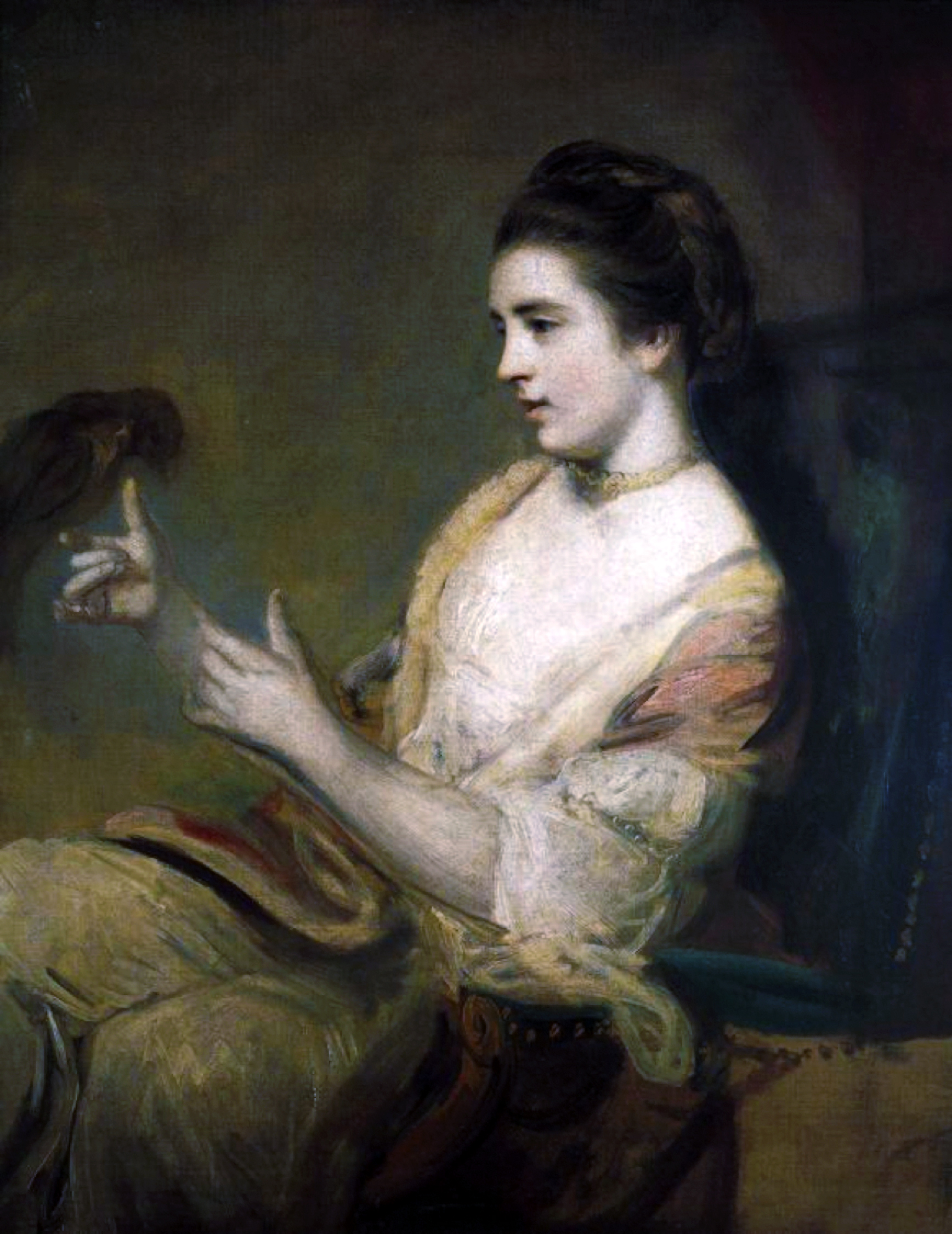
Kitty Fisher and Parrott (1763–1764)

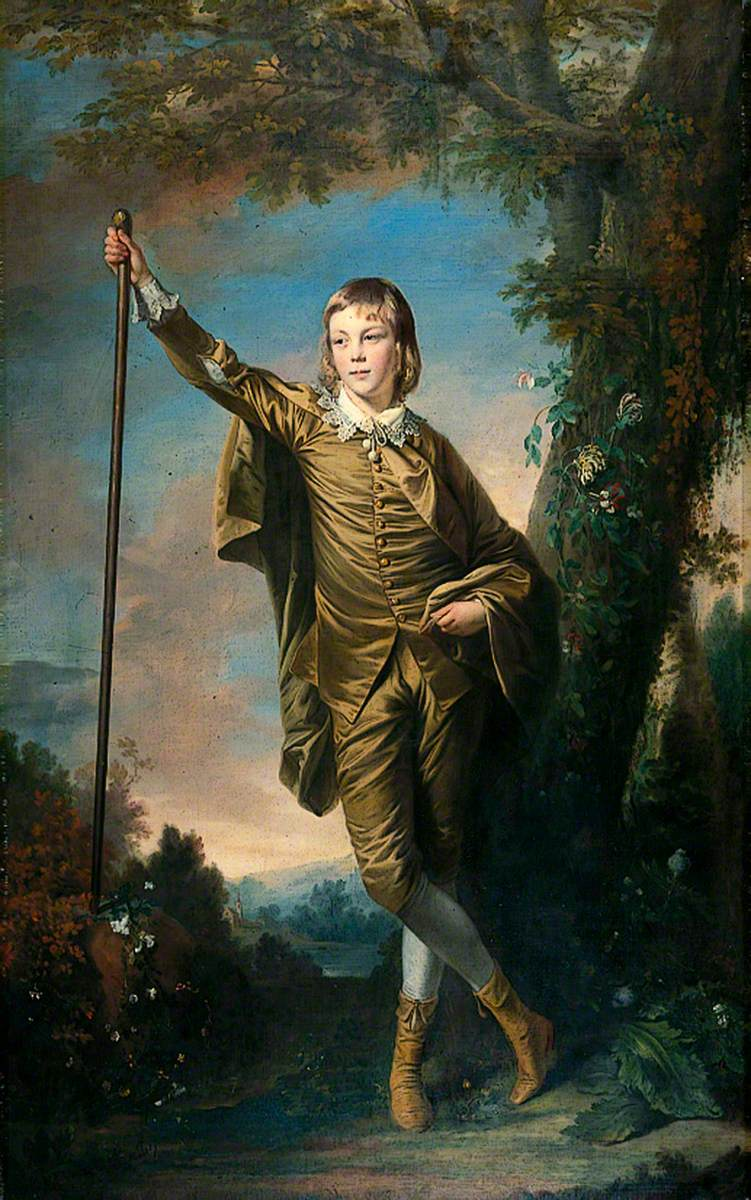
The Brown Boy (1764)

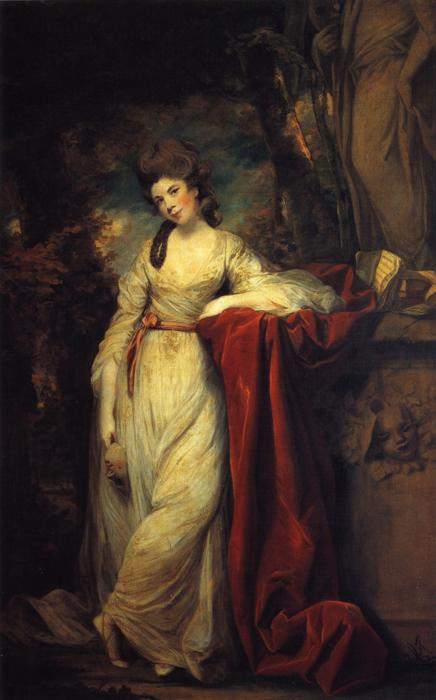
Mrs Abington as The Comic Muse (1764–1768), Waddesdon Manor

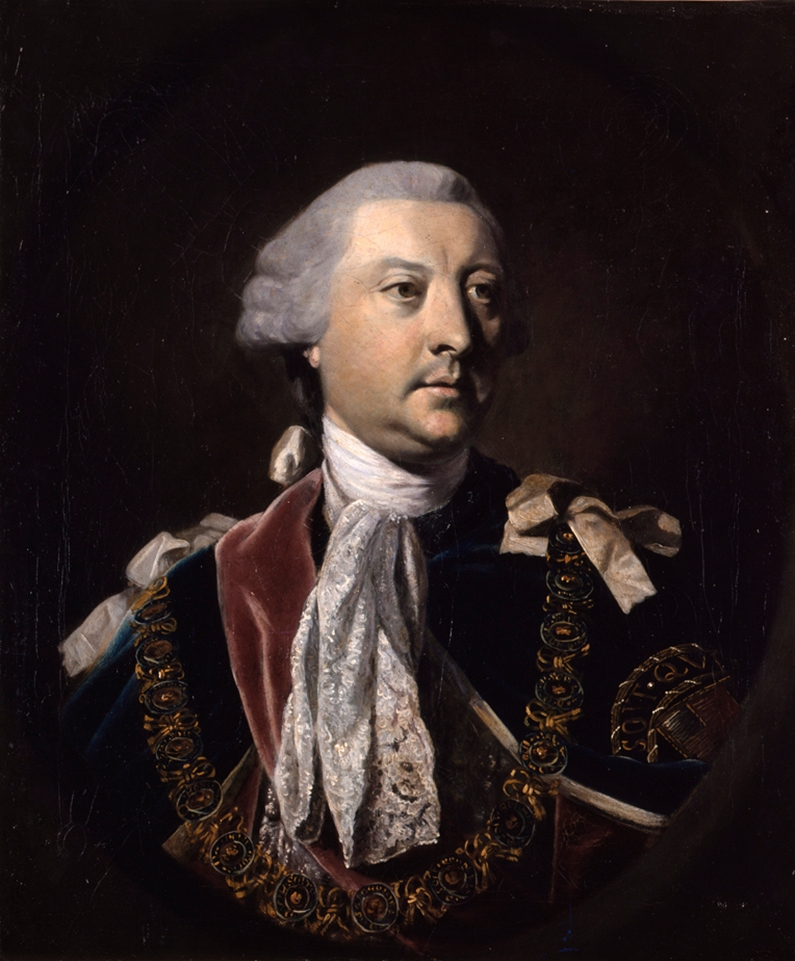
George Montagu-Dunk, 2nd Earl of Halifax (1764)

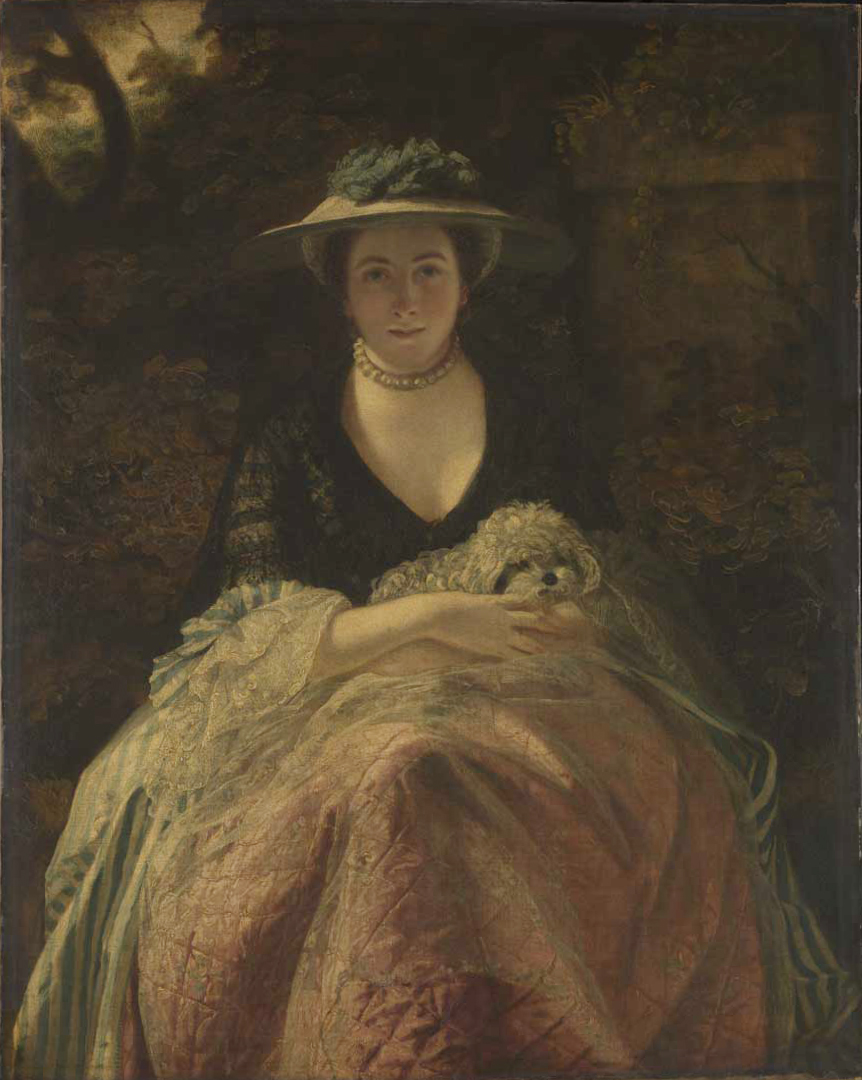
Portrait of Nelly O'Brien, 1764

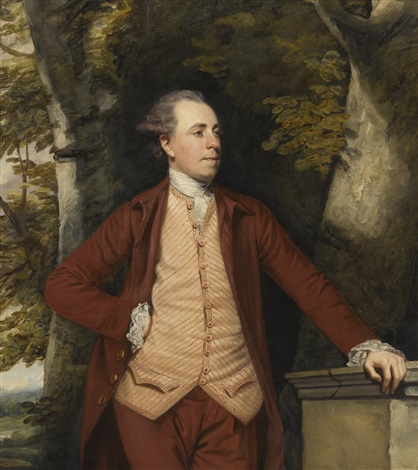
Richard Crofts of West Harling, Norfolk (1765)

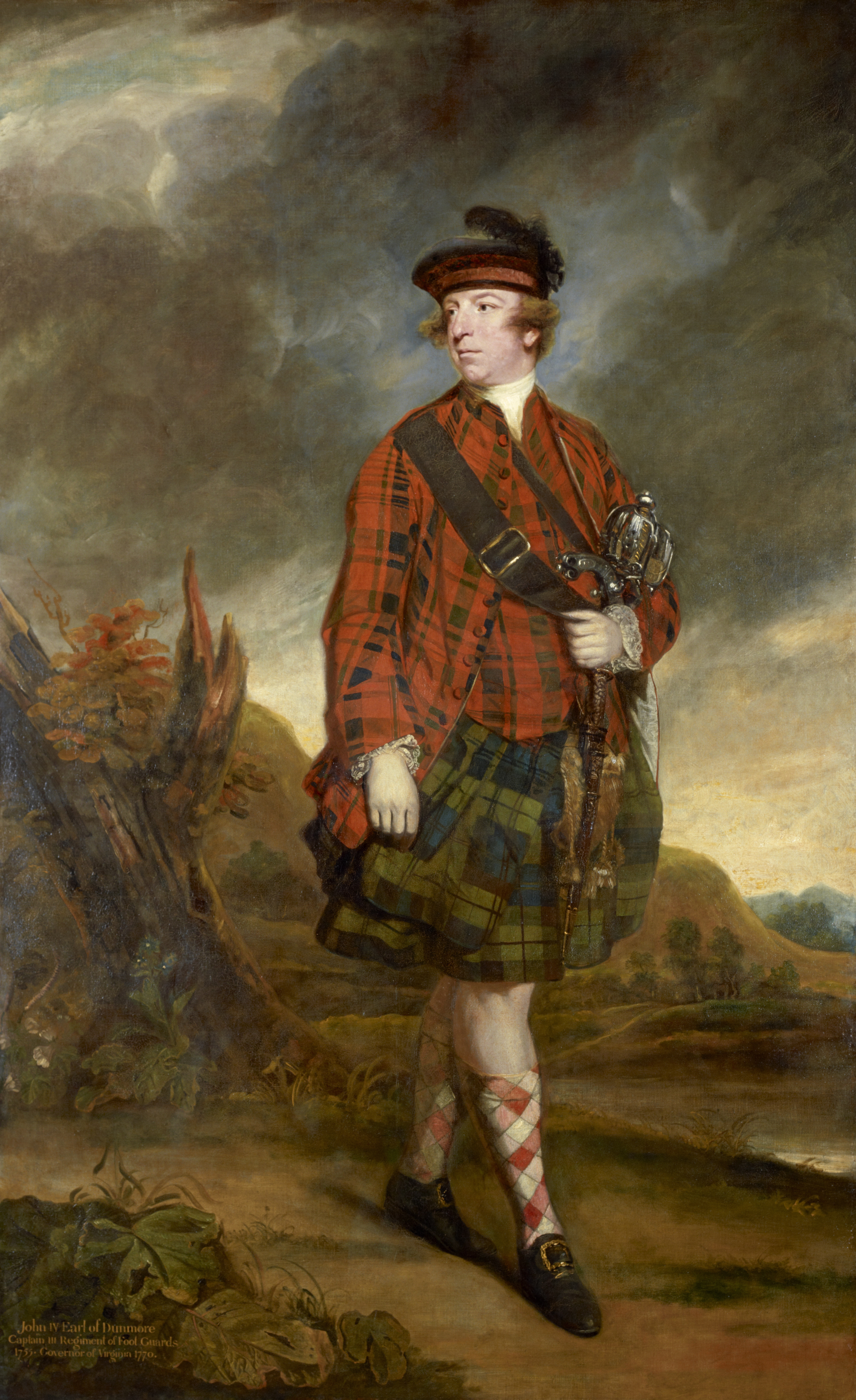
Portrait of Lord Dunmore (1765, National Gallery of Scotland

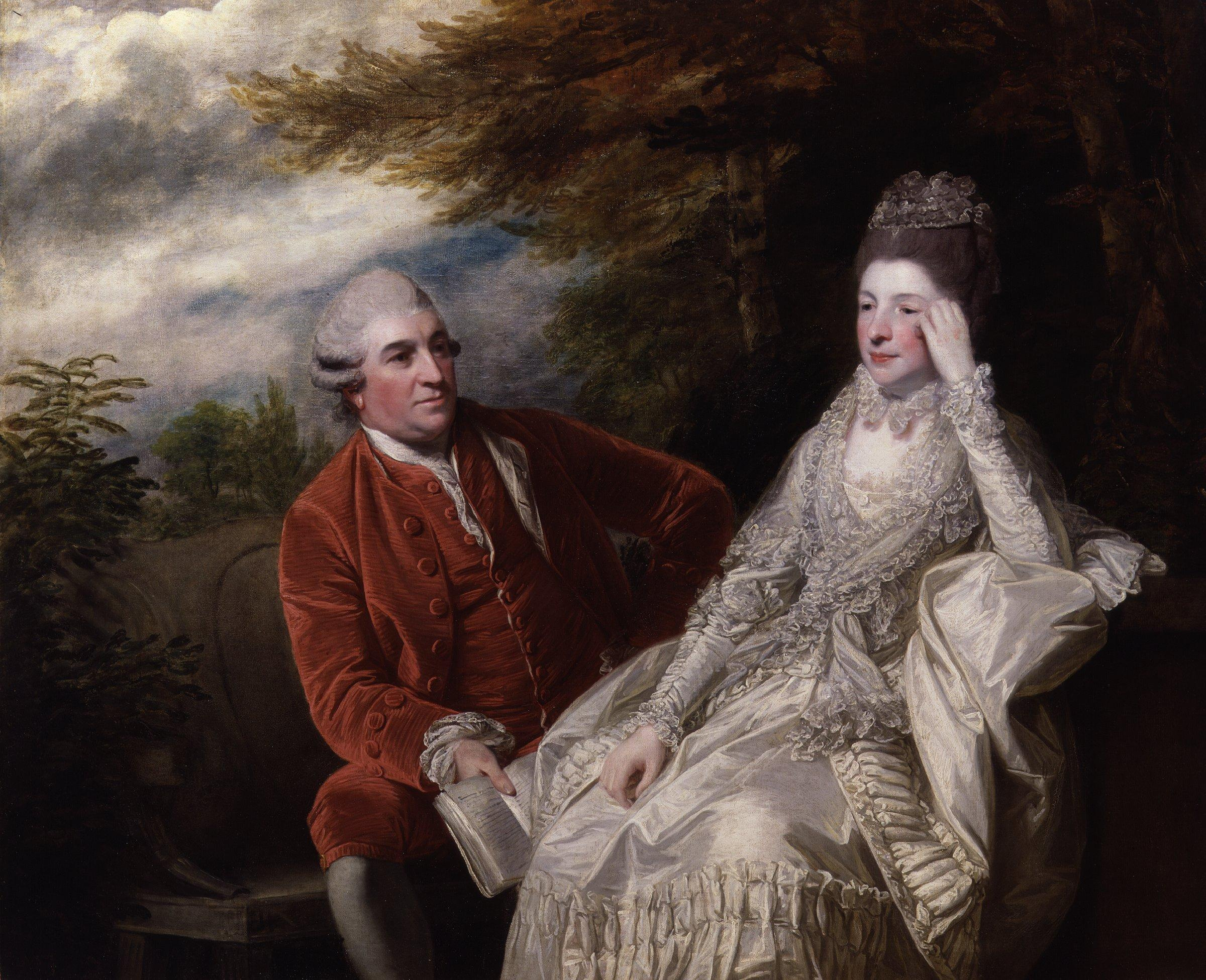
David Garrick; Eva Maria Garrick (née Veigel)

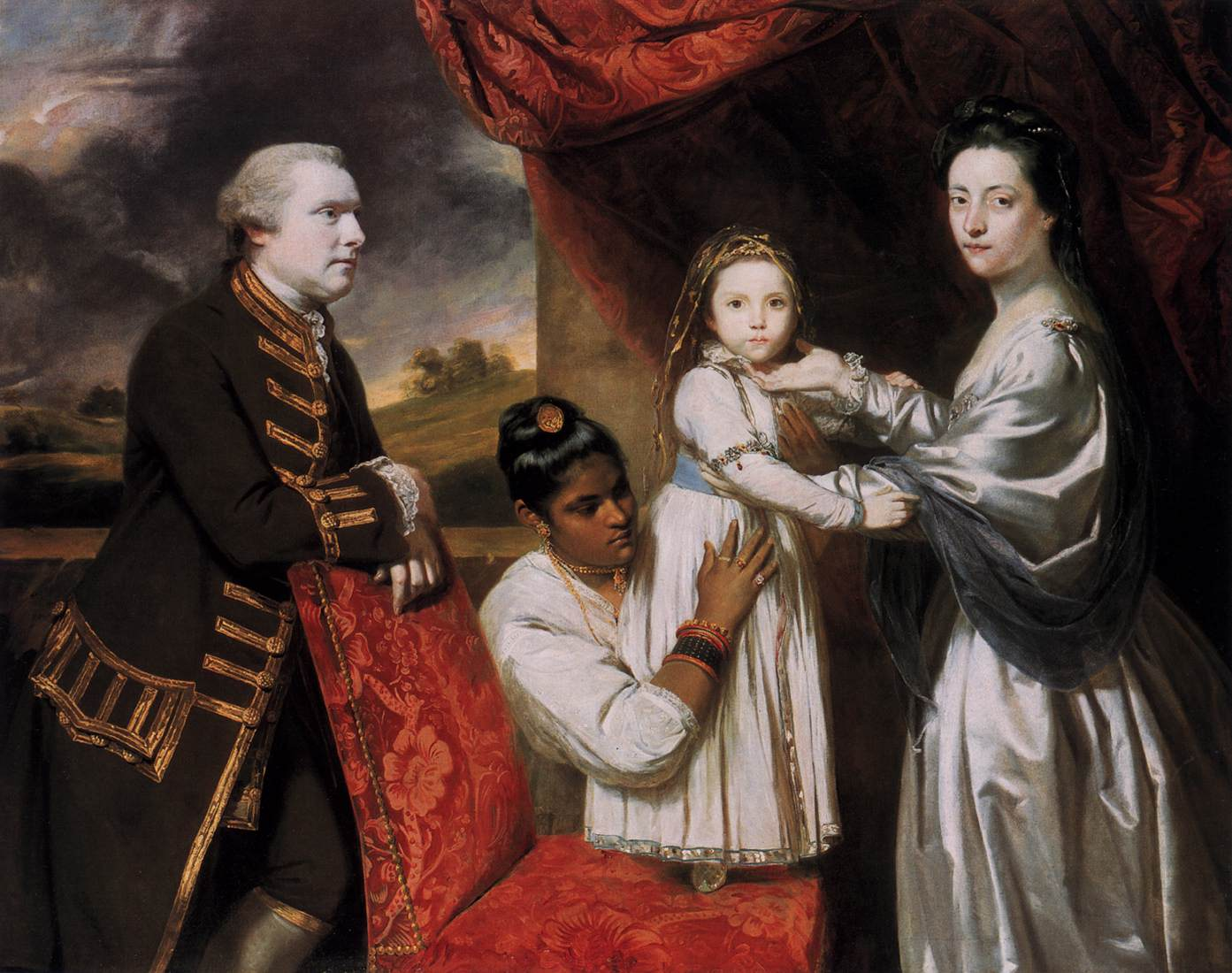
Tysoe Hancock and his family with an Indian maid (1765)

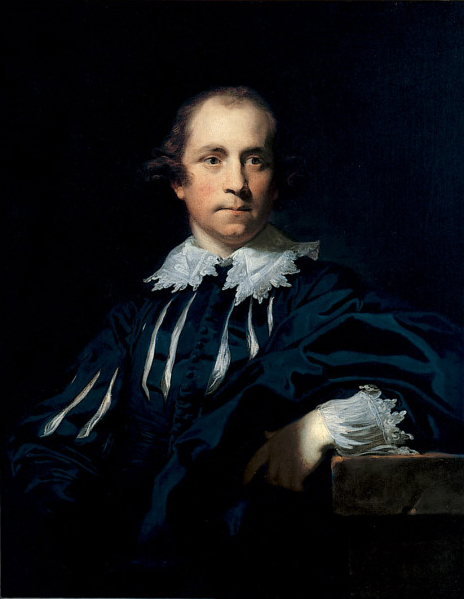
John Julius Angerstein (1765)

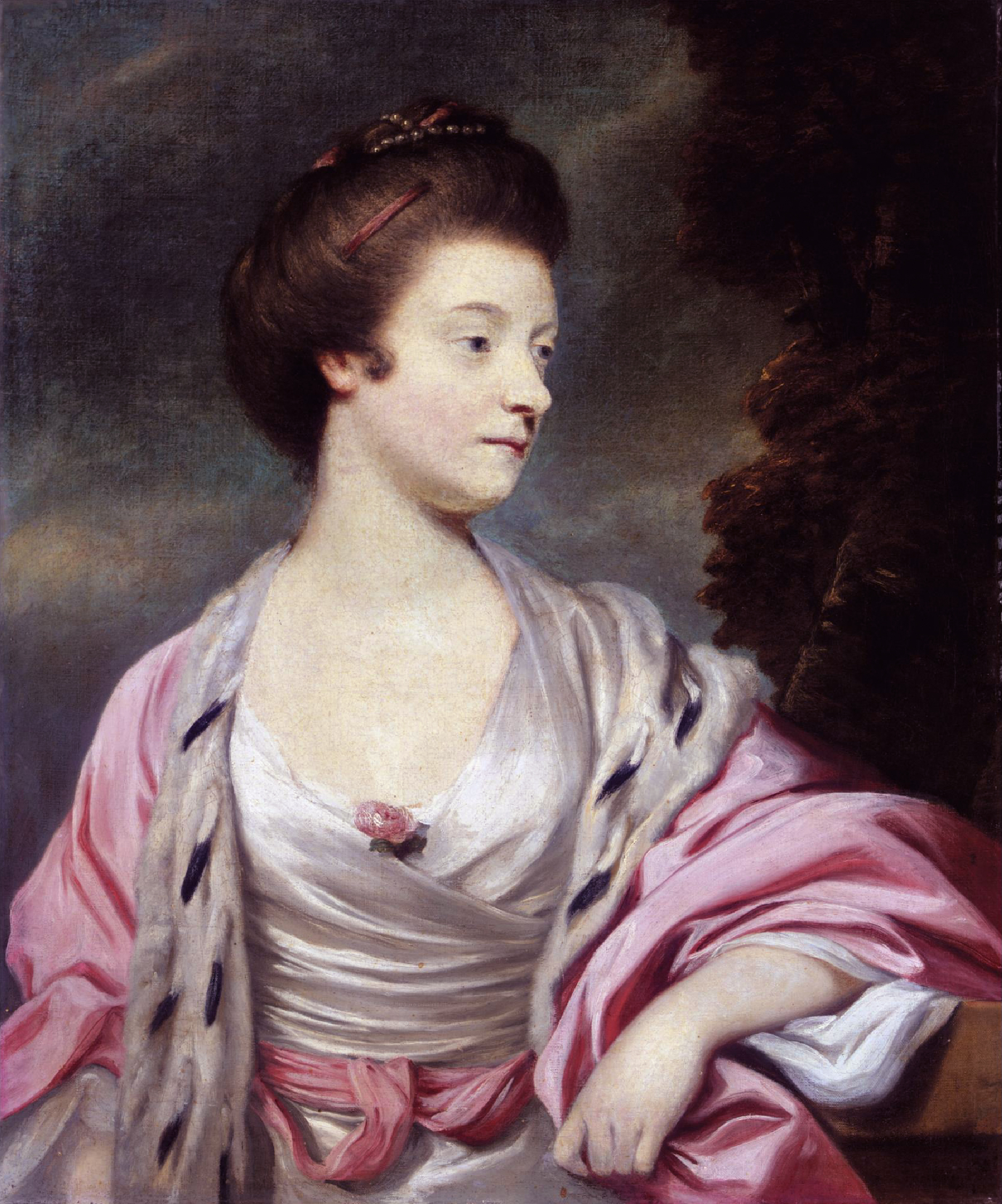
Elizabeth, Lady Amherst (1767)

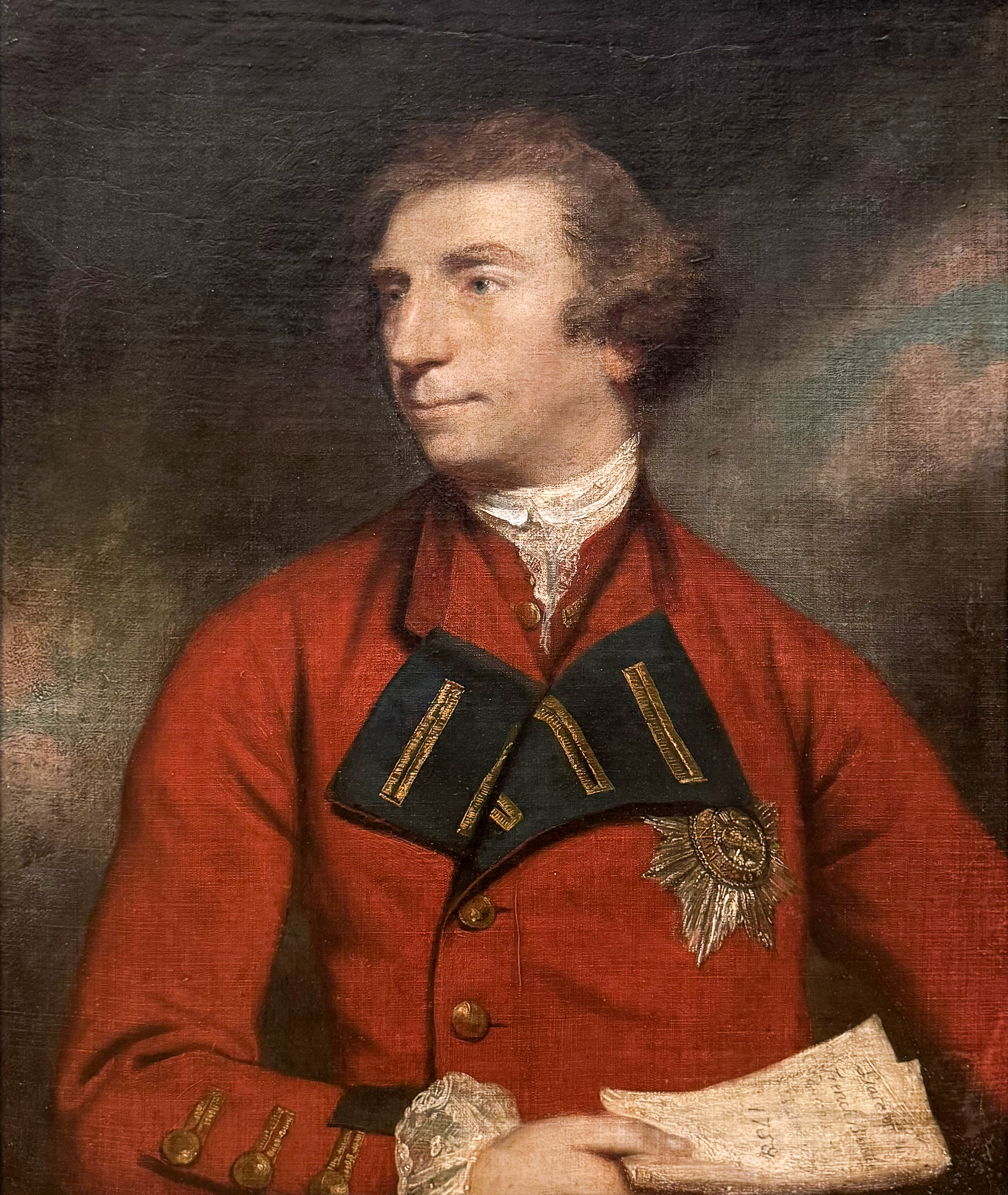
Jeffery Amherst, 1st Baron Amherst (1768)

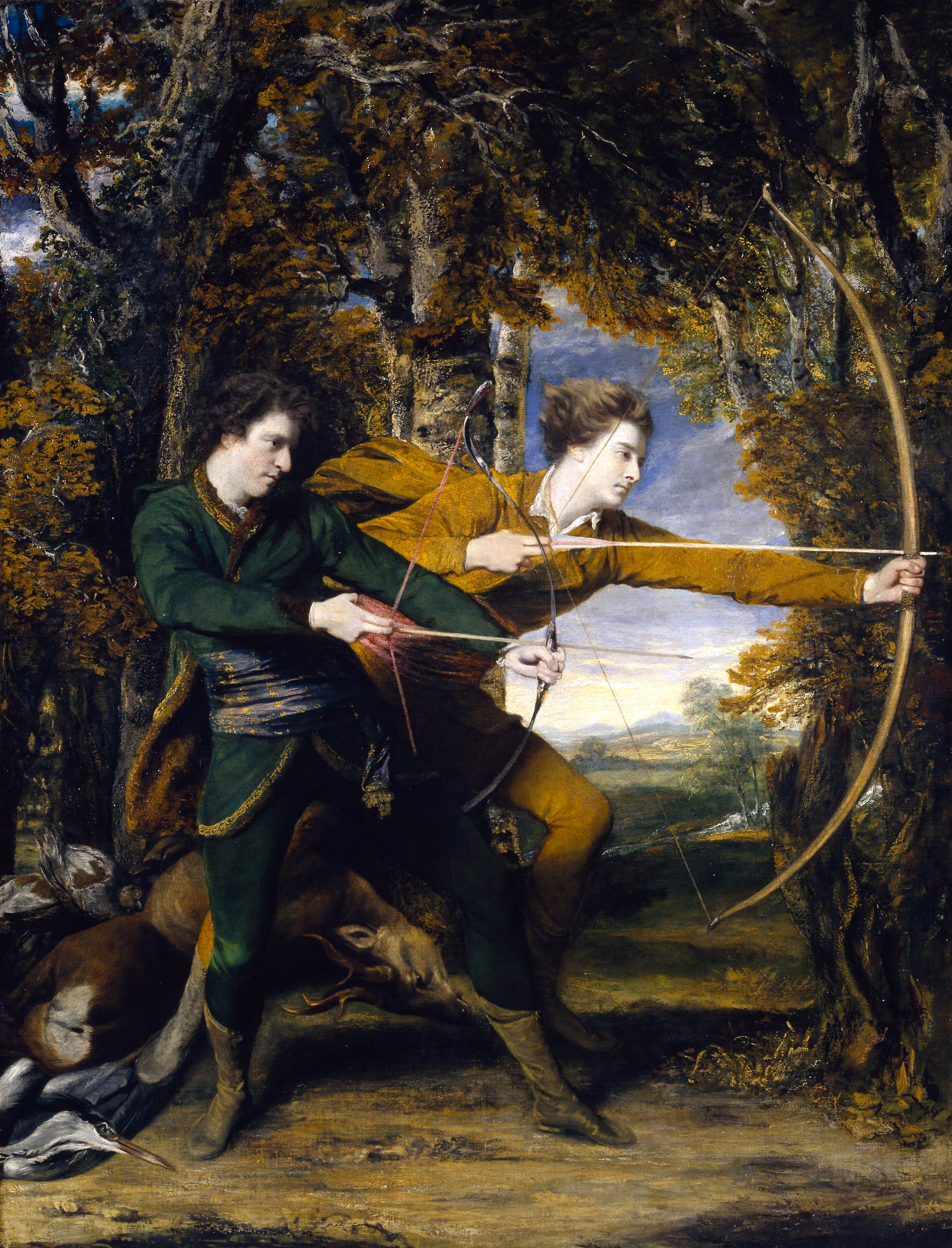
Colonel Acland and Lord Sydney, The Archers (1769)

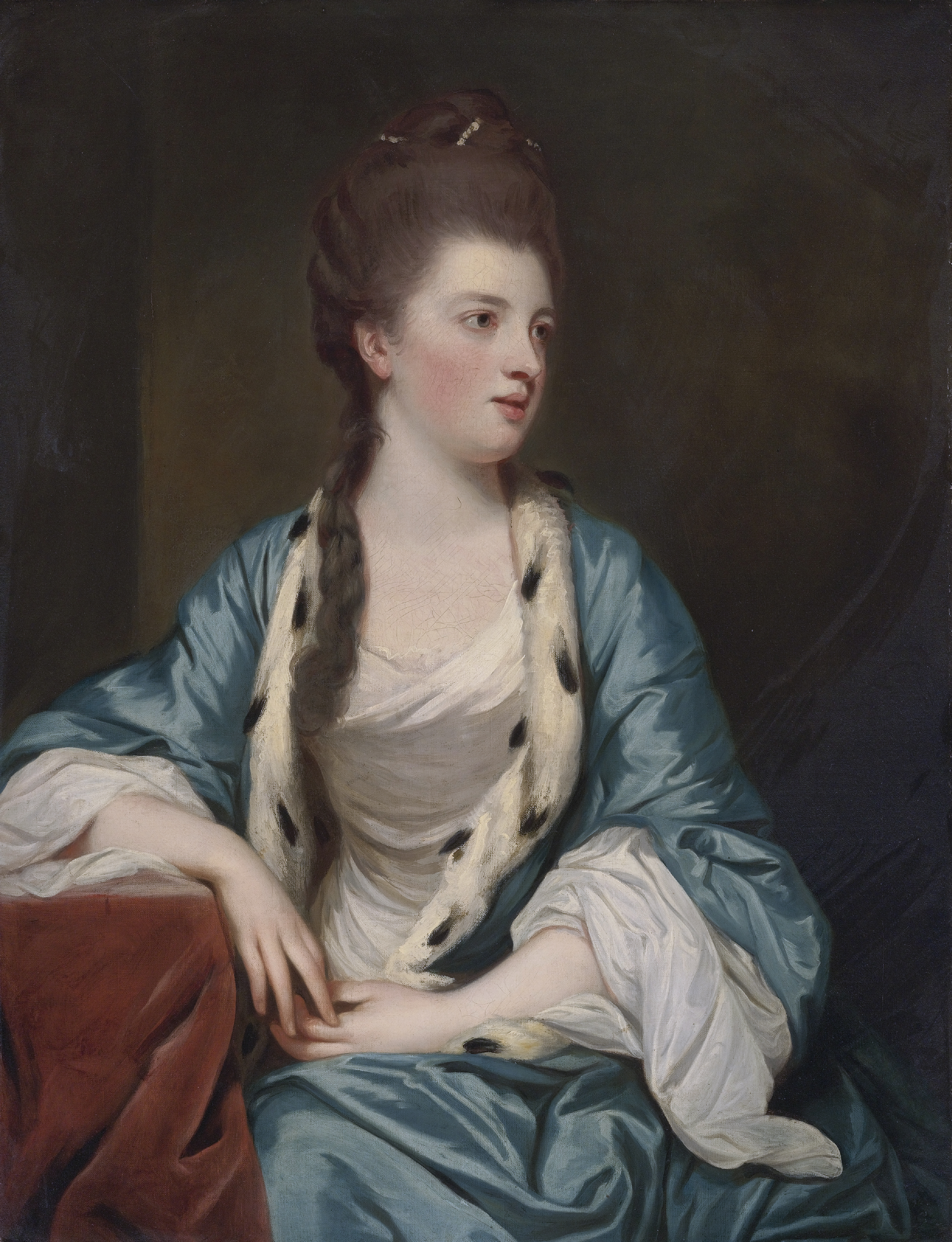
Portrait of Elizabeth Kerr (c. 1769)

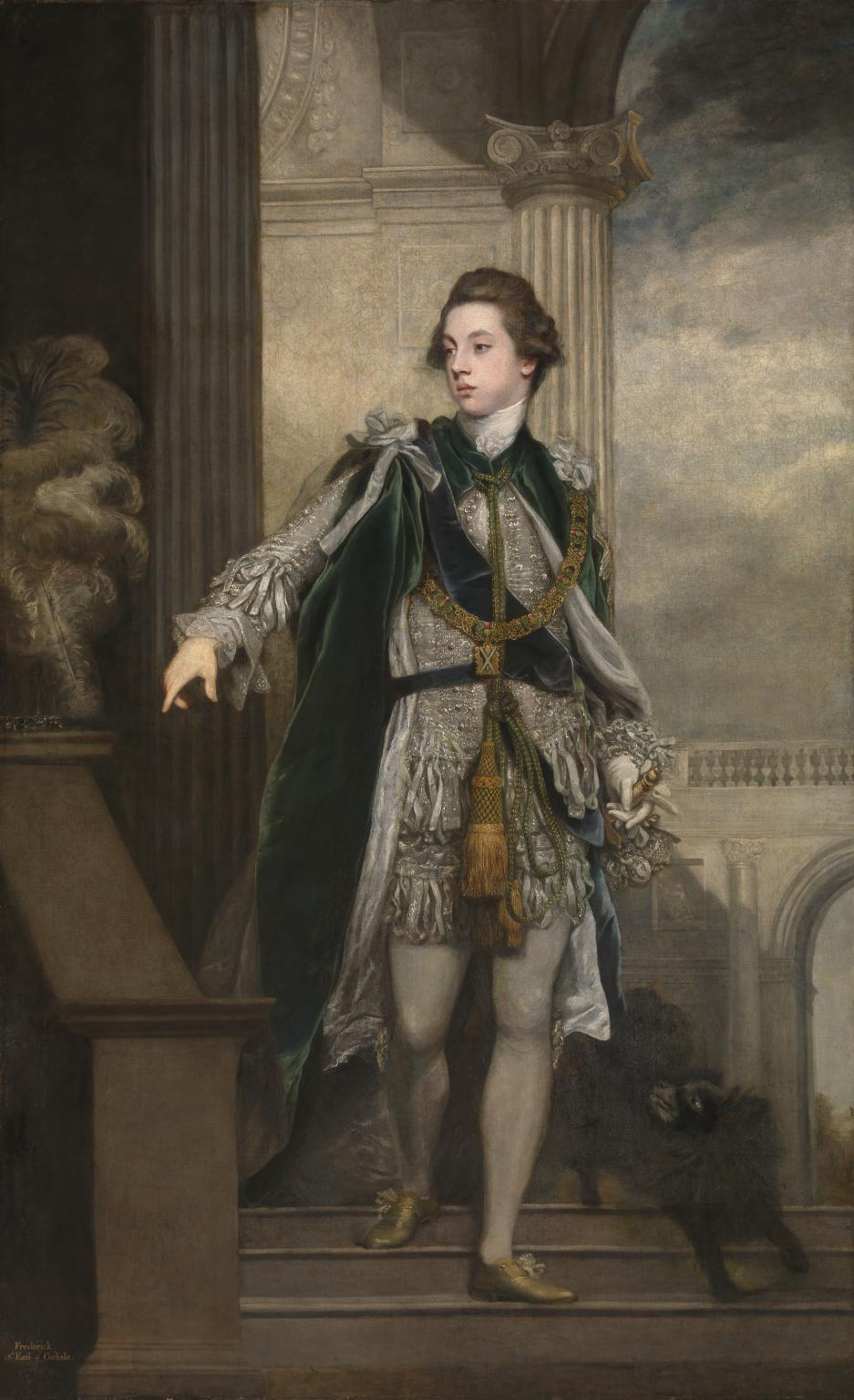
Portrait of the Earl of Carlisle (1769)

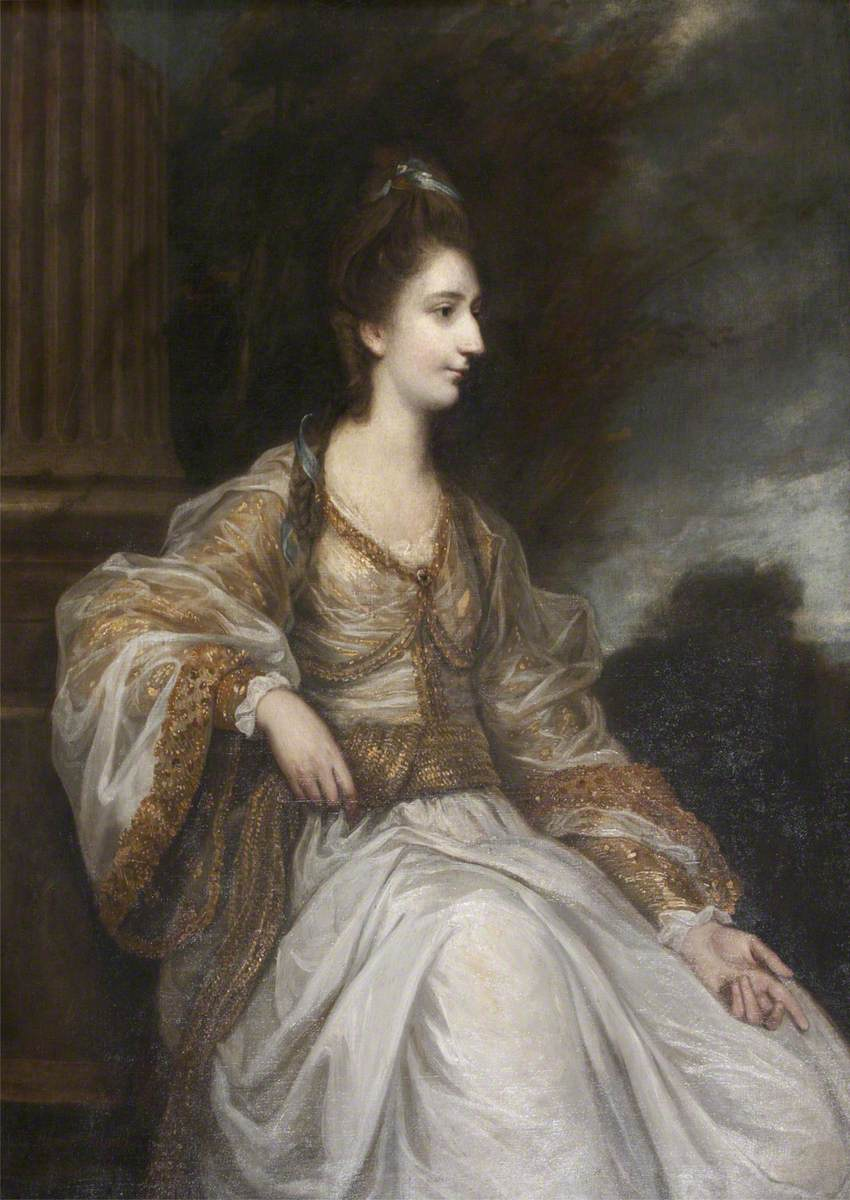
Lady Christian Acland (1771)

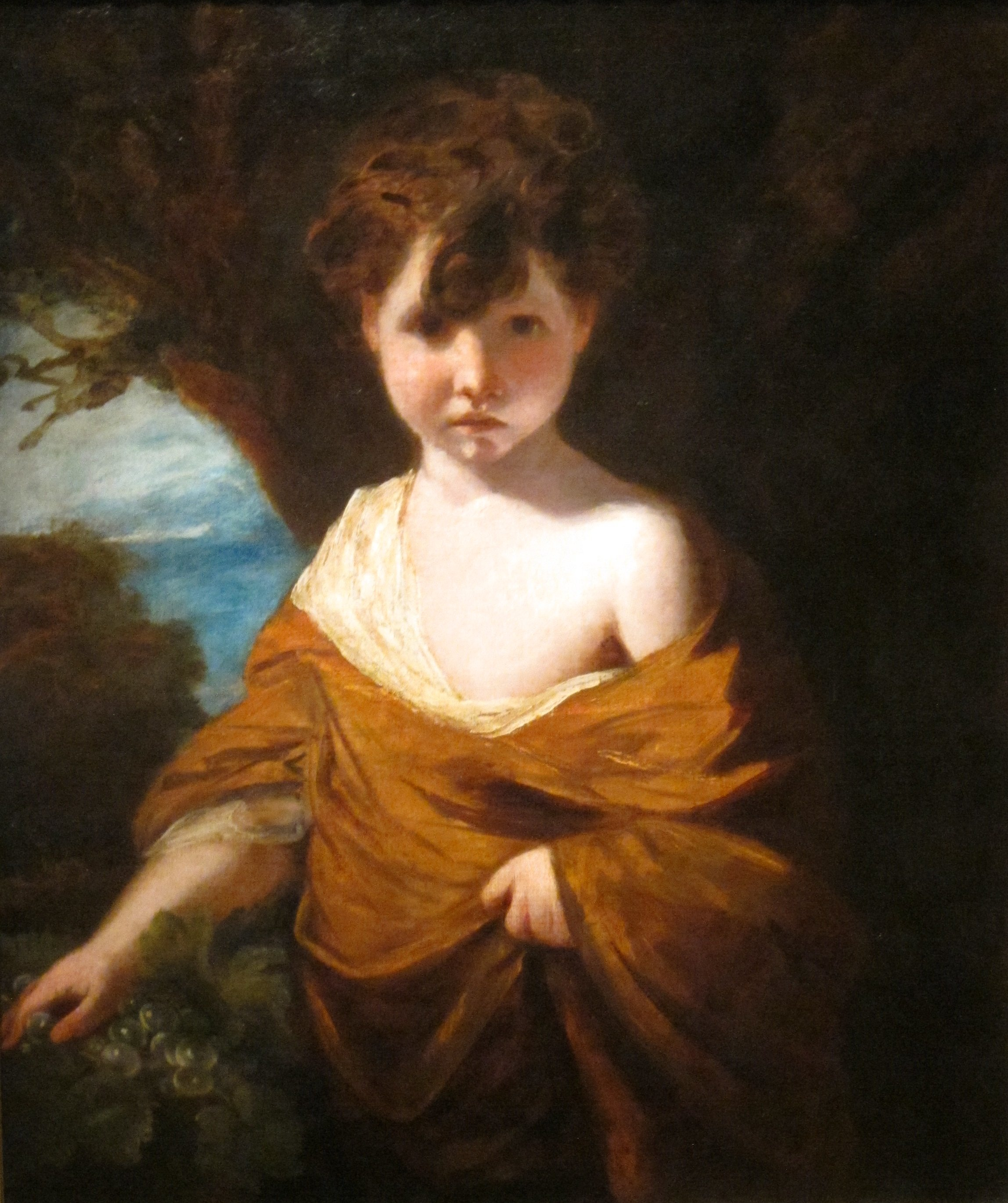
Boy with Grapes, (1773), Cincinnati Art Museum

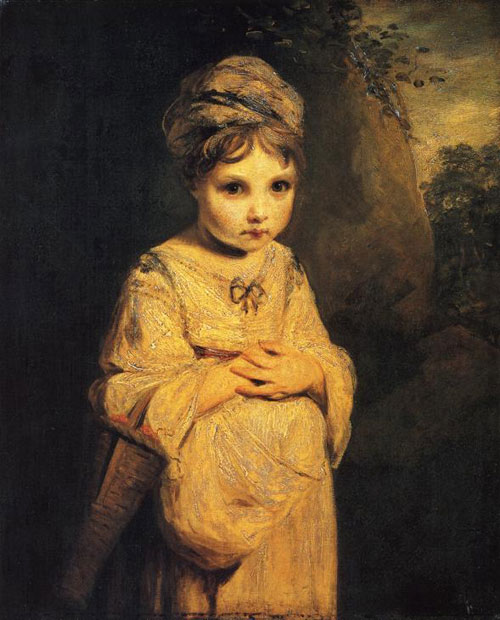
A Strawberry Girl, (1773)

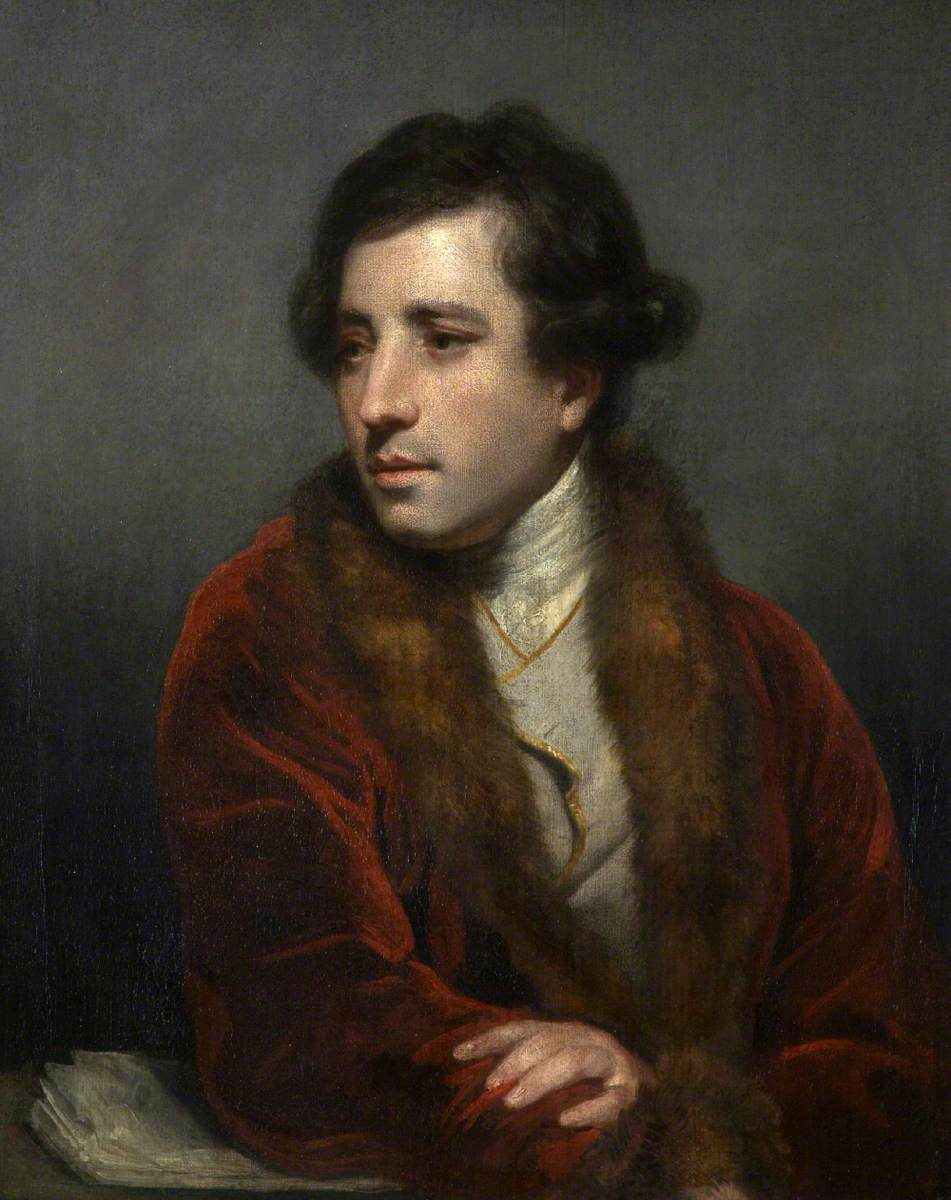
Portrait of Francesco Bartolozzi (1773)

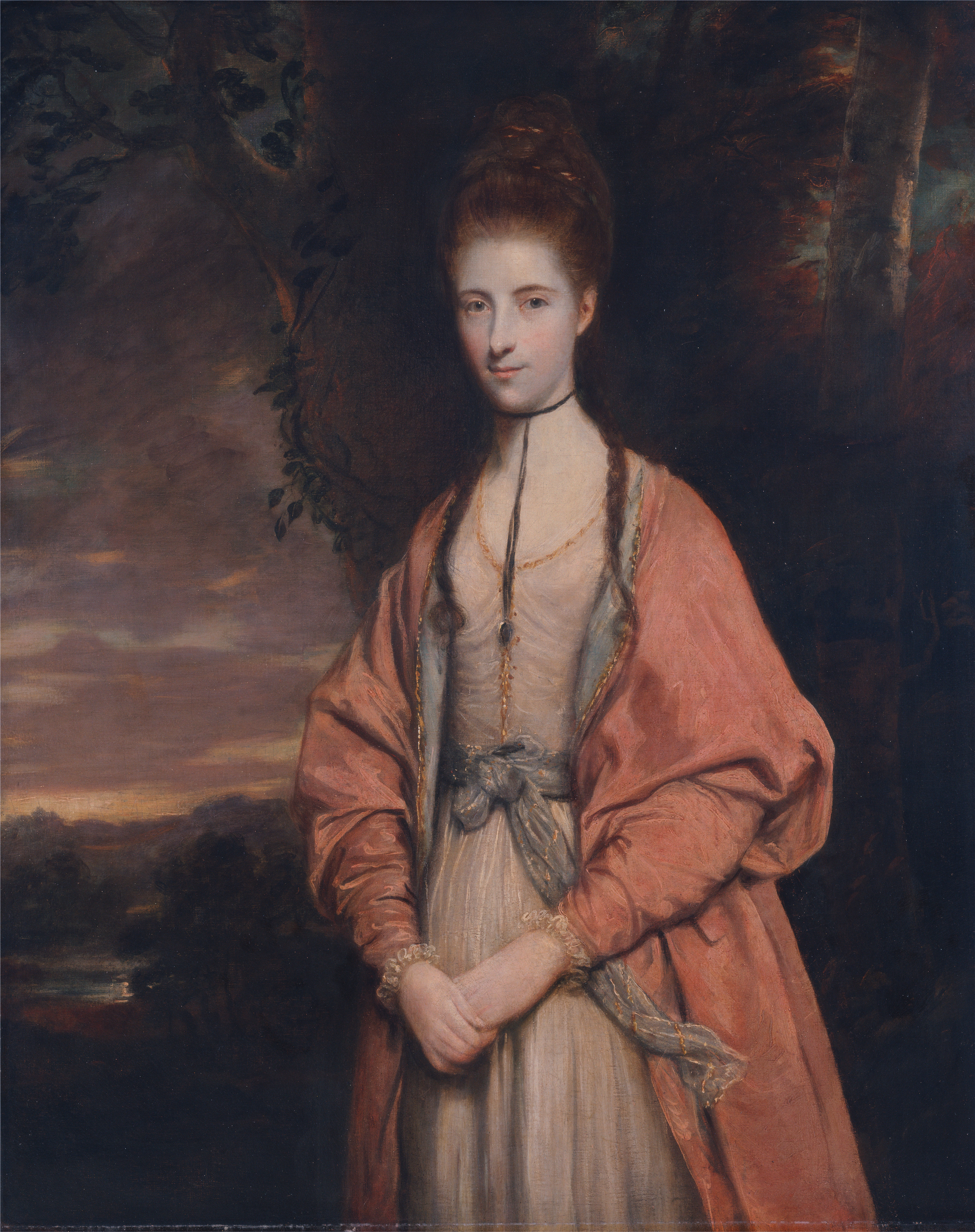
Anne Seymour Damer (1773)

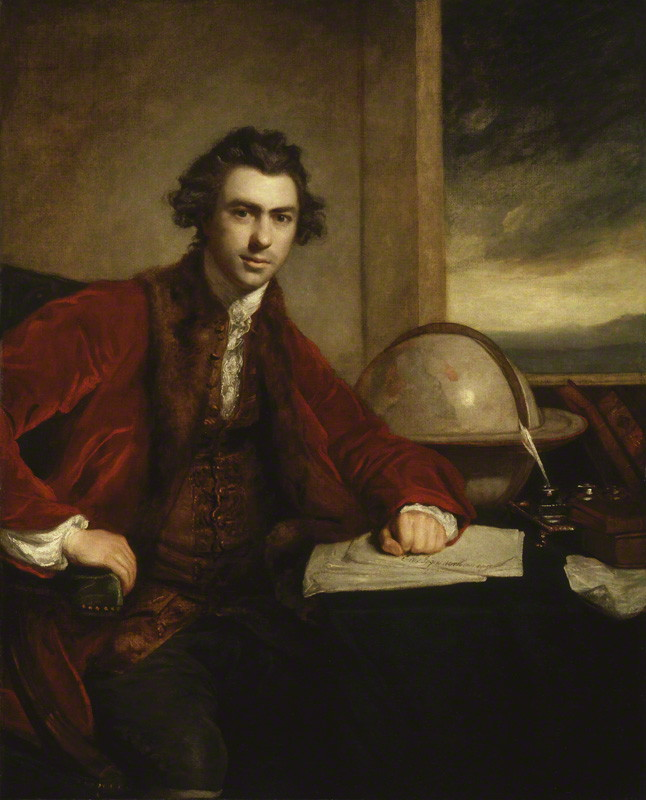
Portrait of Joseph Banks (1773)

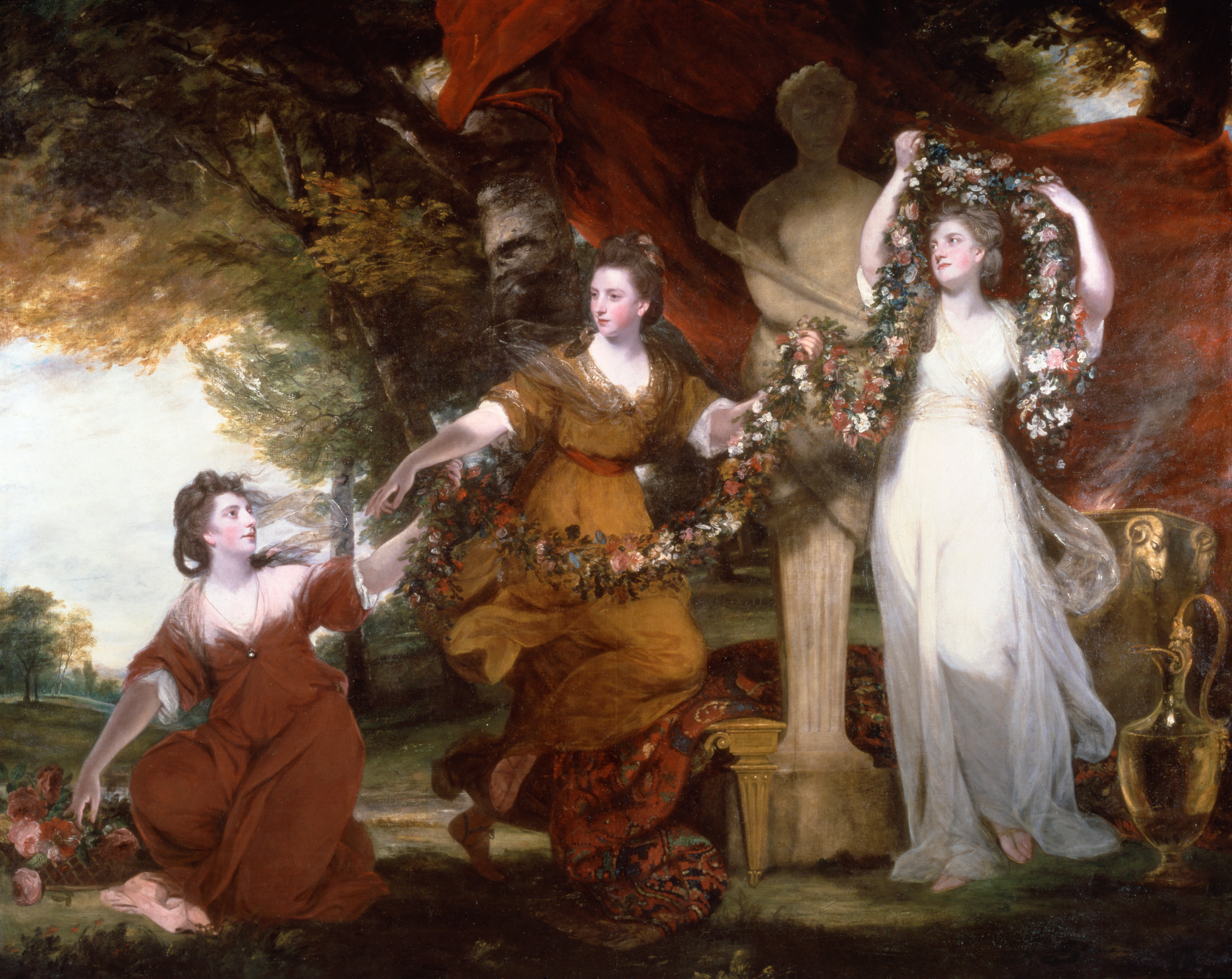
Three Ladies Adorning a Term of Hymen (1773)

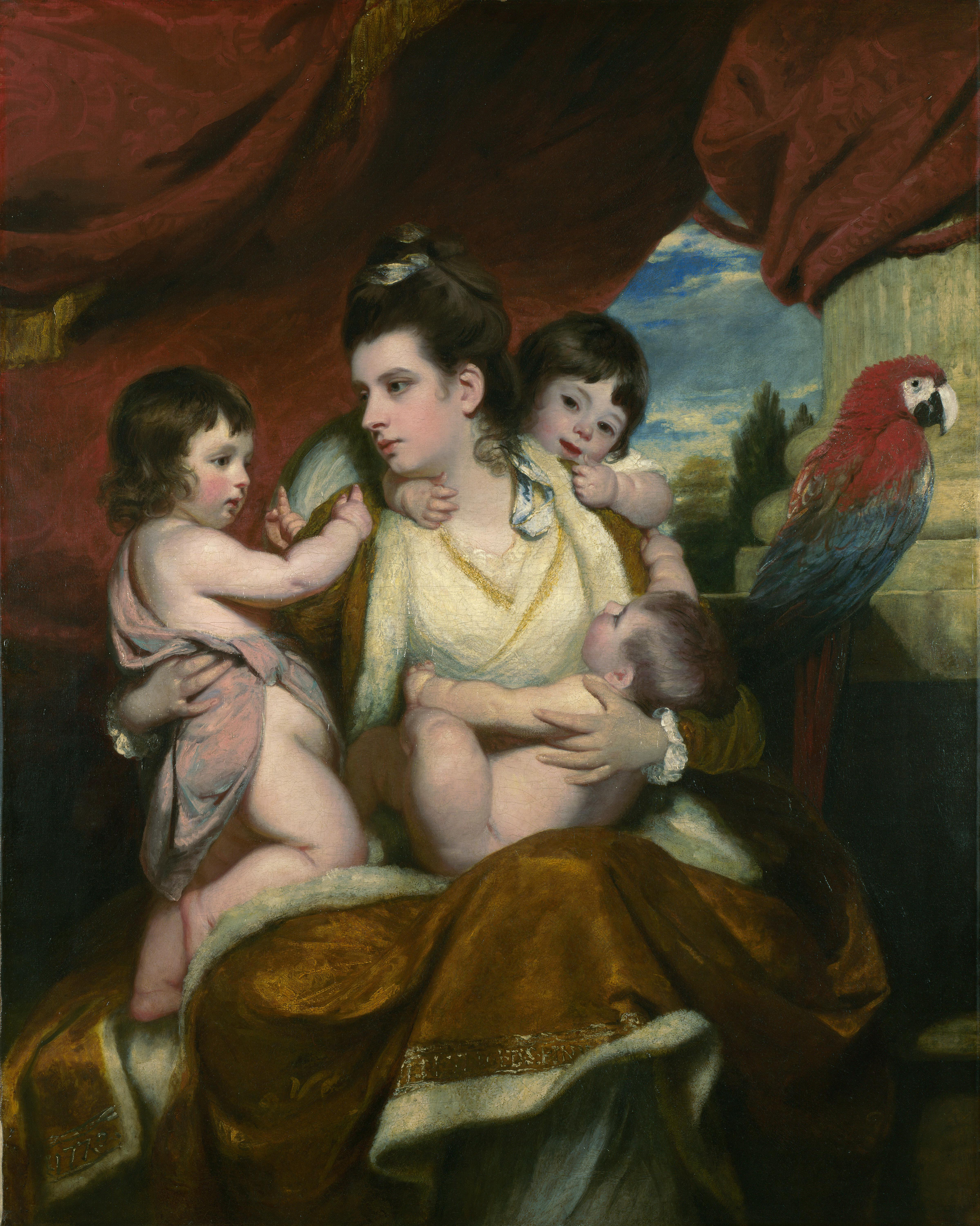
Lady Cockburn and Her Three Eldest Sons (1773–1775)

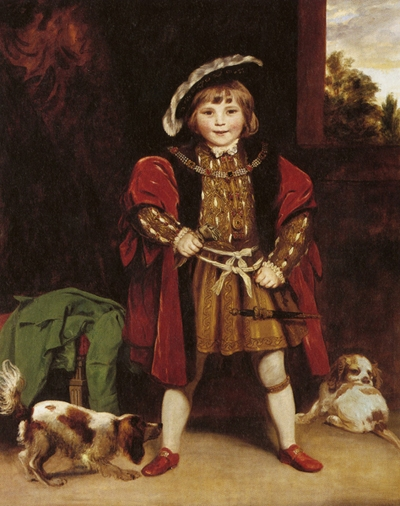
Master Crewe as Henry VIII, (1775)

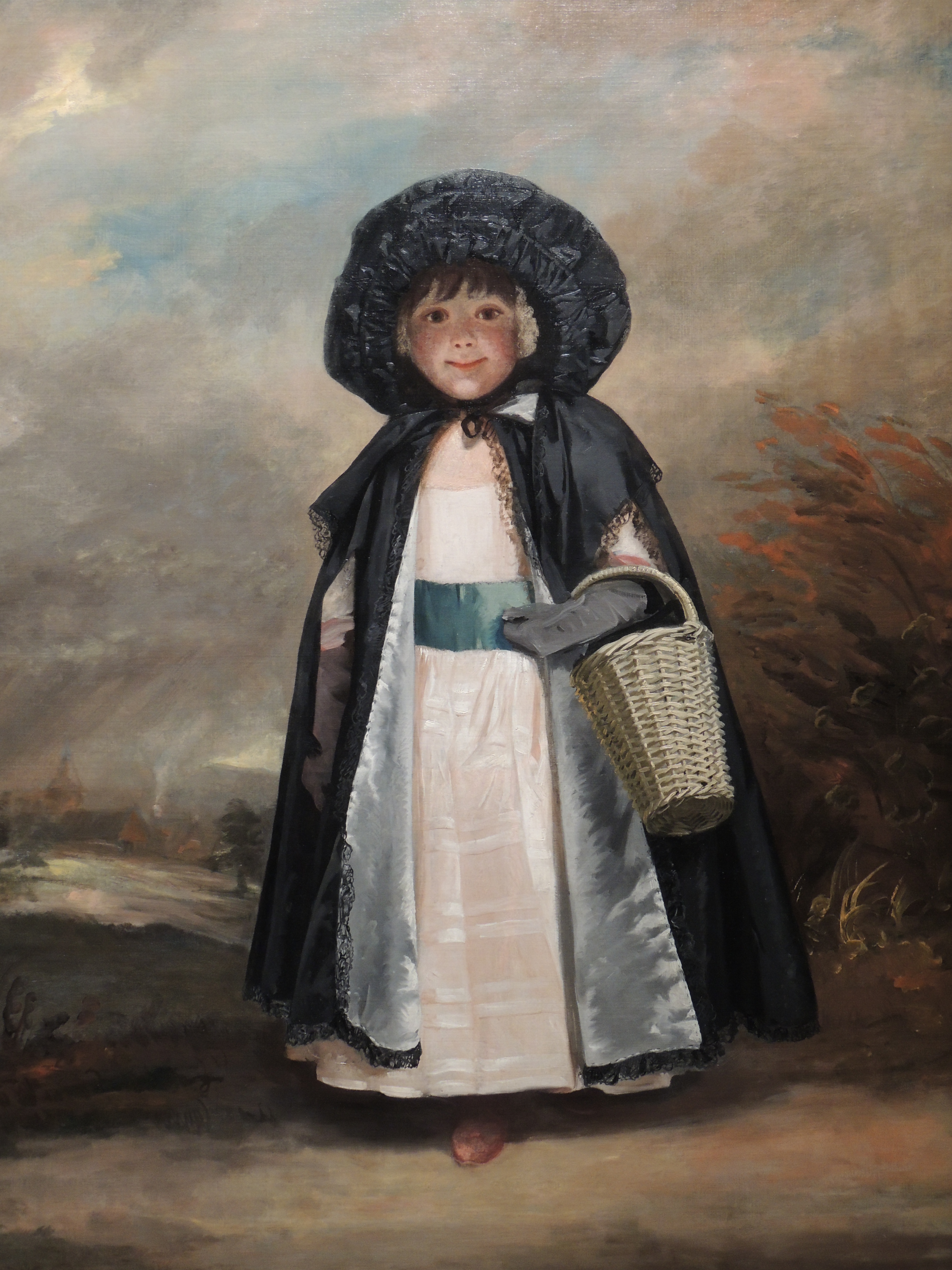
Miss Crewe, c. 1775, Tate Britain

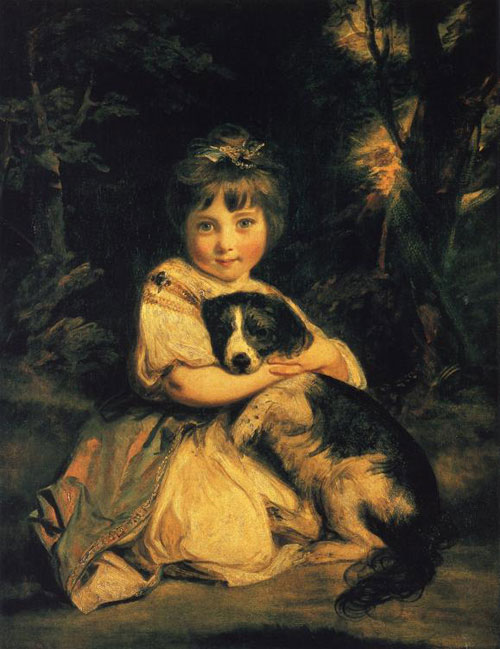
Miss Bowles, Wallace Collection, 1775

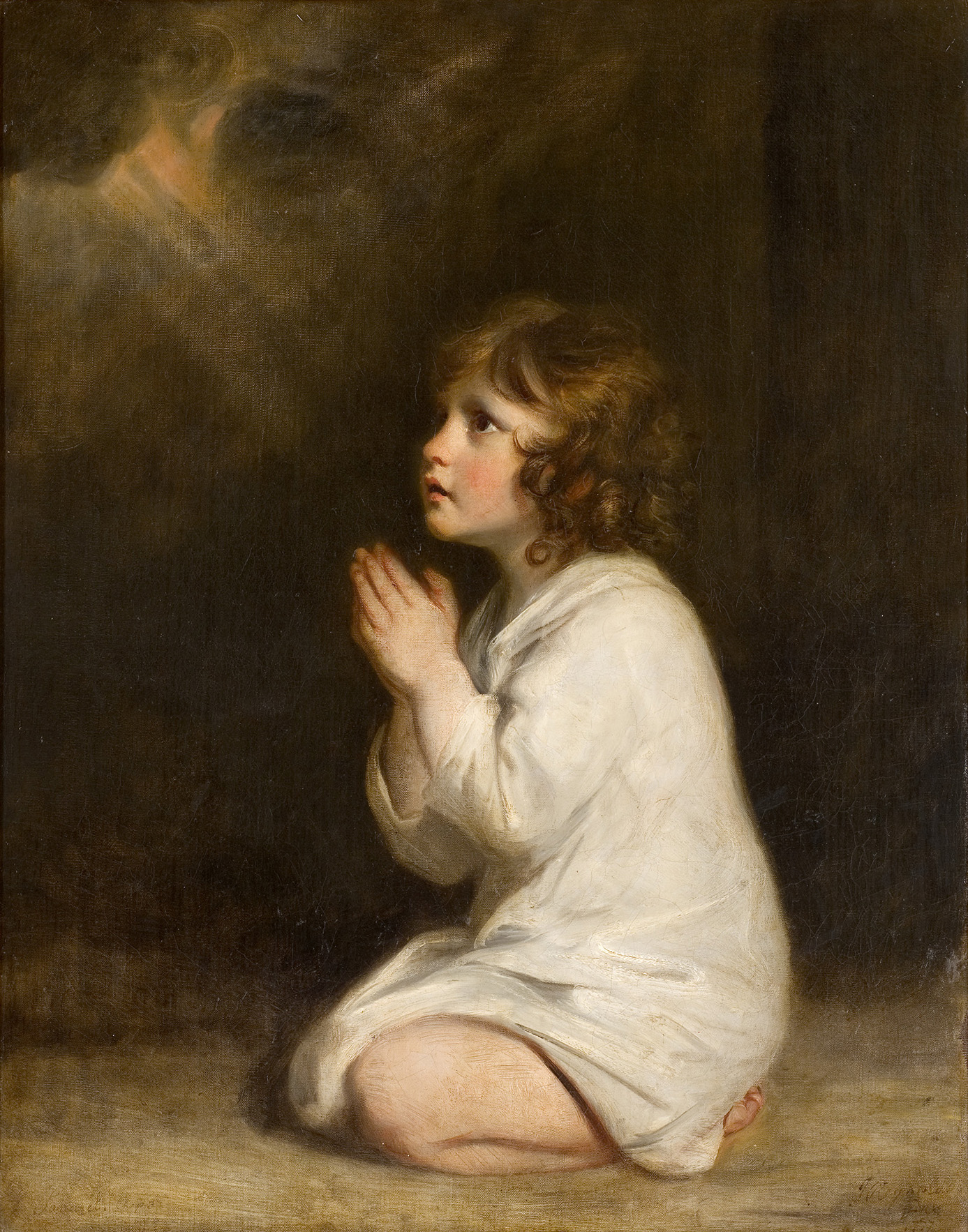
The Infant Samuel (1776)

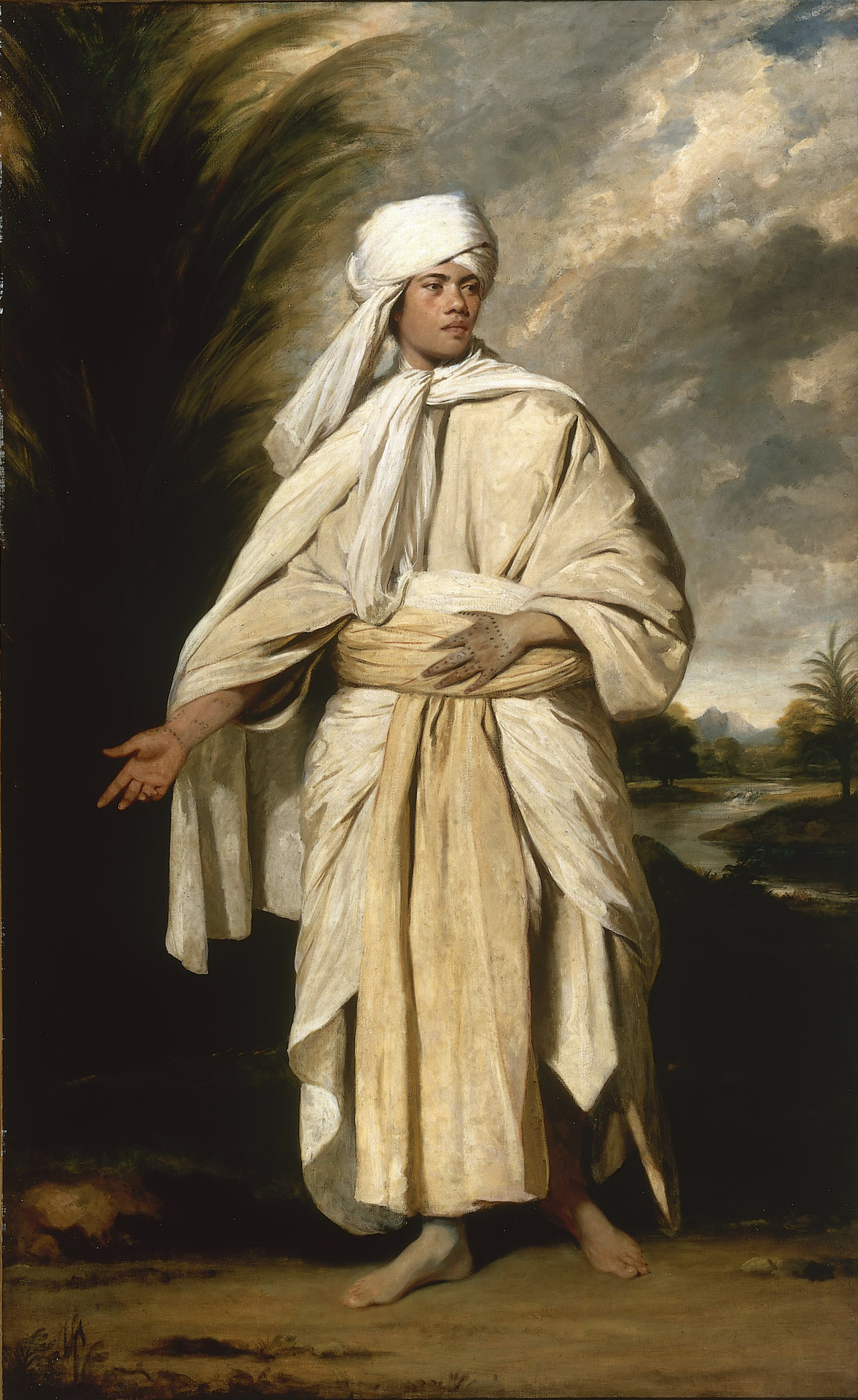
Omai (1776)

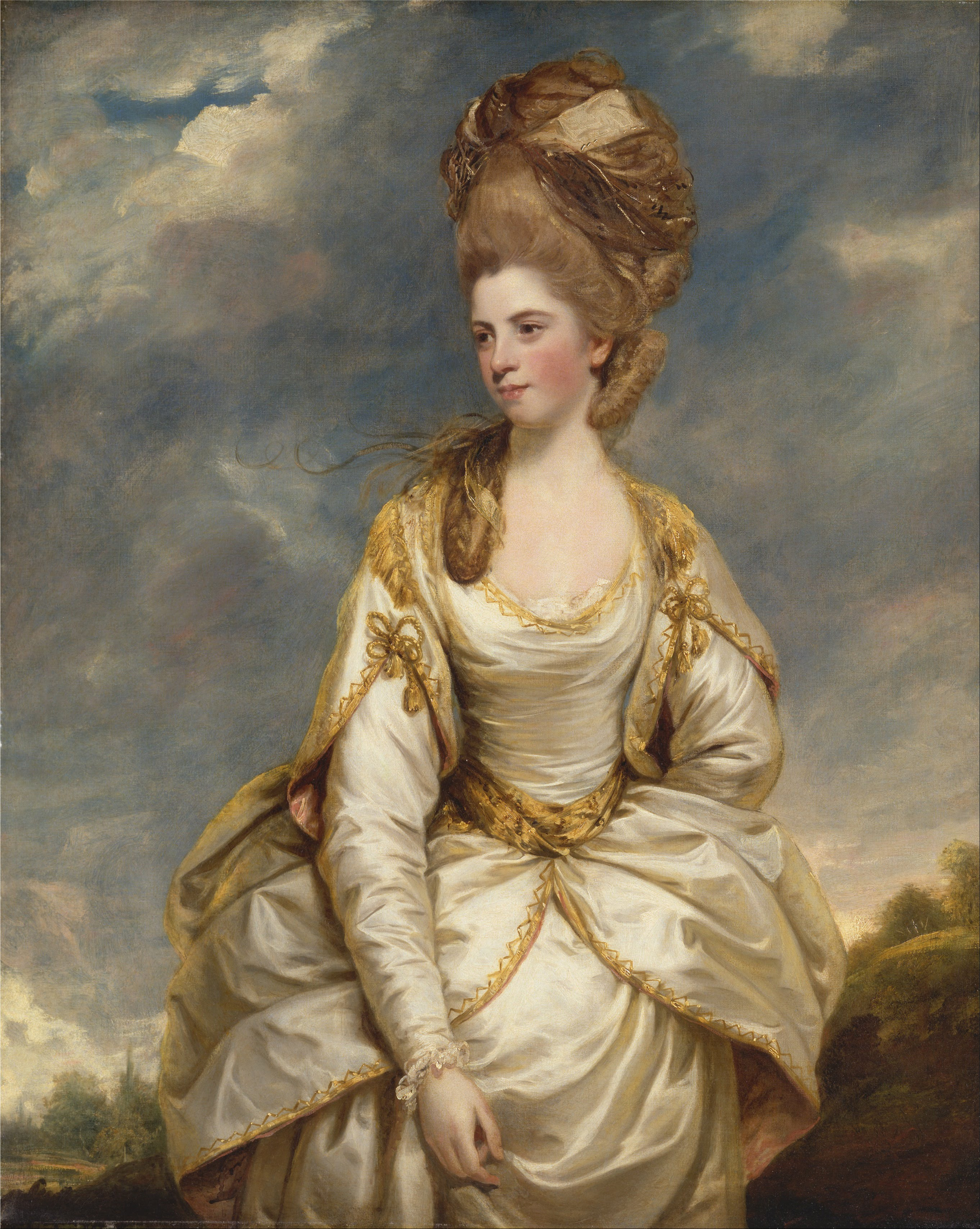
Sarah Campbell (1777)

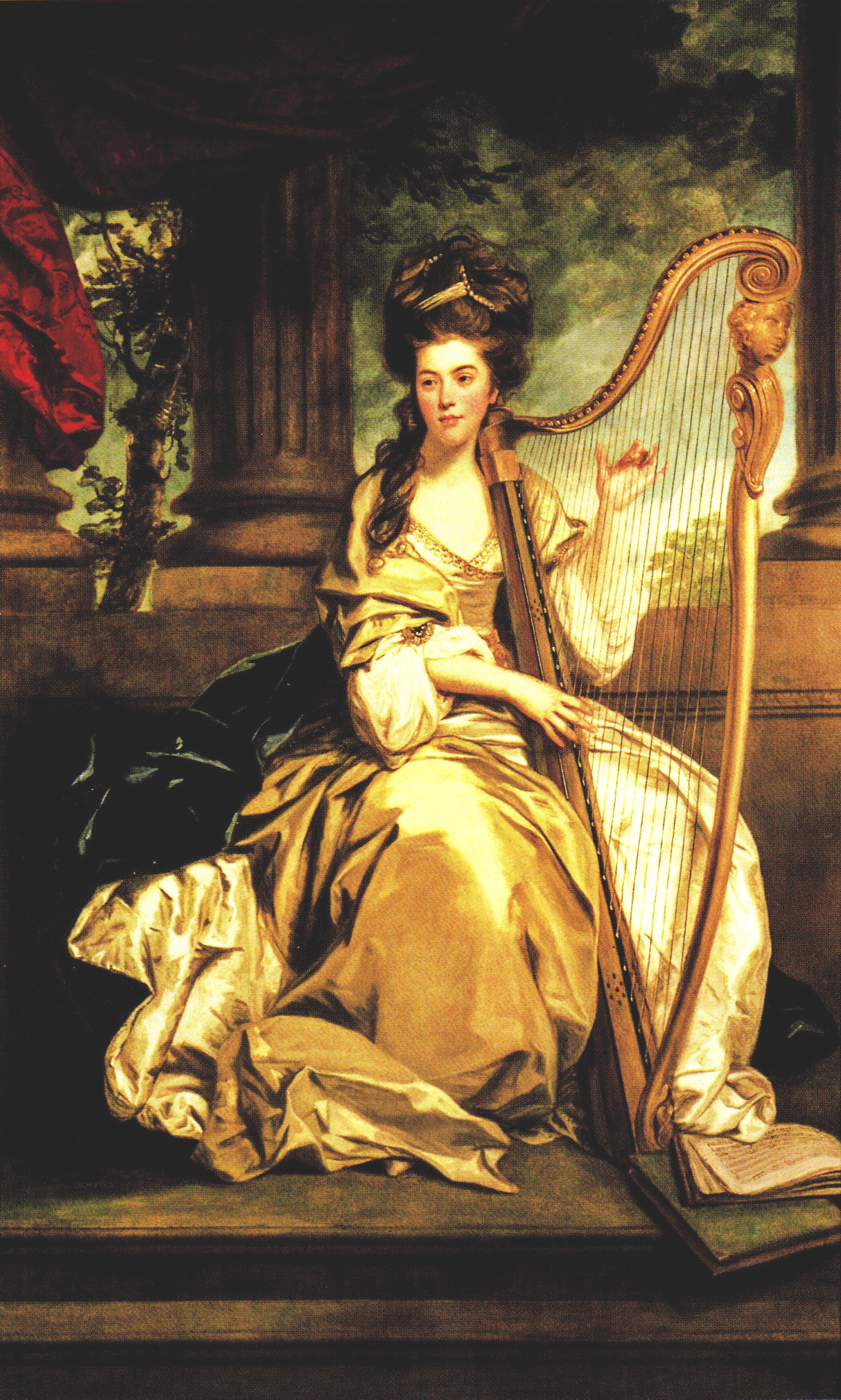
Countess of Eglinton (1777)

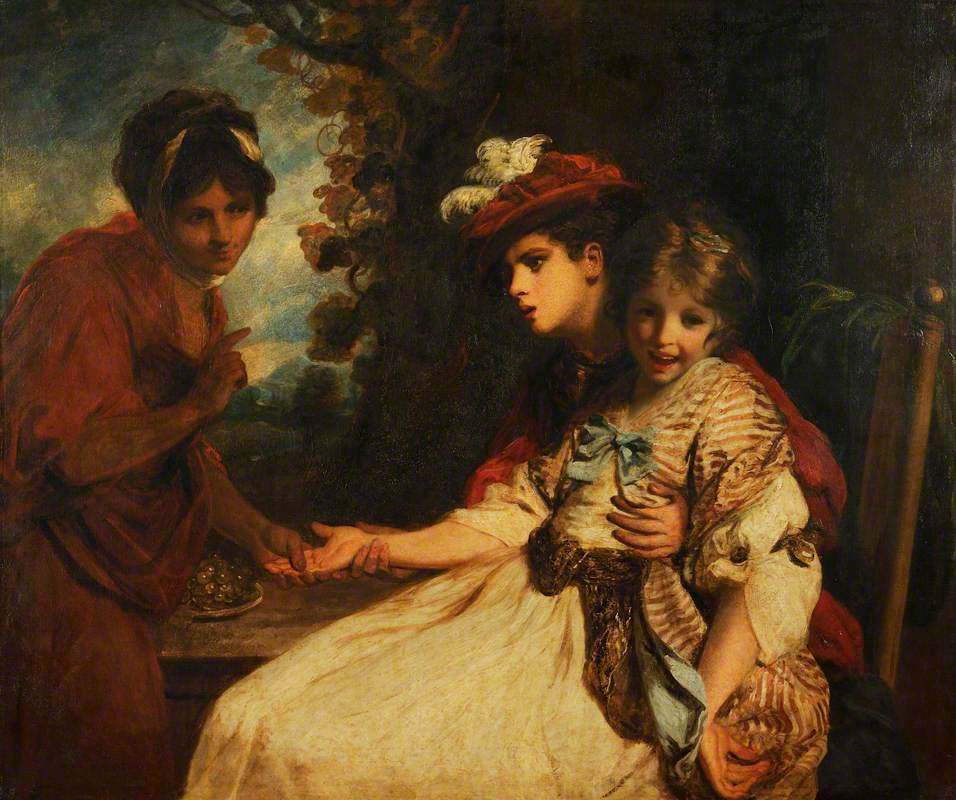
A Fortune-Teller, 1777

Lady Caroline Howard (1778)

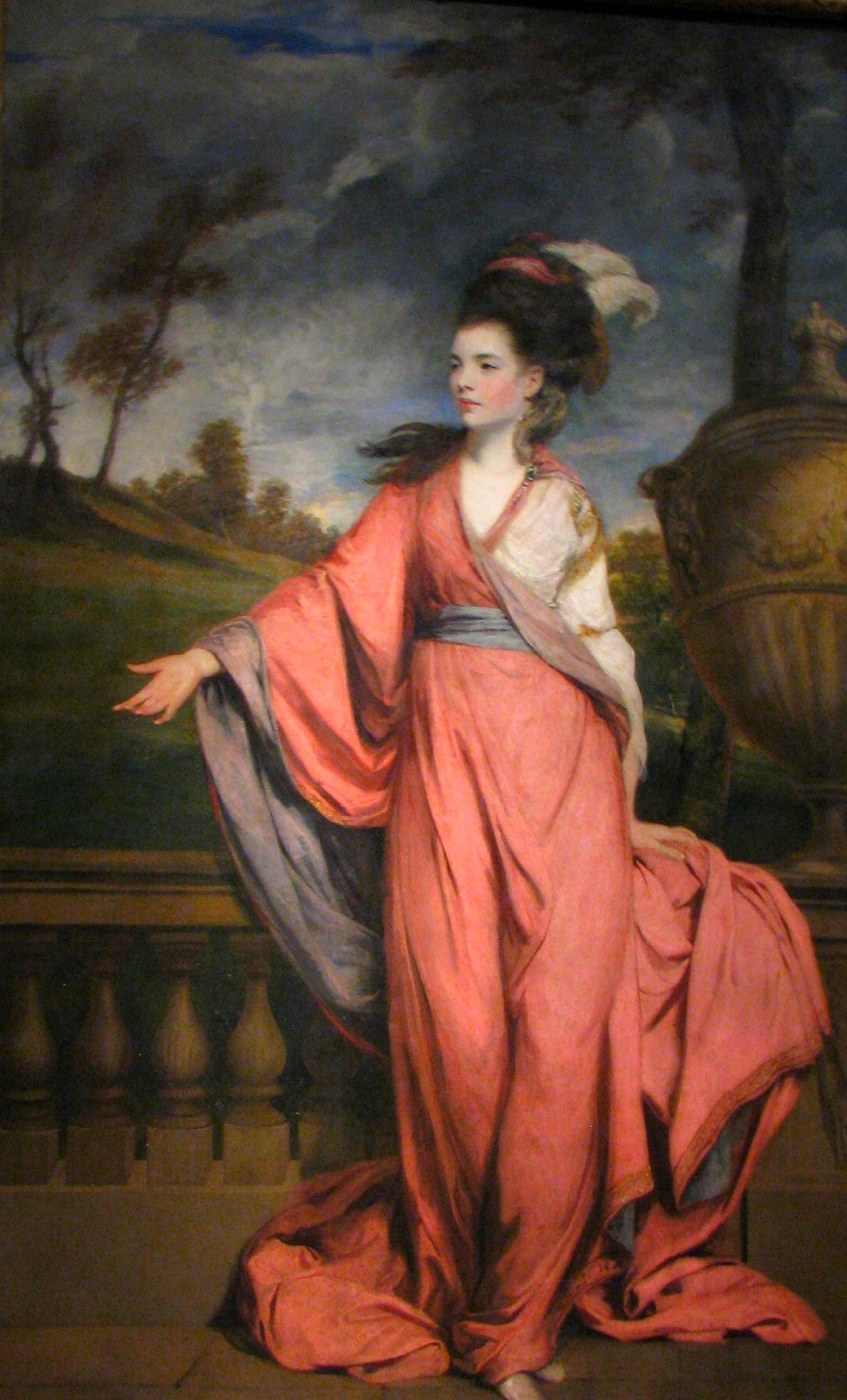
Jane, Countess of Harrington (1778)

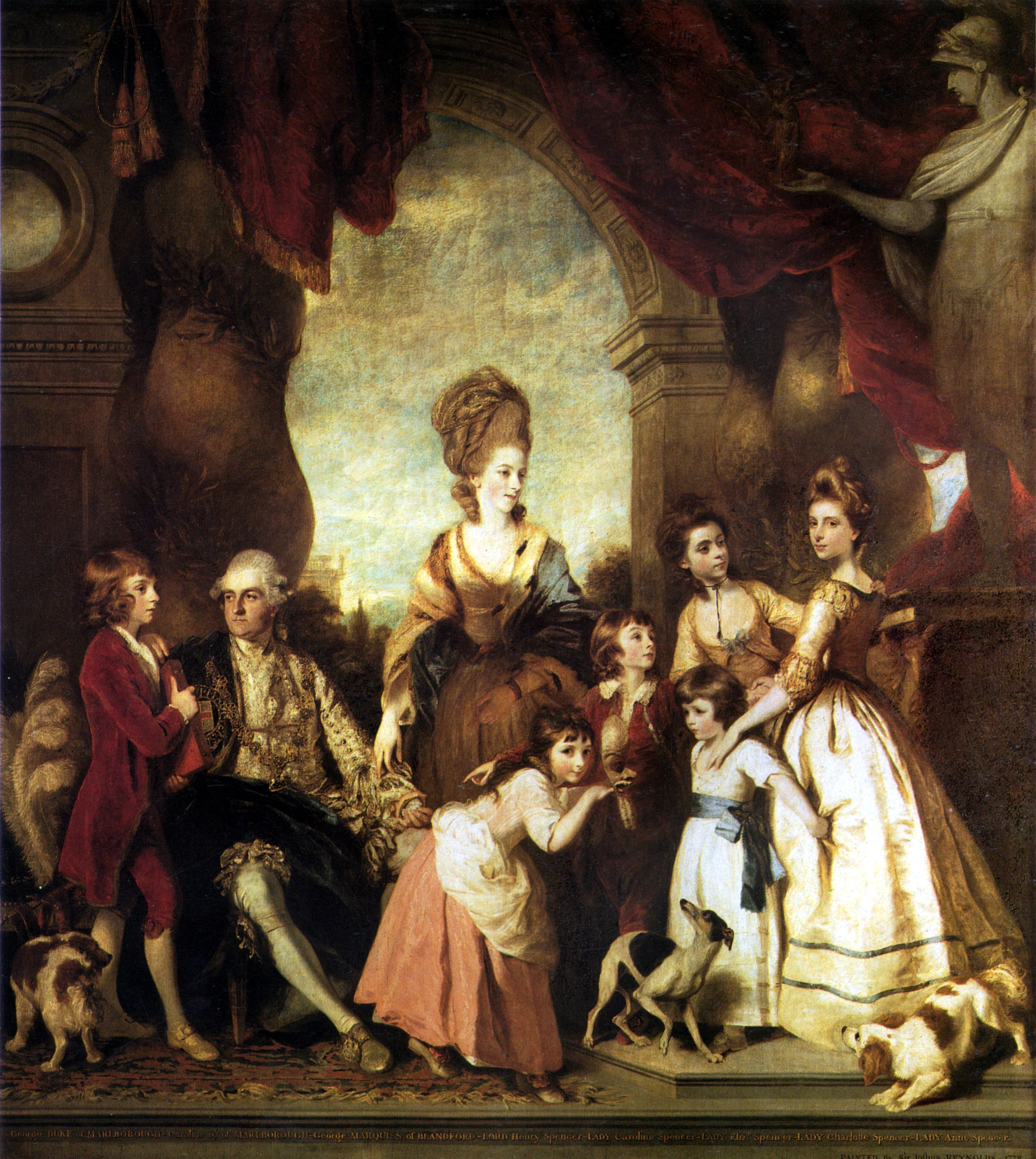
The Marlborough Family (1778)

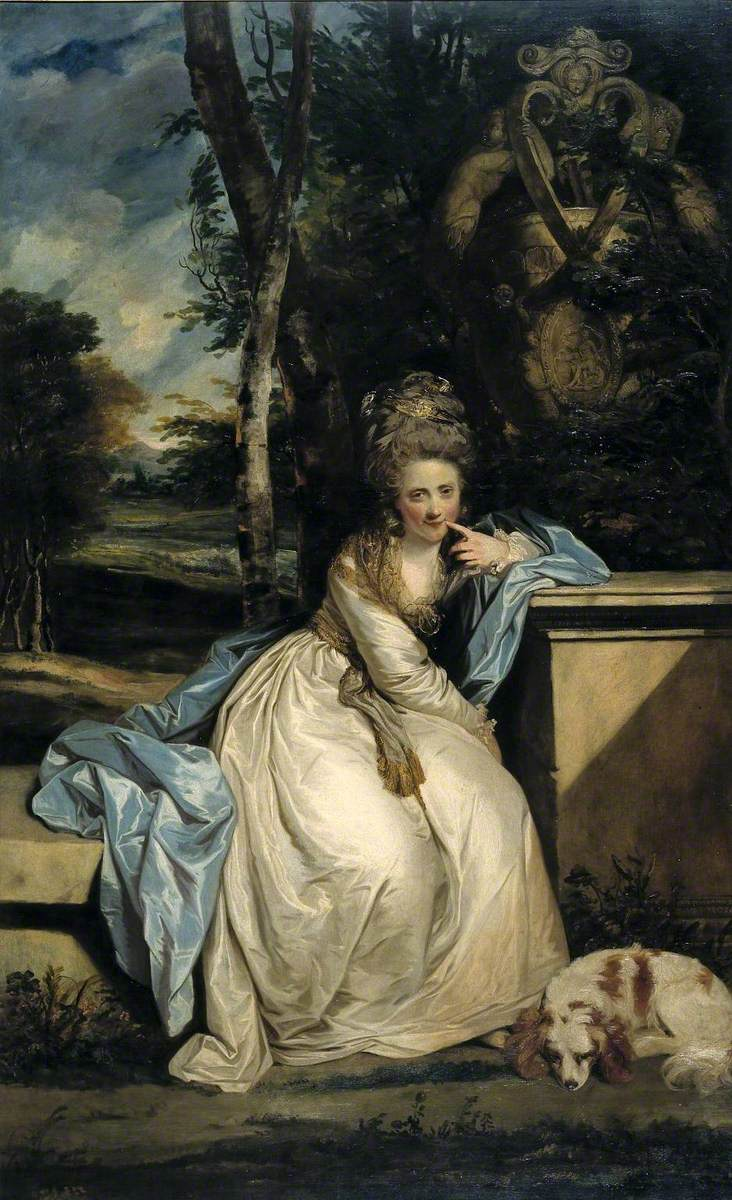
Portrait of Mary Monckton (1778)

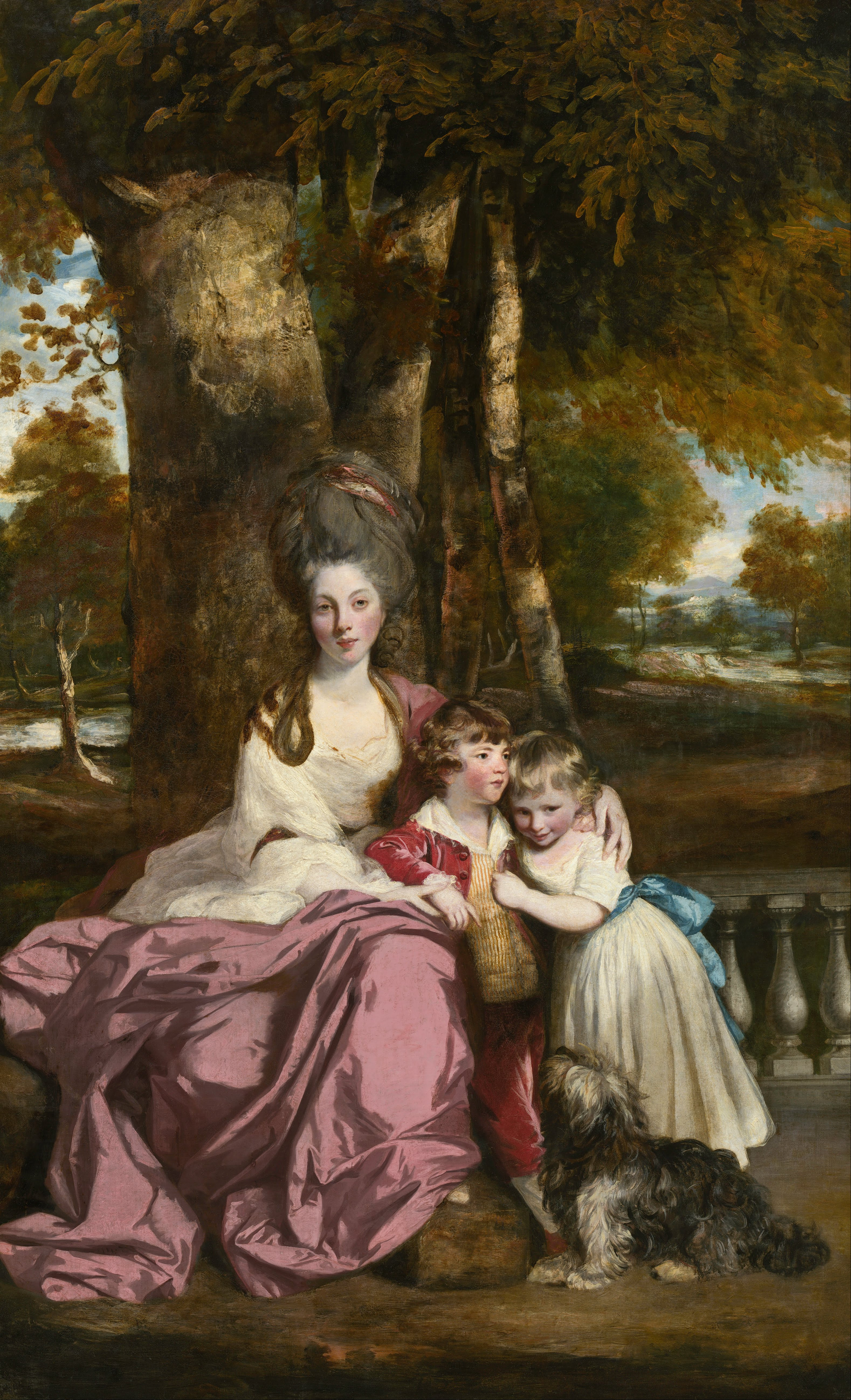
Lady Elizabeth Delmé and Her Children (1779)

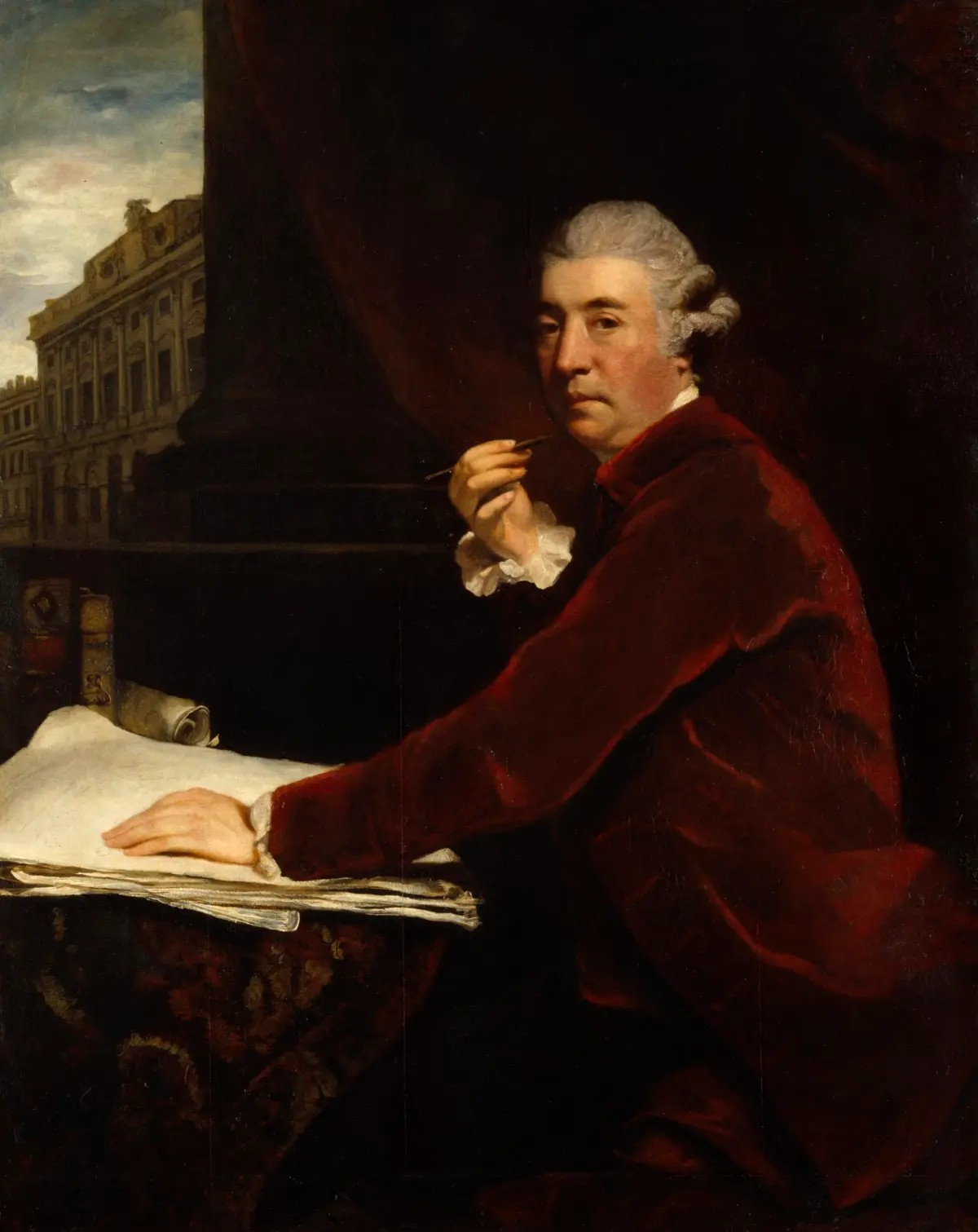
Portrait of Sir William Chambers (1780)

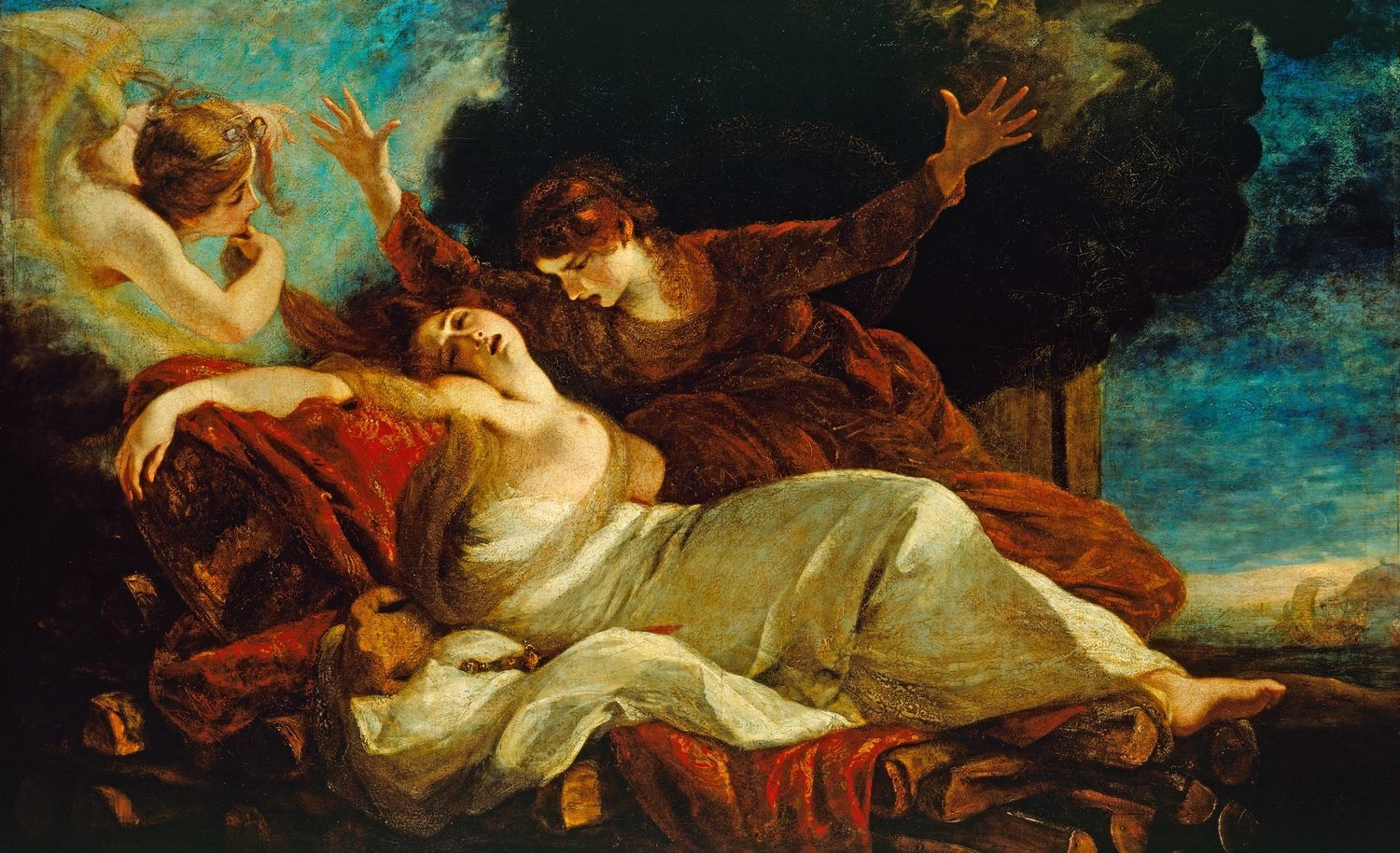
The Death of Dido (1781)

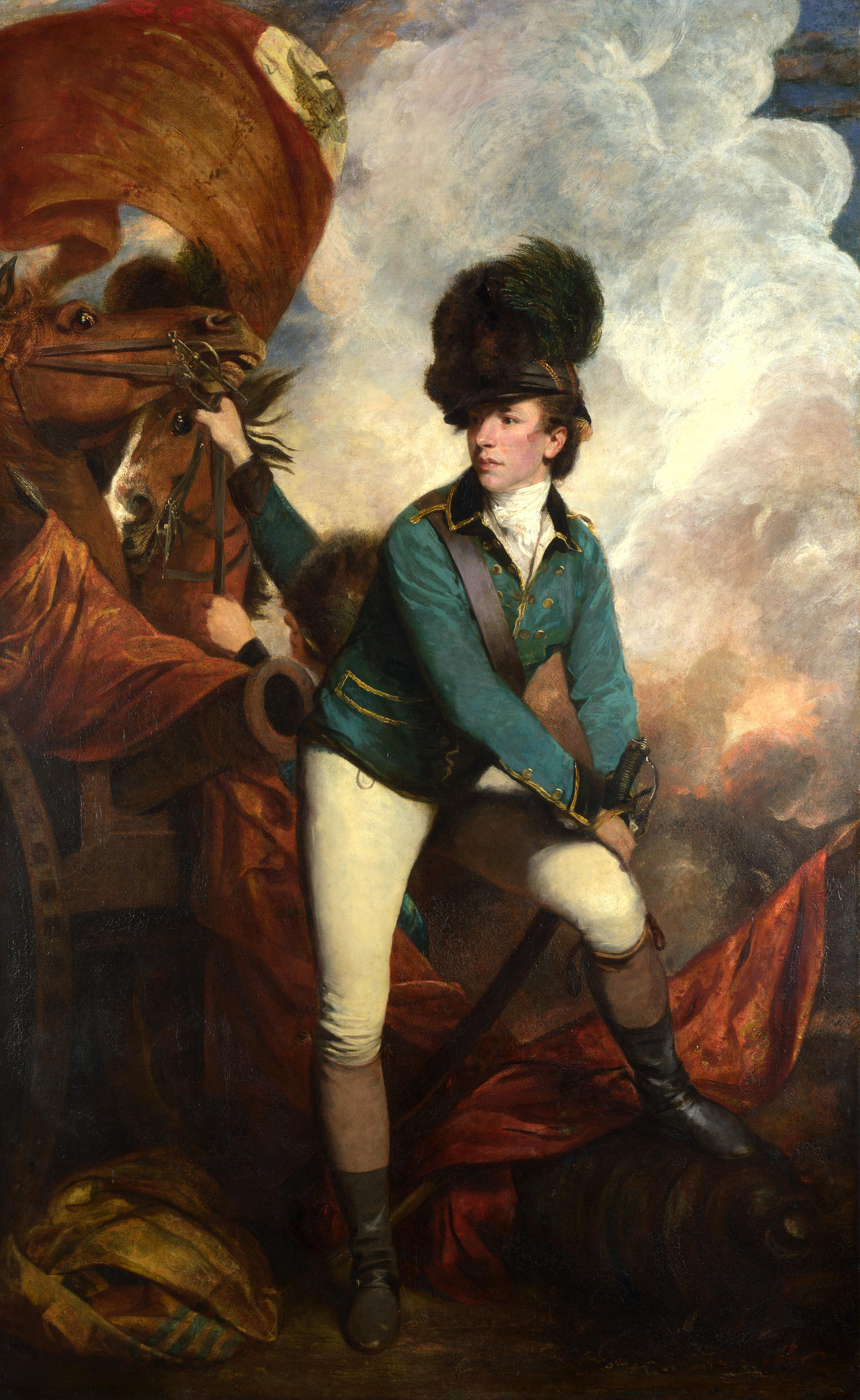
Portrait of Banastre Tarleton, (1782), National Gallery

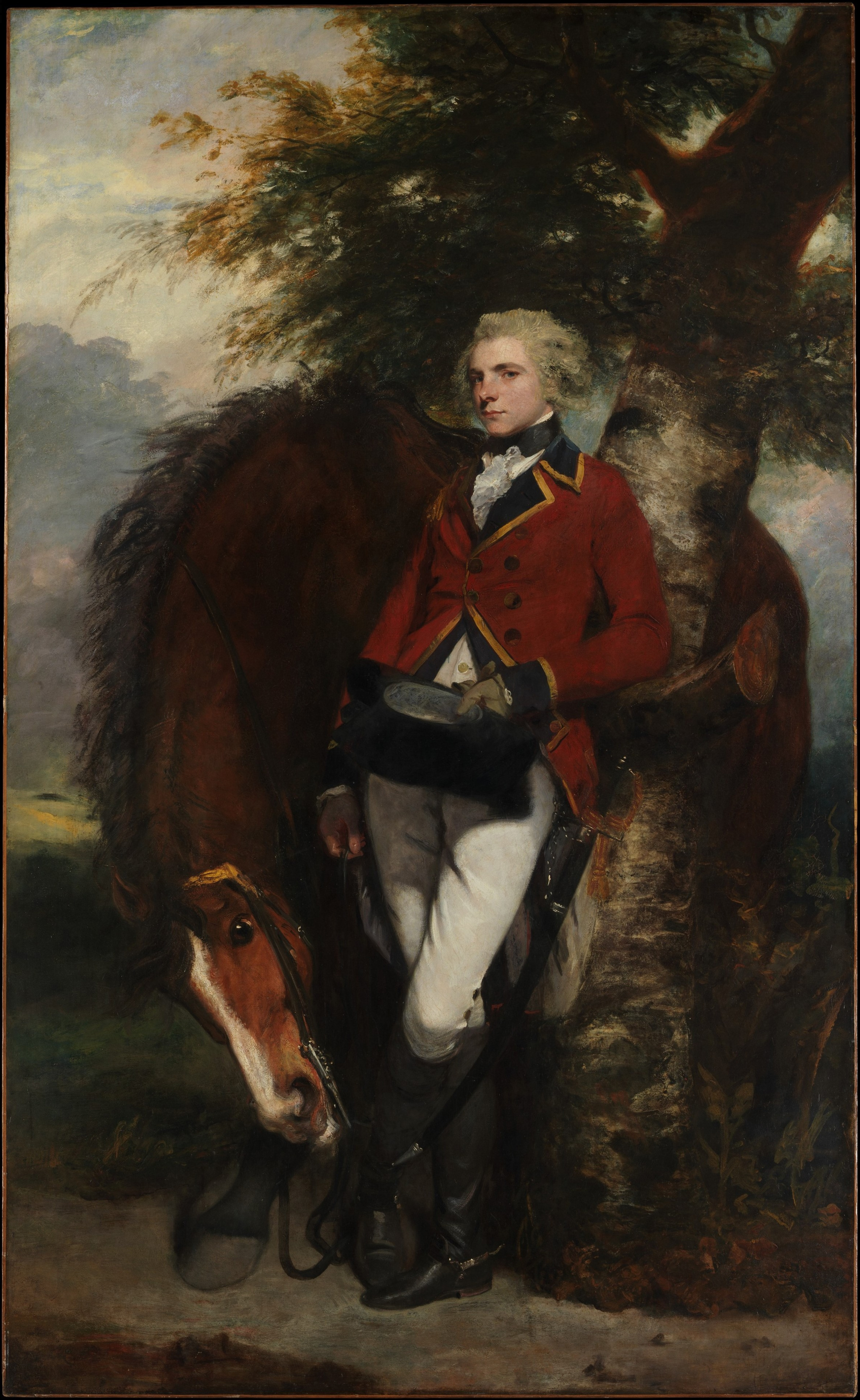
Captain George K. H. Coussmaker (1782)

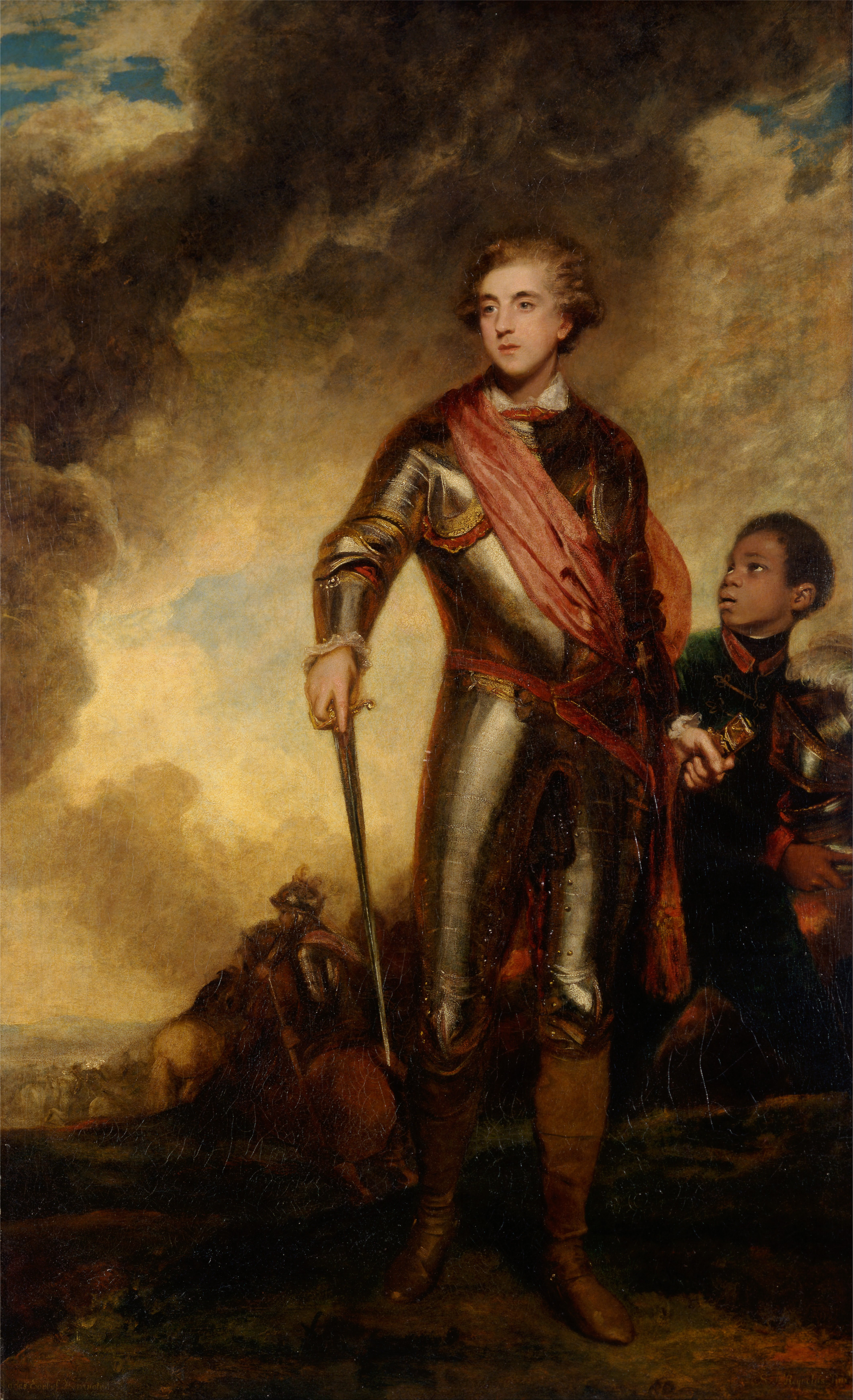
Charles Stanhope, 3rd Earl of Harrington (1782)

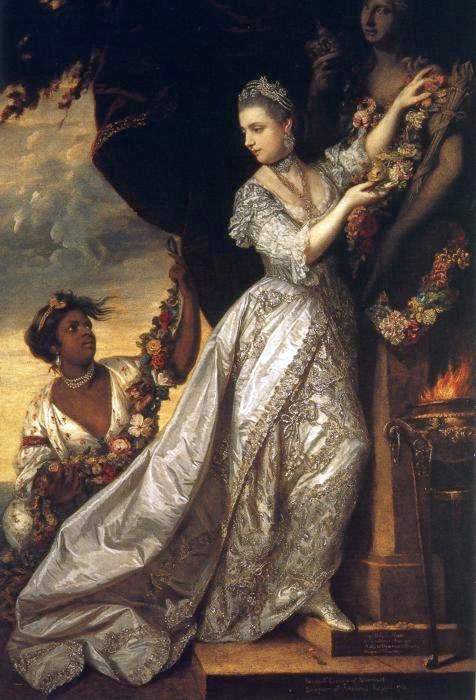
Lady Elizabeth Keppel (1761)

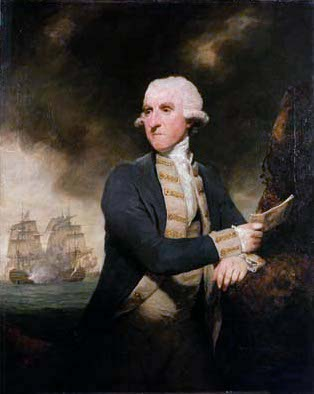
Admiral Hood (1783)

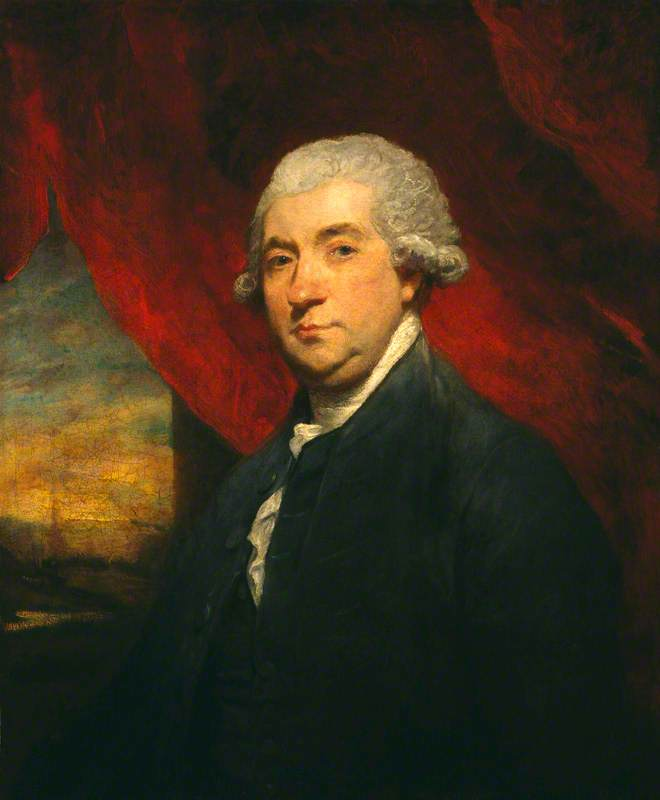
Portrait of James Boswell (1787)

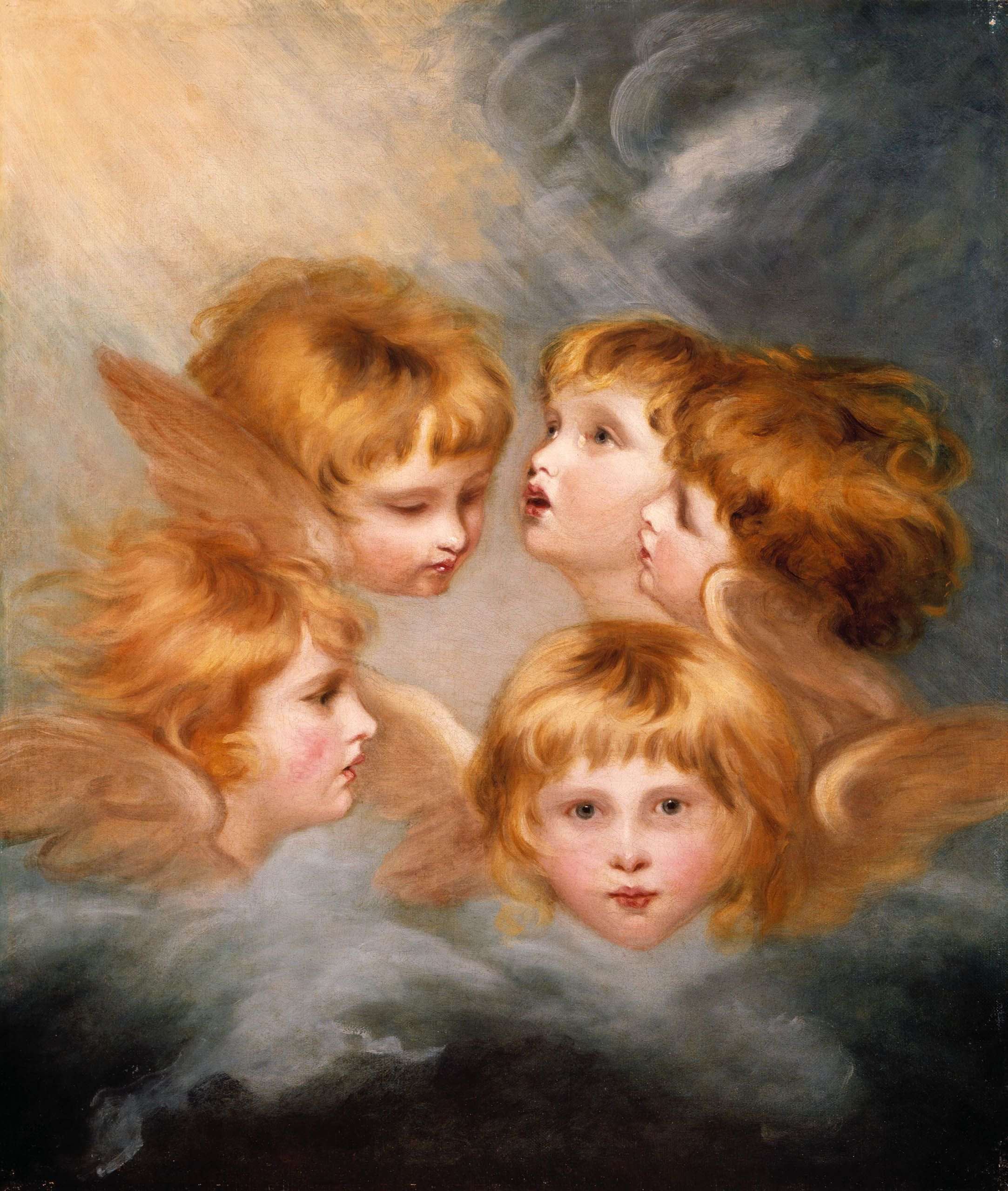
Heads of Angels – Miss Frances (Gordon), (1787)

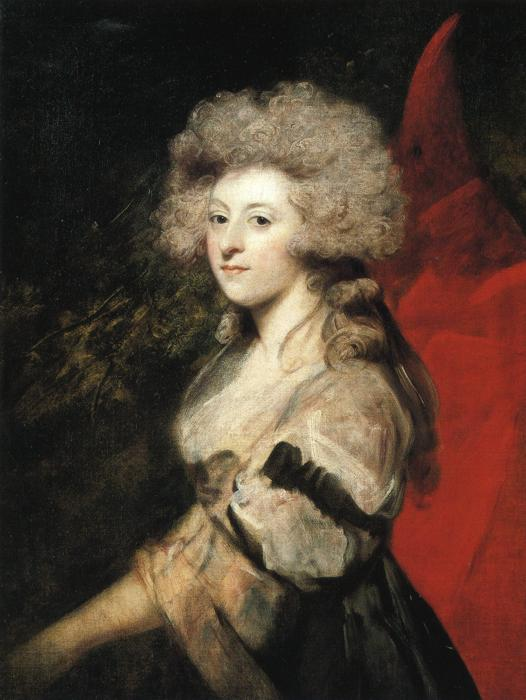
Portrait of Maria Fitzherbert, (1788)

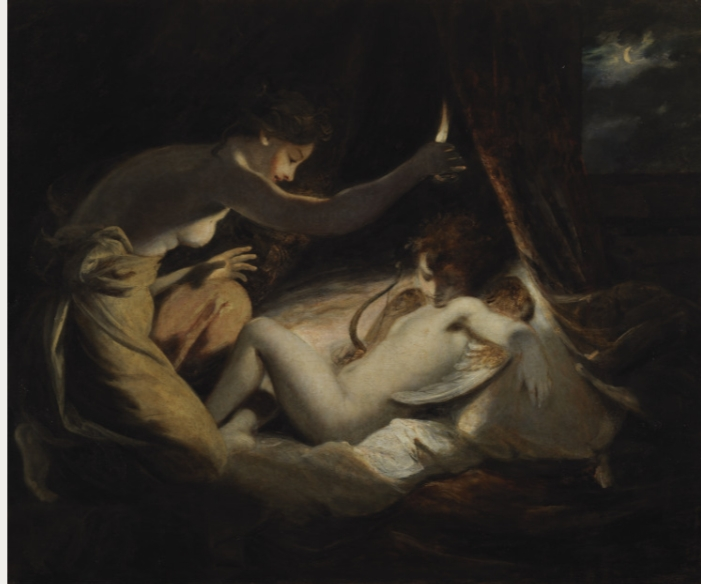
Cupid and Psyche, (1789)

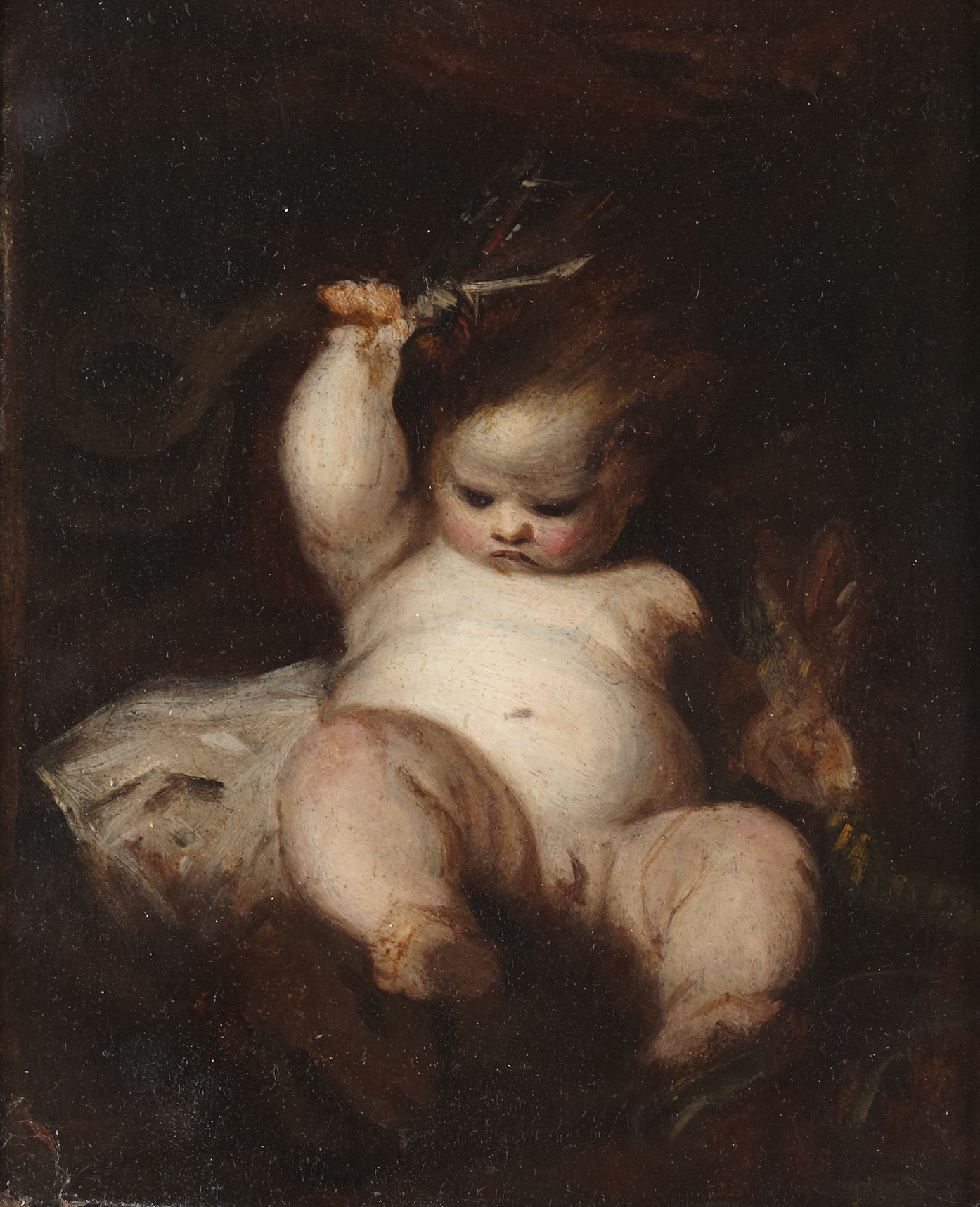
The Infant Hercules (c. 1785–1789), Princeton University Art Museum

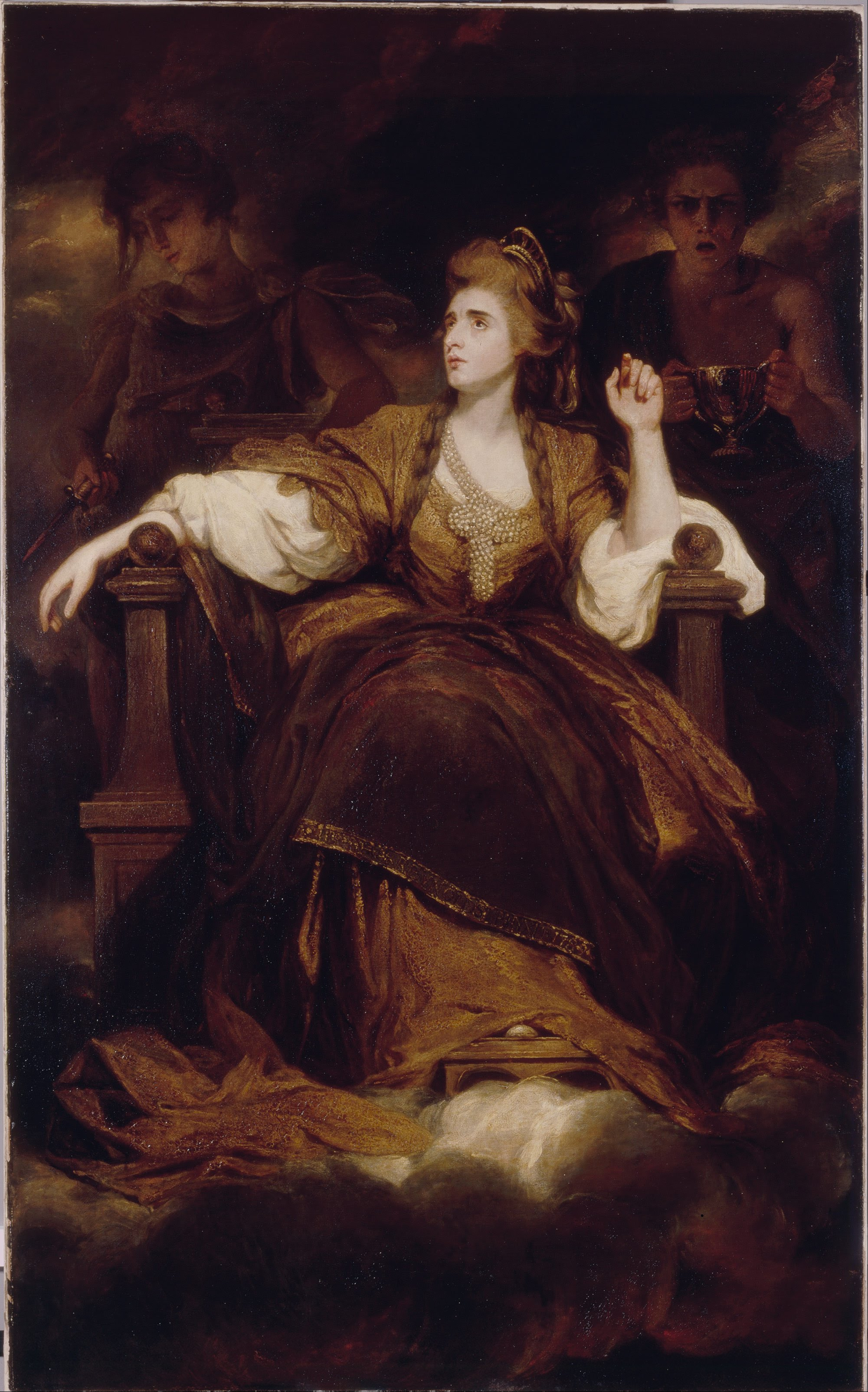
Sarah Siddons as the Tragic Muse (1789), The Huntington Library, San Marino, California

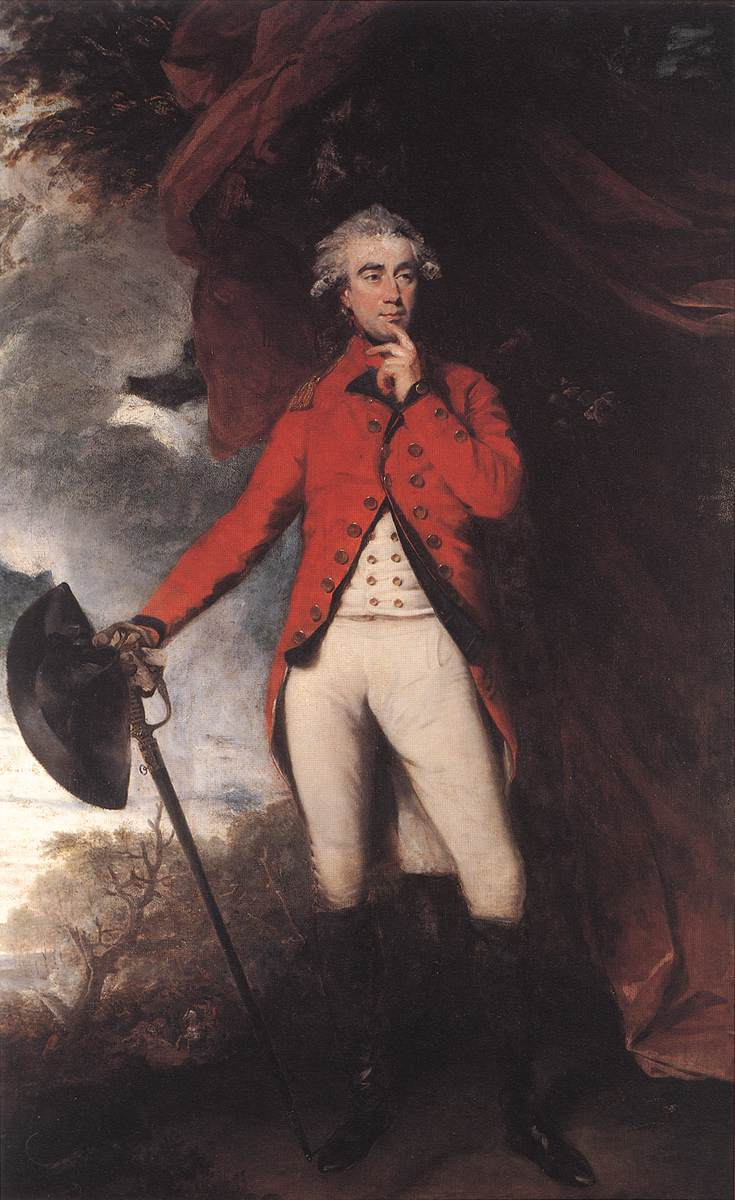
Portrait of Lord Moira (1790)

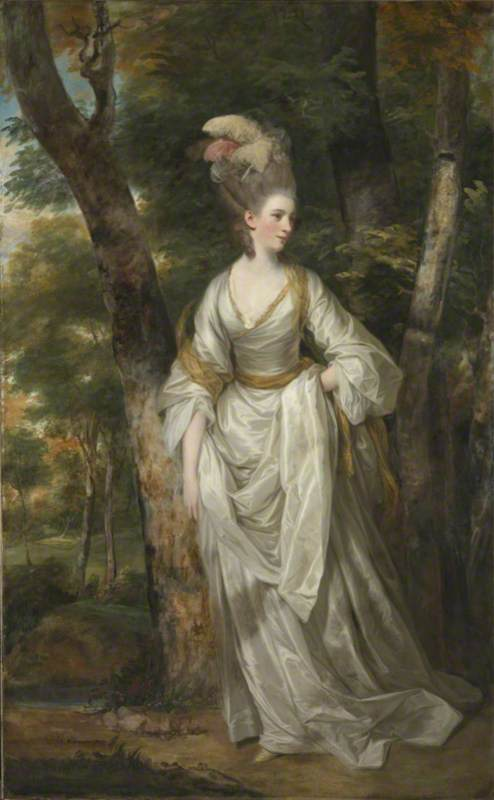
Mrs Elizabeth Carnac (1775)

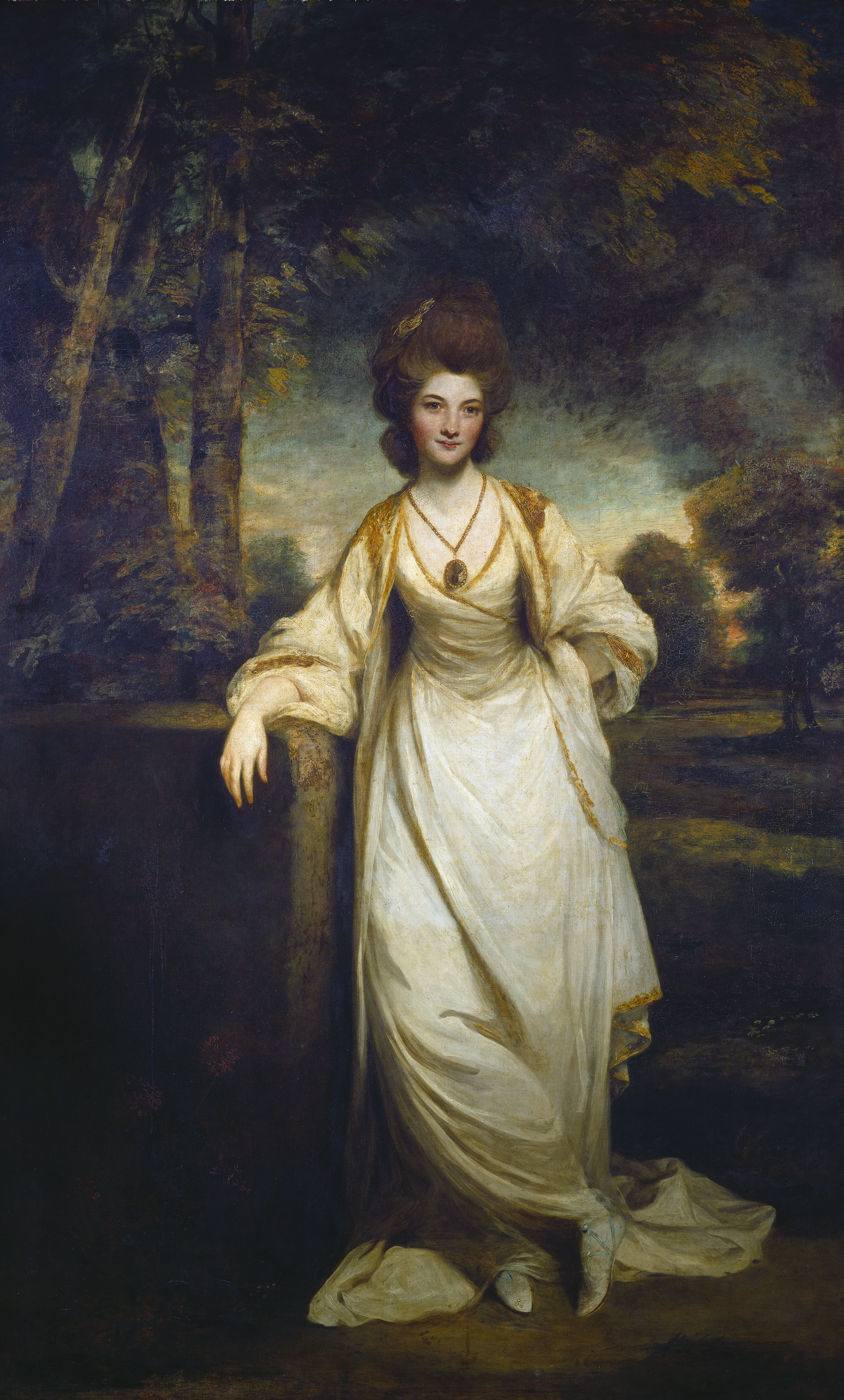
Lady Elizabeth Compton, Countess of Burlington (1780-1782)

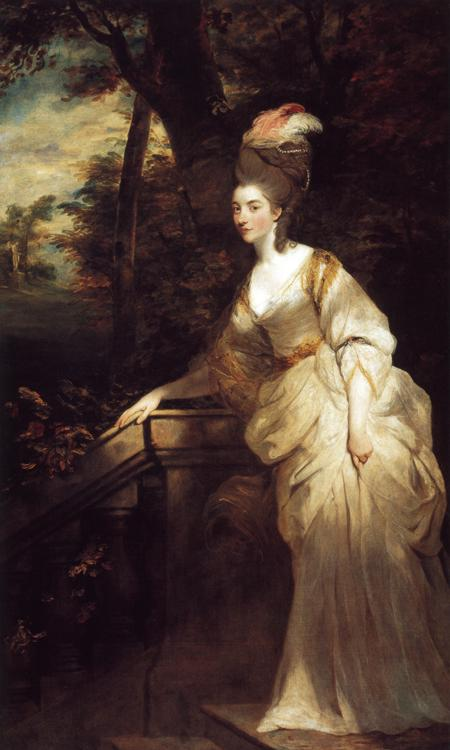
Georgiana, Duchess of Devonshire (c.1775)

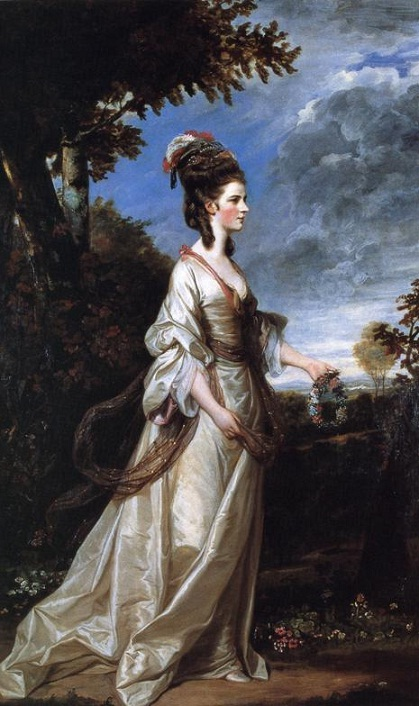
Jane Fleming, Countess of Harrington (c.1775)

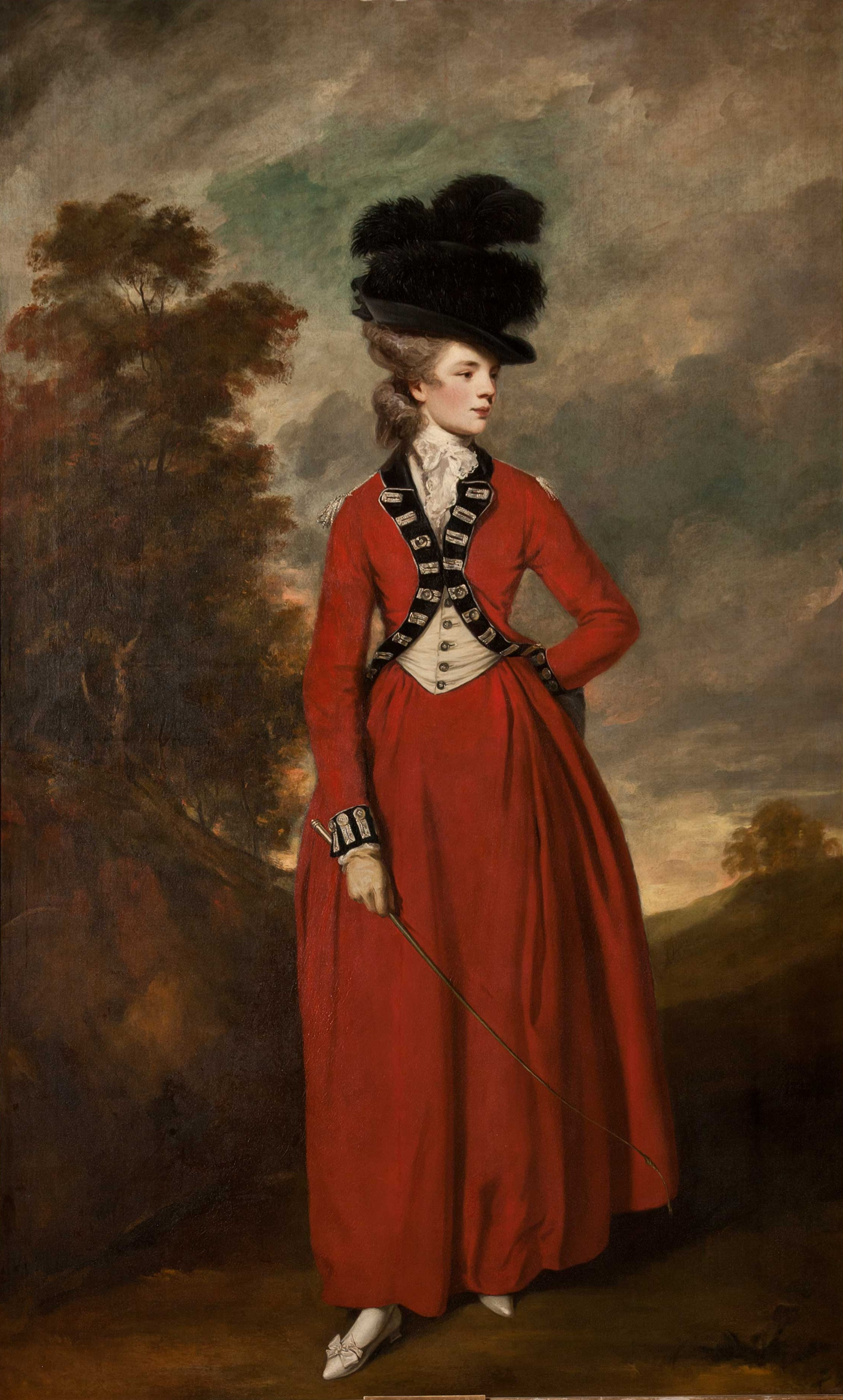
Portrait of Lady Worsley (1779)

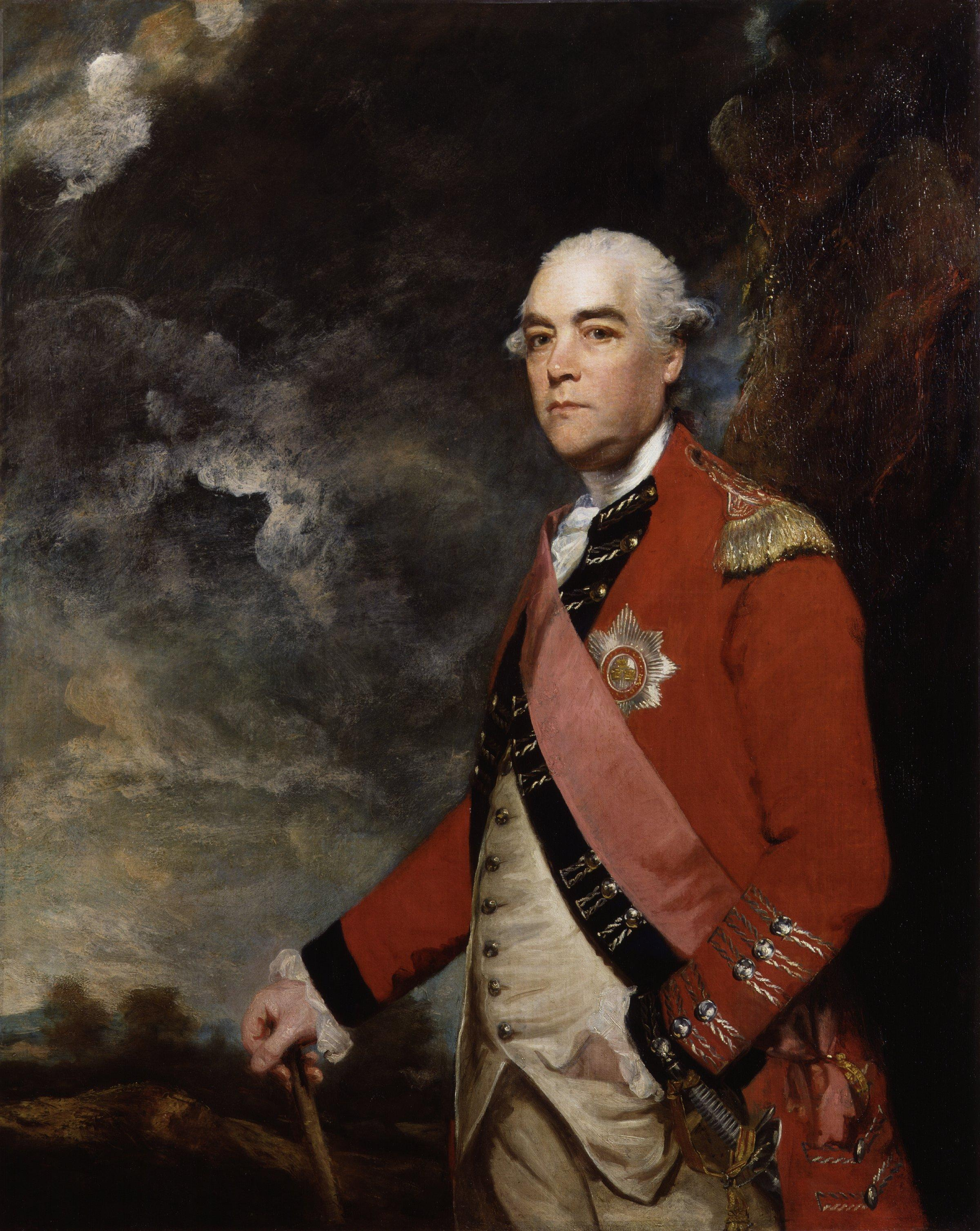
Sir William Fawcett (1784)

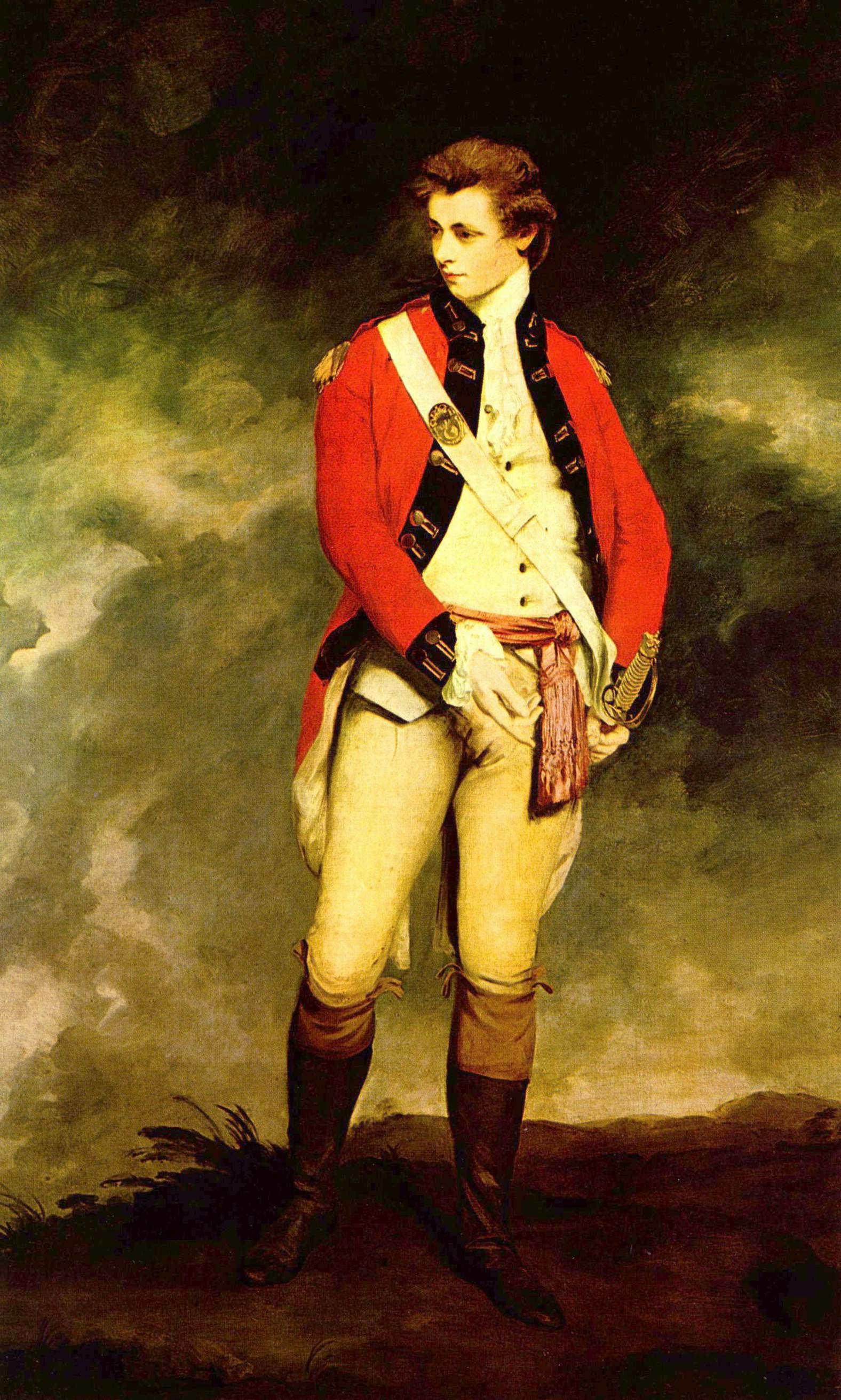
John Hayes St. Leger

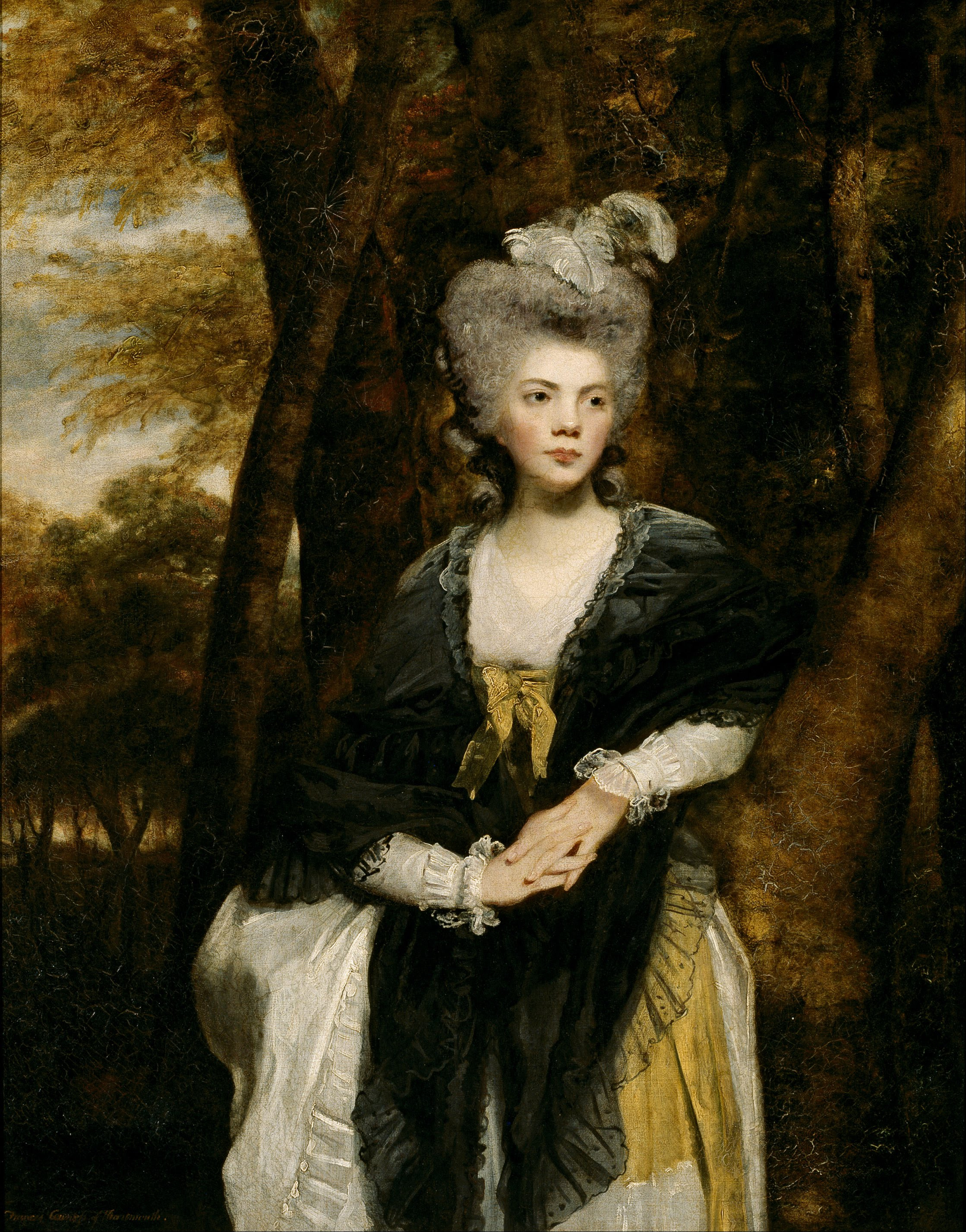
Lady Frances Finch, Countess of Dartmouth (c.1781-1782)

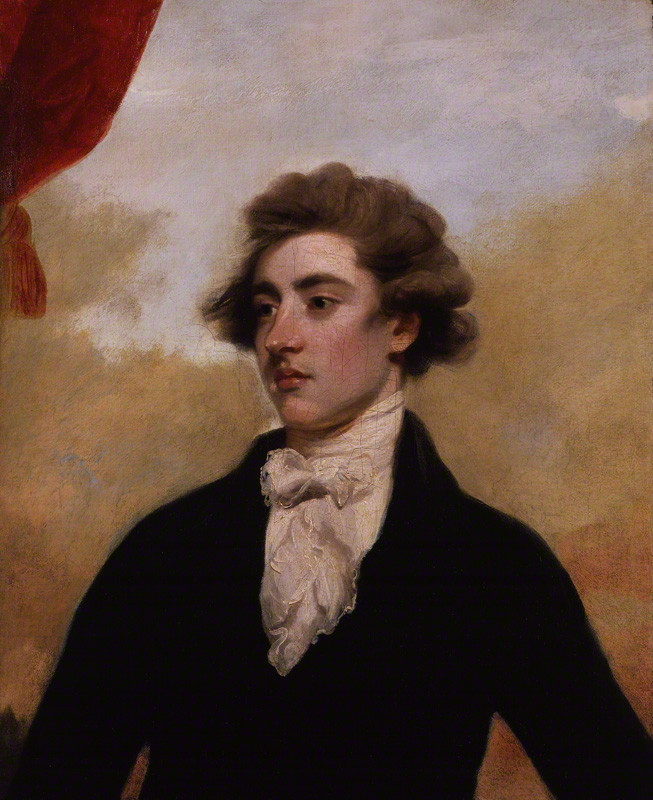
Portrait of William Beckford, (1782)

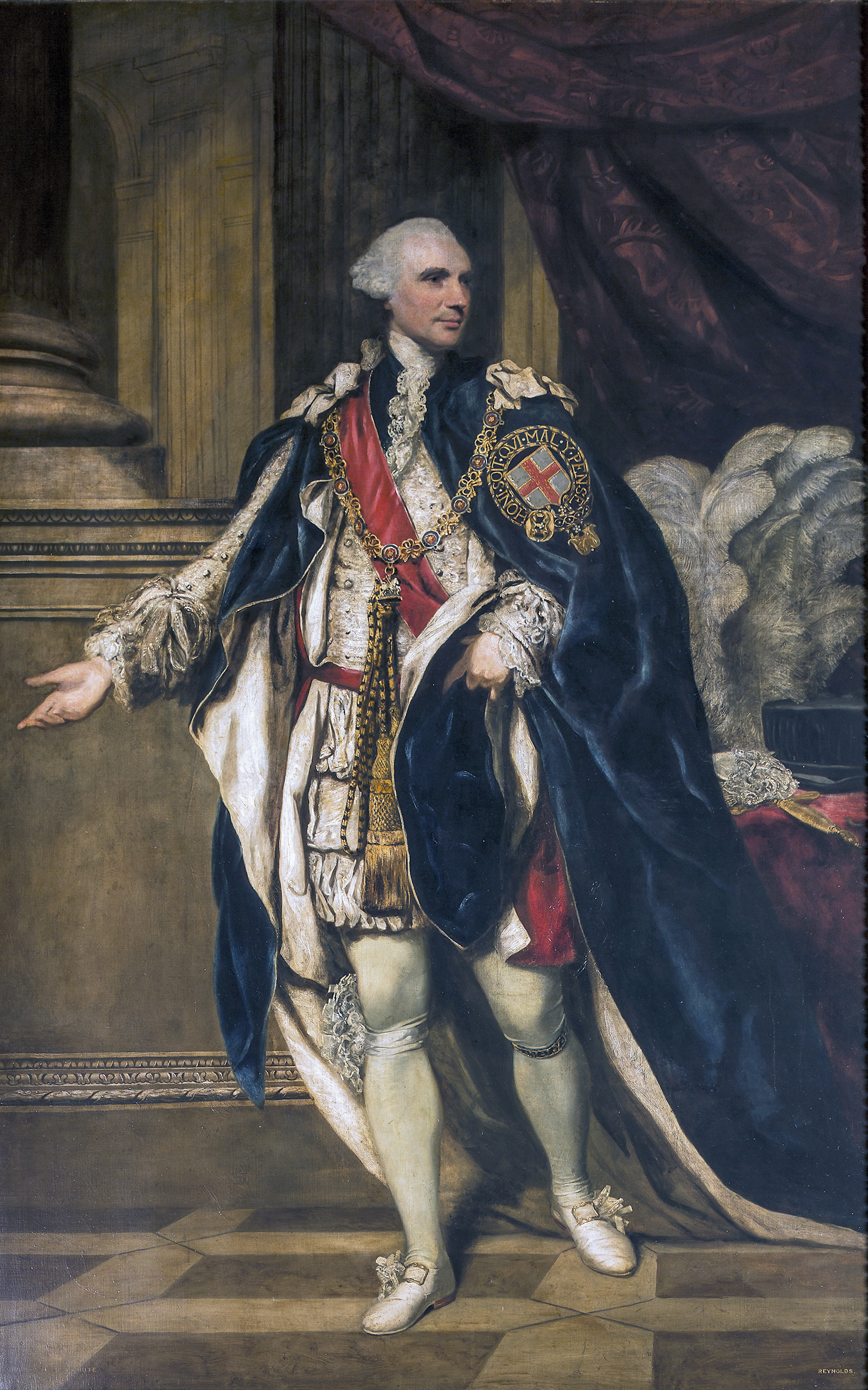
Portrait of the Earl of Bute (1773)

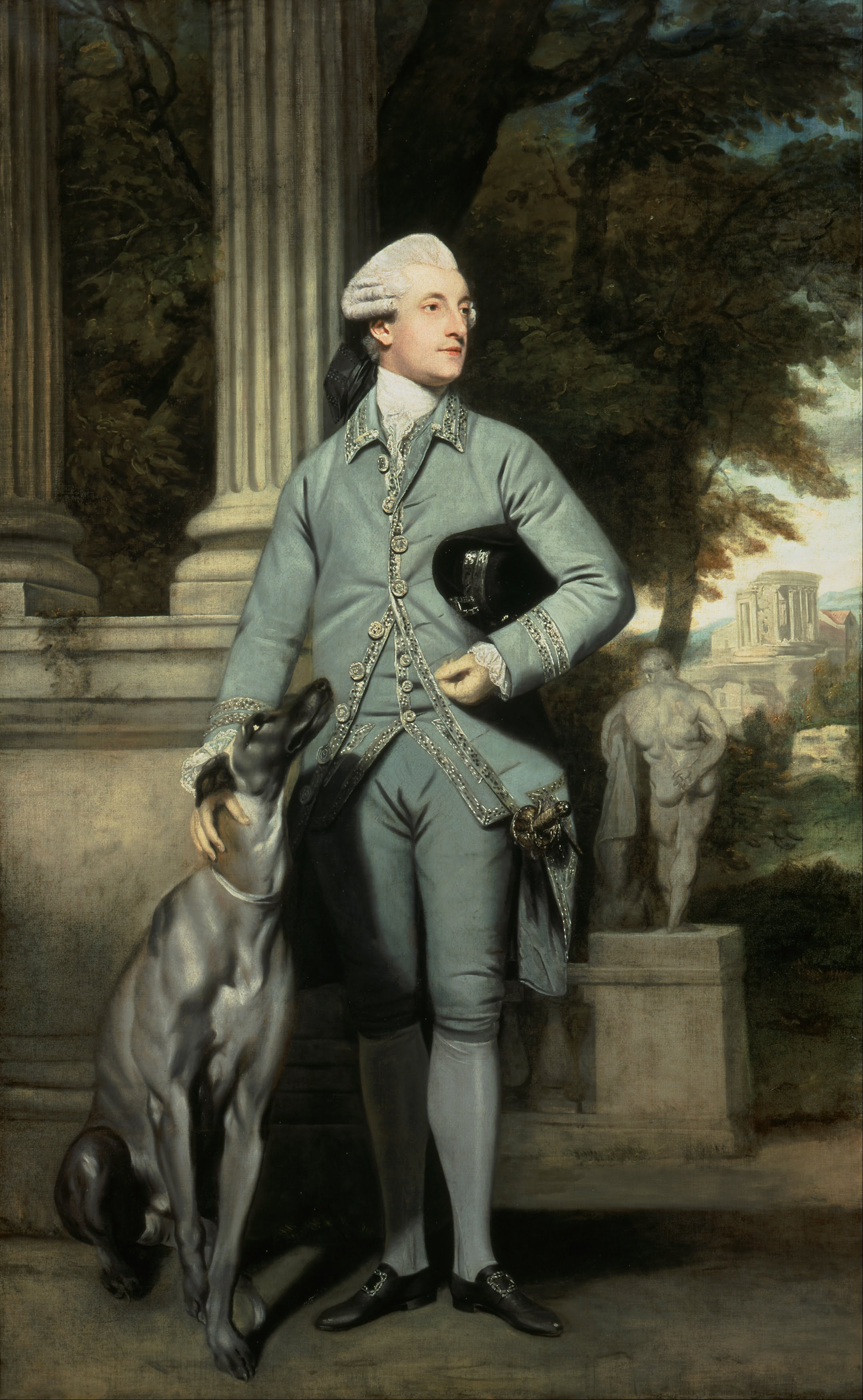
Sir Richard Peers Symons, Baronet (1770-1771)

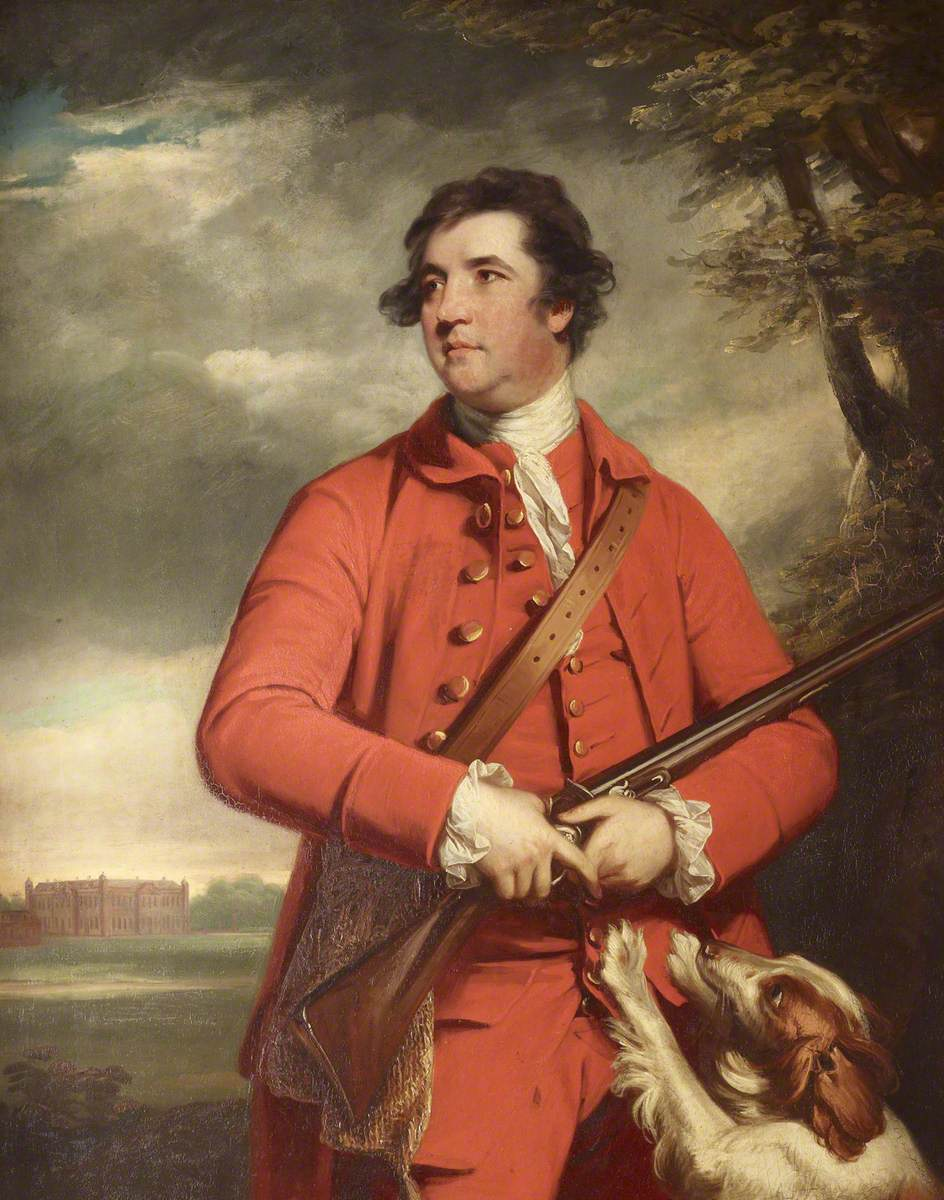
Sir Charles Davers, 6th Bt (1773)

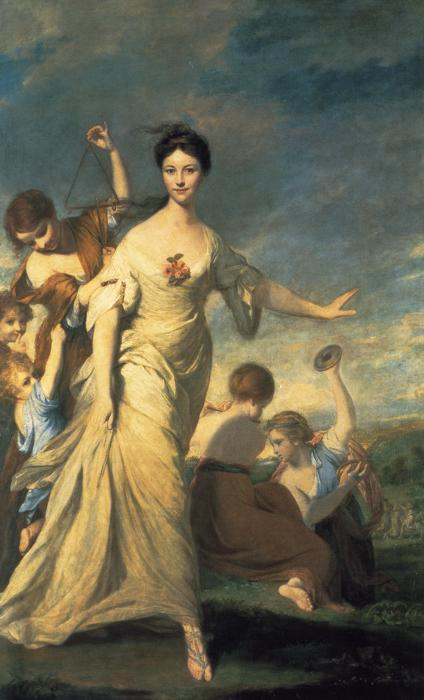
Mrs John Hale (1762-1764)

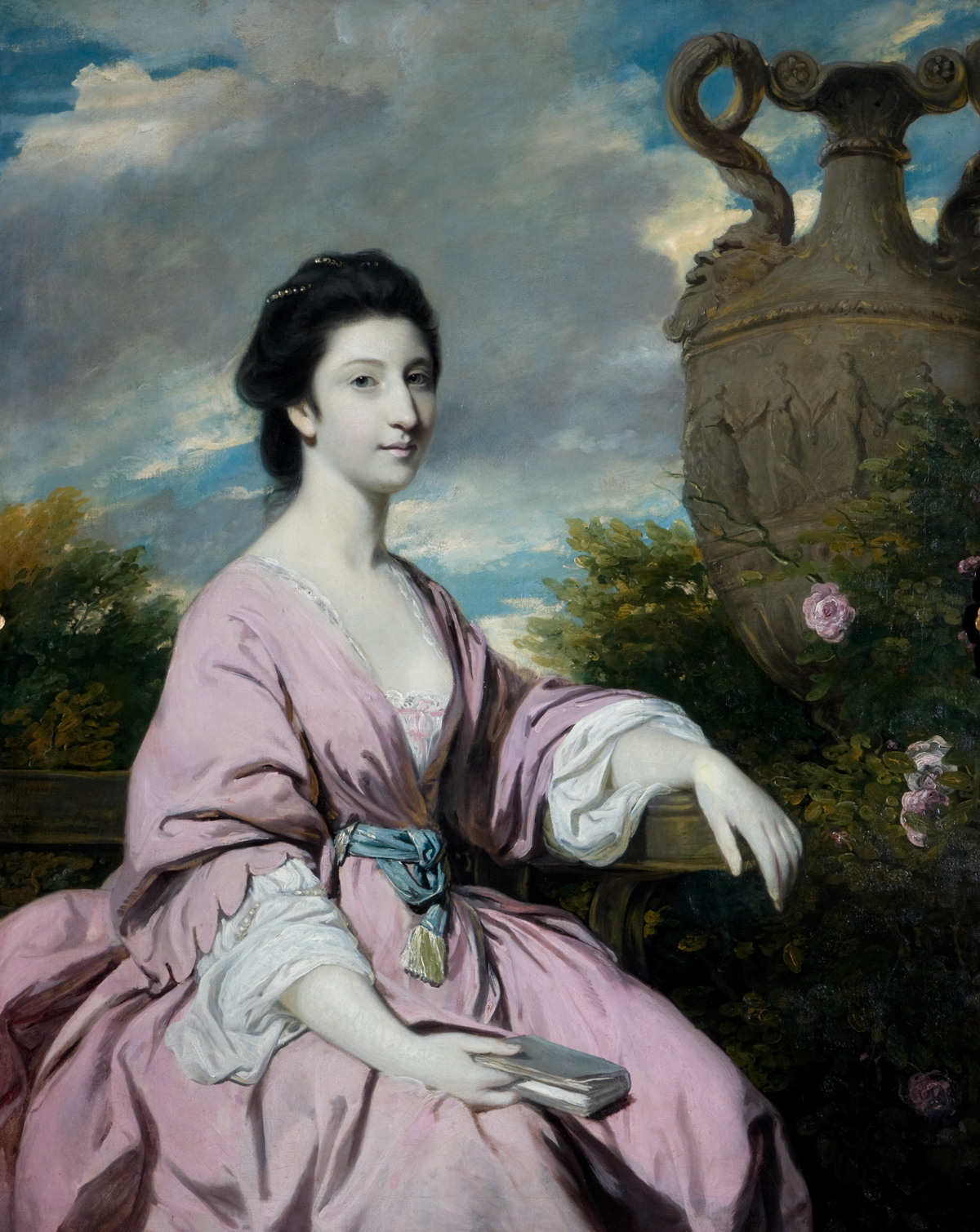
Theodosia Meade, Countess of Clanwilliam (Miss Hawkins-Magill)

== See also ==
- English art
- Grand manner
- Mary Nesbitt, 18th-century courtesan who began her career as Reynolds' model.
- Martin Postle, an expert on Joshua Reynolds

Court offices
Preceded by Allan Ramsay	Principal Painter in Ordinary to the King; 1784–1792	Succeeded by Thomas Lawrence
Cultural offices
New title	President of the Royal Academy; 1768–1792	Succeeded by Benjamin West
