= 1778 in art =

Events from the year 1778 in art.

== Events ==
- 24 April – The Royal Academy Exhibition of 1778 opens at Pall Mall in London
- December – The artistic cargo of the British ship Westmorland, seized by the French, is acquired by Spanish interests.
- Nicholas Pocock gives up his career as a seaman and devotes himself to painting.

== Paintings ==
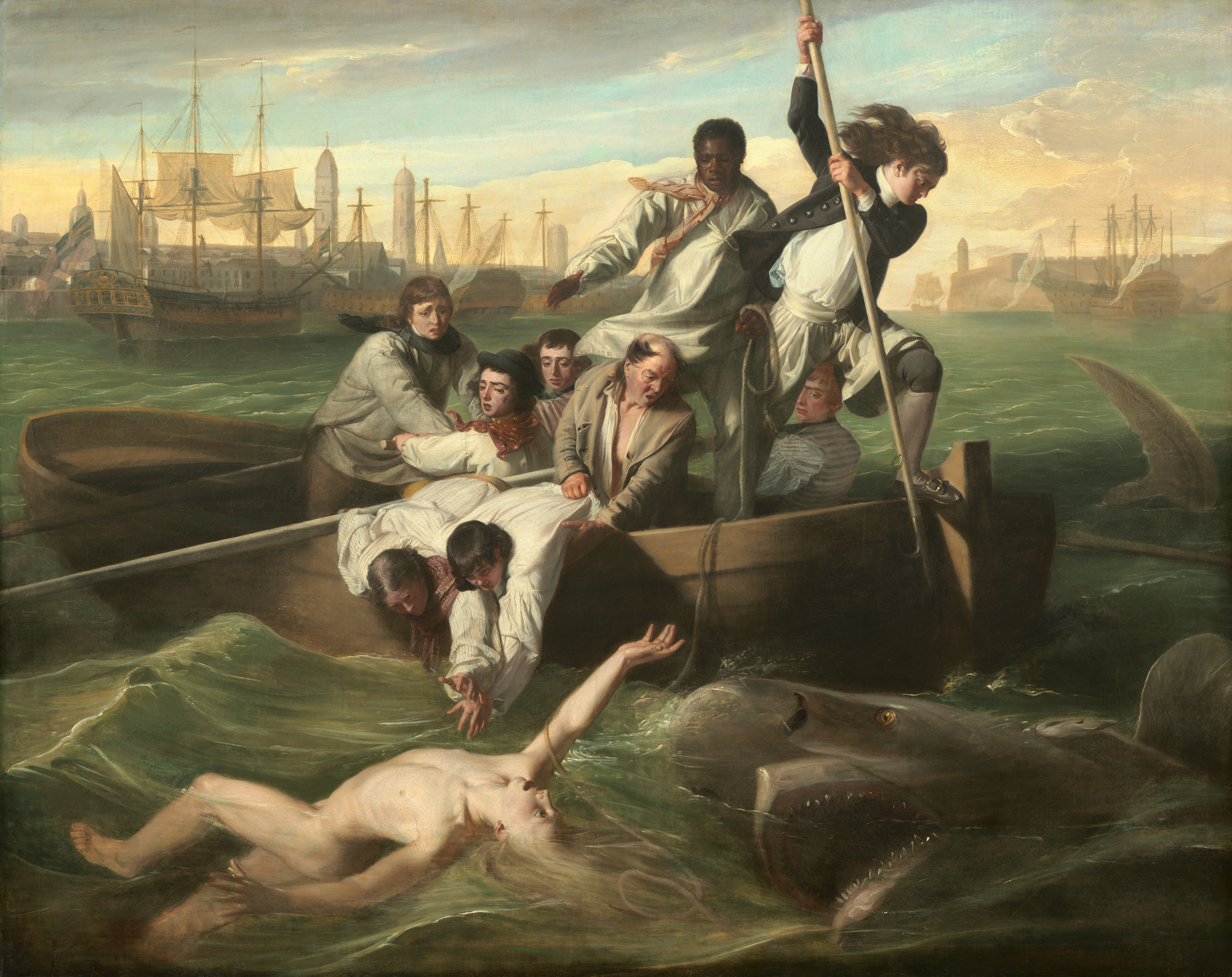
John Singleton Copley – Watson and the Shark

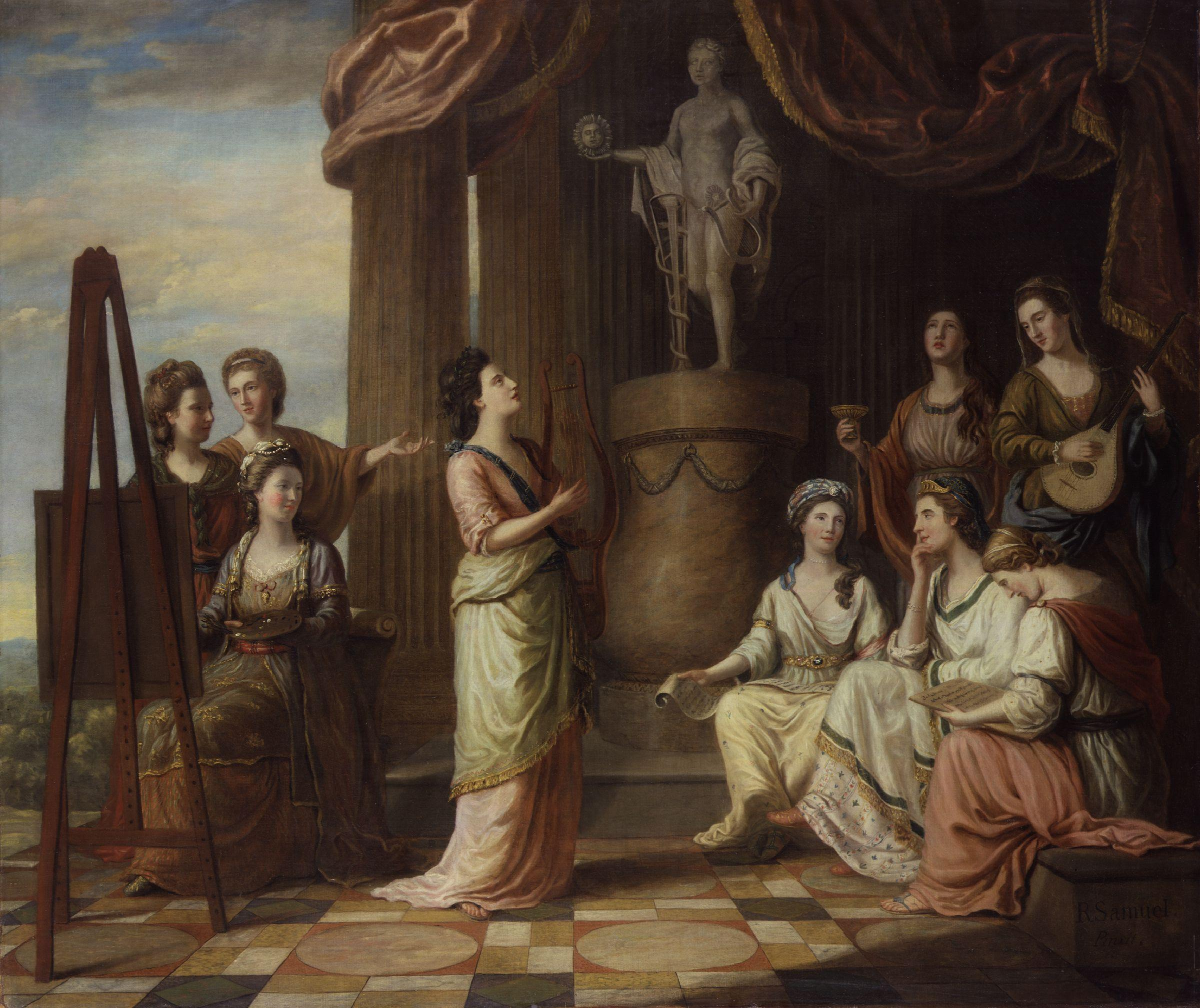
Richard Samuel – Portraits in the Characters of the Muses in the Temple of Apollo.

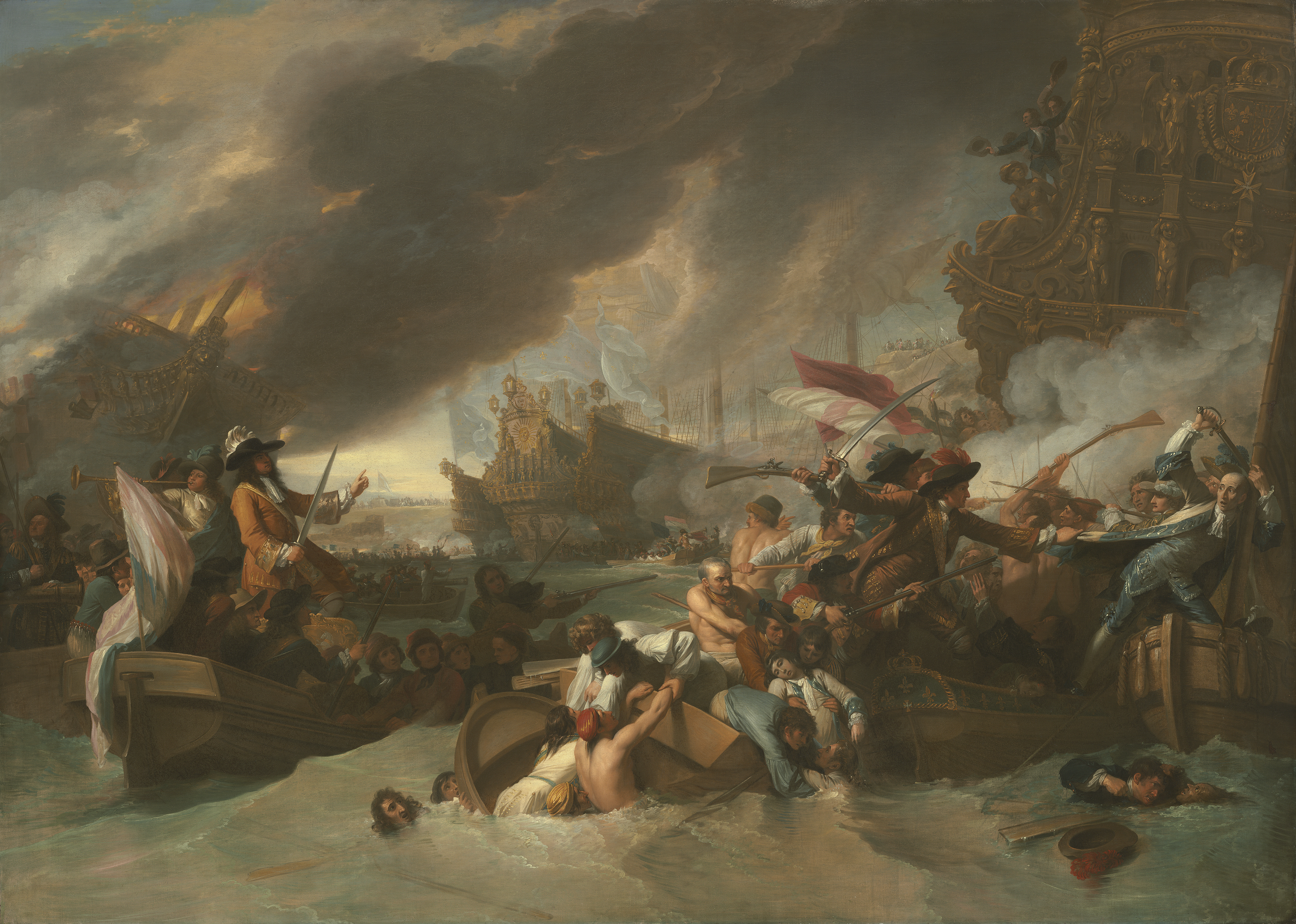
Benjamin West – The Battle of La Hogue.

- John Singleton Copley – Watson and the Shark
- Thomas Gainsborough
  - Portrait of Philip James de Loutherbourg
  - Portrait of James Christie
- Francisco Goya – Children With a Cart
- William Hodges – Ludlow Castle, Shropshire
- Jean-Antoine Houdon – Portrait busts of Rousseau and Voltaire
- Angelica Kauffman – Zeuxis Selecting Models for His Painting of Helen of Troy
- Élisabeth Vigée Le Brun – Portrait of Joseph Vernet
- David Martin – Dido Elizabeth Belle and Lady Elizabeth Murray
- John Hamilton Mortimer – Sir Arthegal, the Knight of Justice, with Talus, the Iron Man (from Spenser’s ‘Faerie Queene’)
- James Northcote – Portrait of Henry Fuseli
- Joshua Reynolds
  - Jane, Countess of Harrington
  - Lady Caroline Howard
  - Captain John Hayes St Leger
  - The Marlborough Family
  - Portrait of Mary Monckton
- George Romney – Jane Gordon, Duchess of Gordon, and Her Son, George Gordon
- Richard Samuel – Portraits in the Characters of the Muses in the Temple of Apollo
- Gilbert Stuart – Self-portrait
- Henry Walton – A Girl Buying a Ballad
- Benjamin West
  - The Battle of the Boyne
  - The Battle of La Hogue
- Johann Zoffany – Tribuna of the Uffizi (completed)

== Births ==
- January 1 – Charles Alexandre Lesueur, artist and explorer (died 1846)
- February 22
  - Franz Ludwig Catel, German artist (died 1856)
  - Rembrandt Peale, American artist (died 1860)
- May 31 – John Jackson, English portrait painter (died 1831)
- June 7 – Beau Brummell, leader of fashion (died 1840)
- June 10
  - Cornelis Cels, Belgian painter of portraits and historical subjects (died 1859)
  - Joseph Willibrord Mähler, German portrait painter (died 1860)
- June 15 – Henri Jean-Baptiste Victoire Fradelle, Franco-English painter (died 1865)
- August 4 – Christian Duttenhofer, German engraver (died 1843)
- August 11 – John Christian Schetky, Scottish-born marine painter (died 1874)
- August 17
  - Johannes Hermanus Koekkoek, Dutch painter (died 1851)
  - John Varley, English watercolour painter and astrologer (died 1842)
  - Johannes Hermanus Koekkoek, Dutch painter and draughtsman (died 1851)
- August 31 – Friedrich August von Klinkowström, German artist, author and teacher (died 1835)
- September 1 – Reverend John Thomson, minister of Duddingston Kirk and Landscape artist (died 1840)
- October 5 – John James Masquerier, British portrait artist (died 1855)
- date unknown
  - Allen Robert Branston, English wood-engraver (died 1827)
  - Wilhelmina Krafft, Swedish painter and portrait miniaturist (died 1828)
  - Nukina Kaioku, Japanese painter and calligrapher (died 1863)
  - Tang Yifen, Chinese landscape painter and calligrapher during the Qing Dynasty (died 1853)

== Deaths ==
- January 4 - Charles-Dominique-Joseph Eisen, French painter and draftsman (born 1720)
- February 19 – Nathan Drake, English painter (born c.1728)
- February 24 – Laurent Delvaux, French sculptor (born 1696)
- March – Thomas Roberts, Irish landscape painter (born 1748)
- March 6 – Gaudenzio Botti, Italian painter, mainly active in Brescia (born 1698)
- May 20 – Gaetano Zompini, Italian printmaker and engraver (born 1700)
- May 25 – Jean-Baptiste Lemoyne, French sculptor (born 1704)
- September 11 – Johann Sebastian Bach, German painter and grandson of the composer (born 1748)
- September 28 – Jean Girardet, French painter of portrait miniatures (born 1709)
- October 2 – Françoise Duparc, Spanish born Baroque painter who later lived in France (born 1726)
- November 9 – Giovanni Battista Piranesi, Italian artist (born 1720)
- December 15 - Catherine Read, Scottish portrait-painter (born 1723)
- December 22 – Simon Mathurin Lantara, French landscape painter (born 1729)
- date unknown
  - John Cobb, English cabinetmaker (born 1710)
  - Ignazio Hugford, or Ignatius Heckford, Florentine painter (born 1703)
  - Wojciech Rojowski, Polish sculptor and woodcarver (born unknown)
  - Pieter Vanderlyn, American colonial painter (born 1687)
