= Royal Academy Exhibition of 1778 =

1778 art exhibition in London

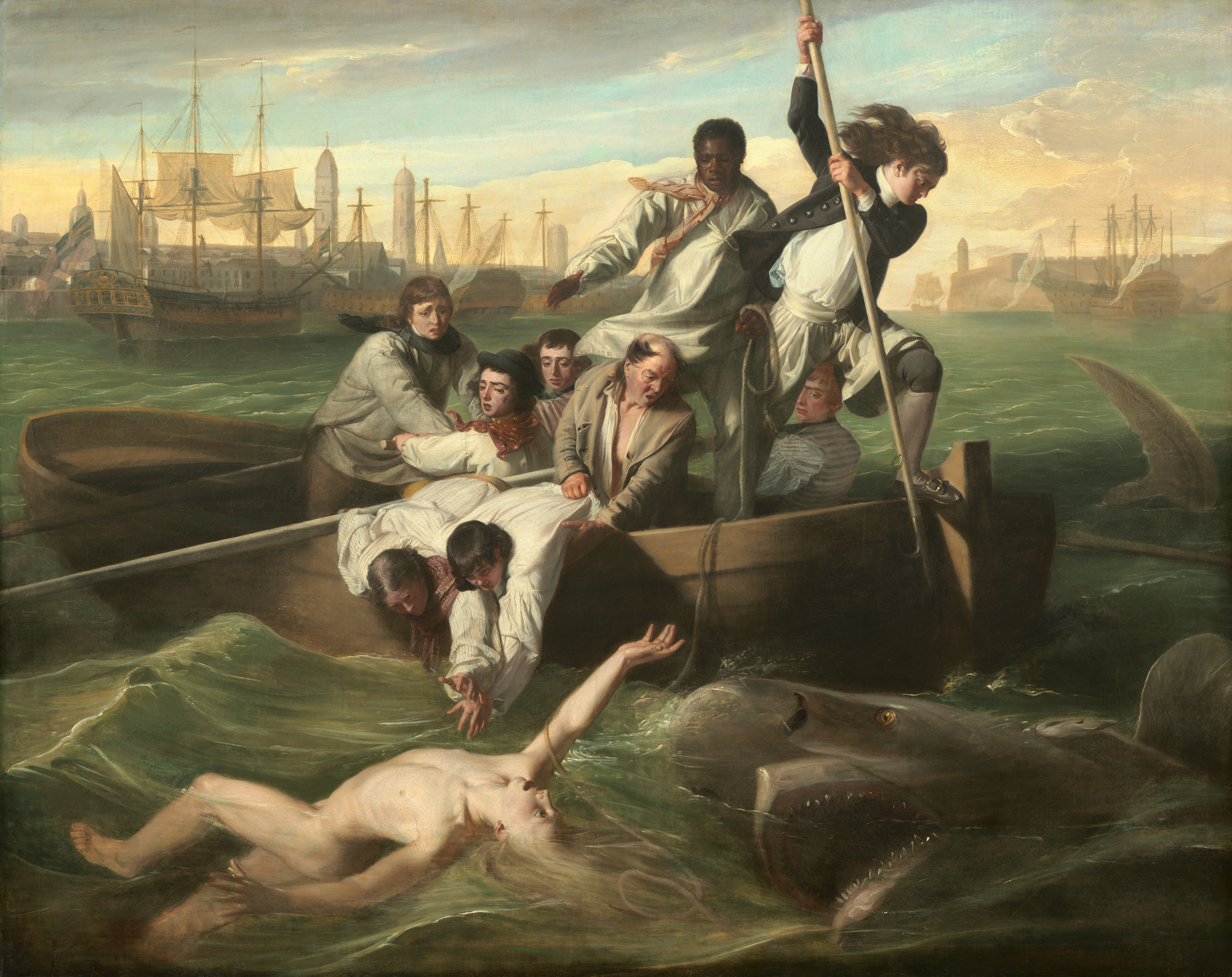
Watson and the Shark by John Singleton Copley

The Royal Academy Exhibition of 1778 was an art exhibition held in London from 24 April to 30 May 1778. It was the tenth annual Summer Exhibition of the Royal Academy of Arts and was staged Pall Mall. It featured submissions from leading painters, sculptors and architects of the period. It was generally deemed a success, attracting a number of artists who had previously exhibited at the rival Society of Artists including George Stubbs, John Hamilton Mortimer, Joseph Wright of Derby and Francis Wheatley. It took place against the backdrop of the American War of Independence taking place a few months after the Treaty of Alliance was signed that led to French's entry into the war against Britain later in the year.

One of the most celebrated works was the American artist John Singleton Copley's Watson and the Shark which depicted an incident that took place in Havana in which Brook Watson was attacked by a shark. He also displayed a group portrait of the American loyalist William Pepperrell and his family. Watson and the Shark was a public success and marked Singleton Copley's breakthrough. He was elected to full membership of the Academy the following year. His fellow American Benjamin West displayed a history painting featuring a scene from the historian John Leland's Itinerary. The painting, now destroyed, was commissioned by the Duke of Rutland who claimed descent from William De Albanac and chose to illustrate a probably apocryphal scene in which he presented his three daughters naked to the King of Mercia for him to choose one as his wife. West also submitted a dual portrait of George, Princes of Wales and his younger brother Frederick, later Duke of York.

The Exhibition continued the ongoing rivalry between the President of the Royal Academy Joshua Reynolds and Thomas Gainsborough. Gainsborough displayed two landscape paintings and eleven portraits. These included Portrait of James Christie, featuring the well-known auctioneer and Portrait of Philip James de Loutherbourg which depicted the French-born painter and set designer. He also displayed the Portrait of the Countess of Chesterfield as well as a companion piece featuring her husband. Reynolds sent in fewer submissions but attracted particular attention for the large group portrait The Marlborough Family produced for Blenheim Palace. John Hamilton Mortimer won praise for his painting of Sir Arthegal from Edmund Spenser's The Faerie Queene.

== Gallery ==
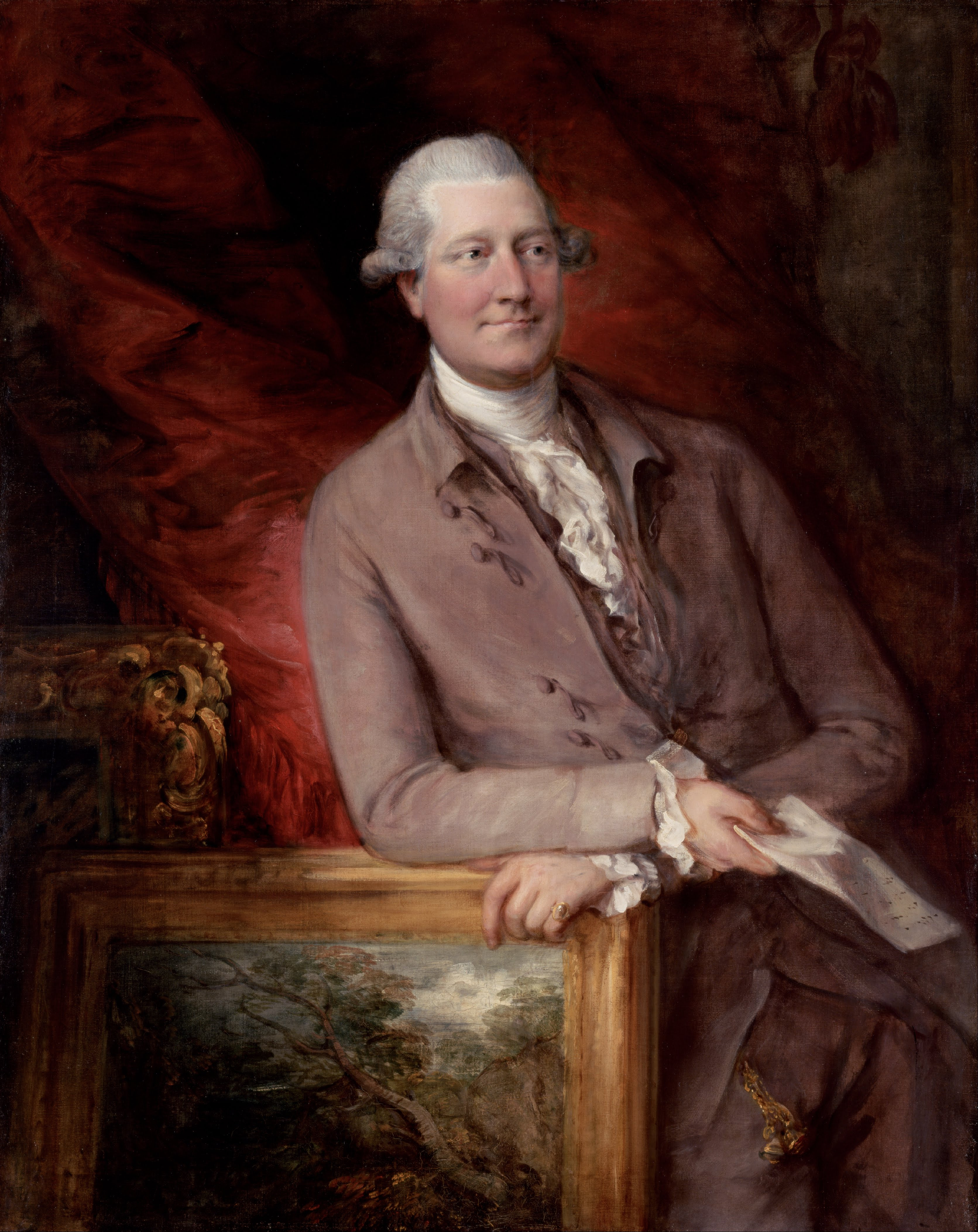
Portrait of James Christie by Thomas Gainsborough

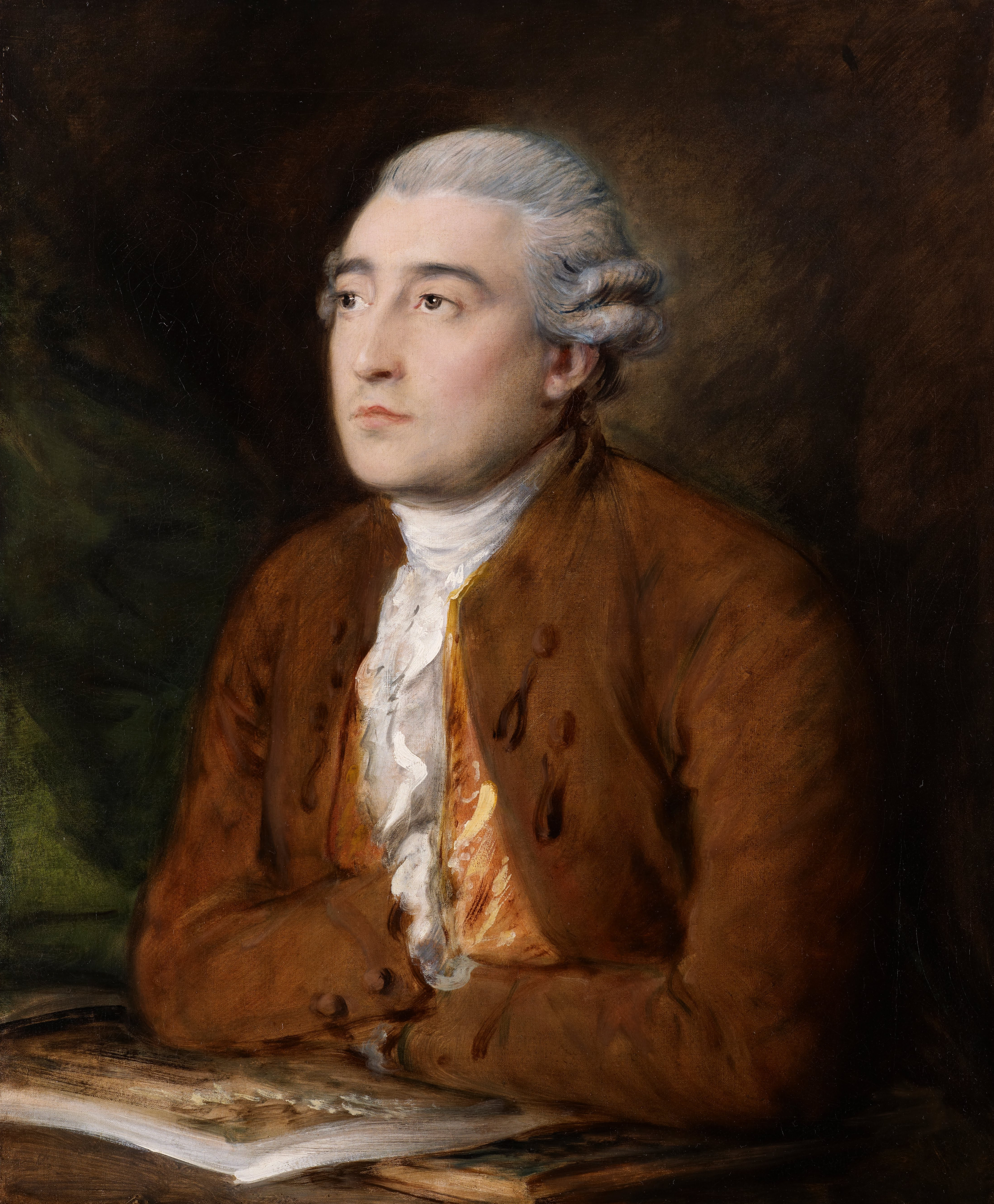
Portrait of Philip James de Loutherbourg by Thomas Gainsborough

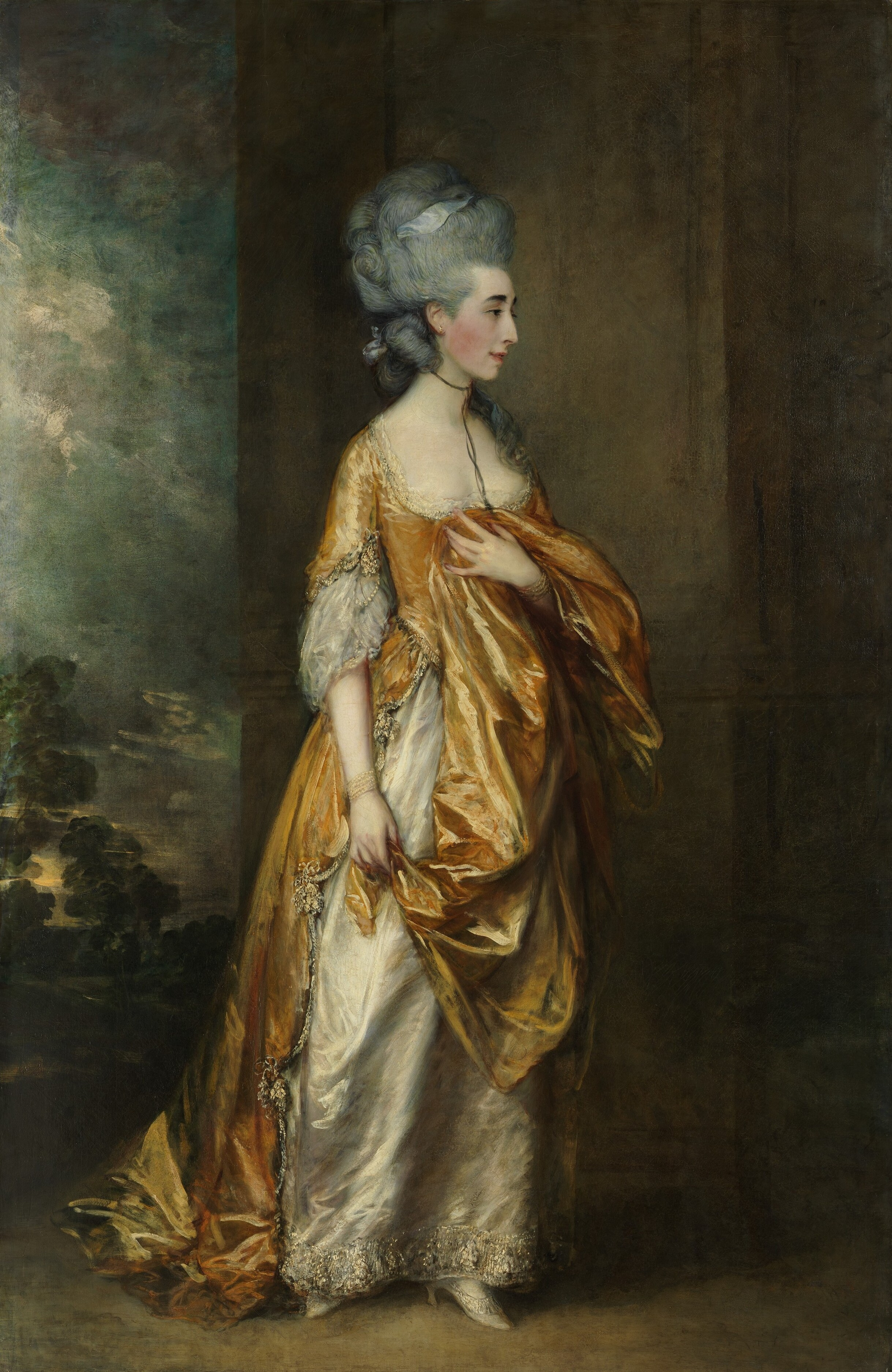
Portrait of Grace Elliott by Thomas Gainsborough

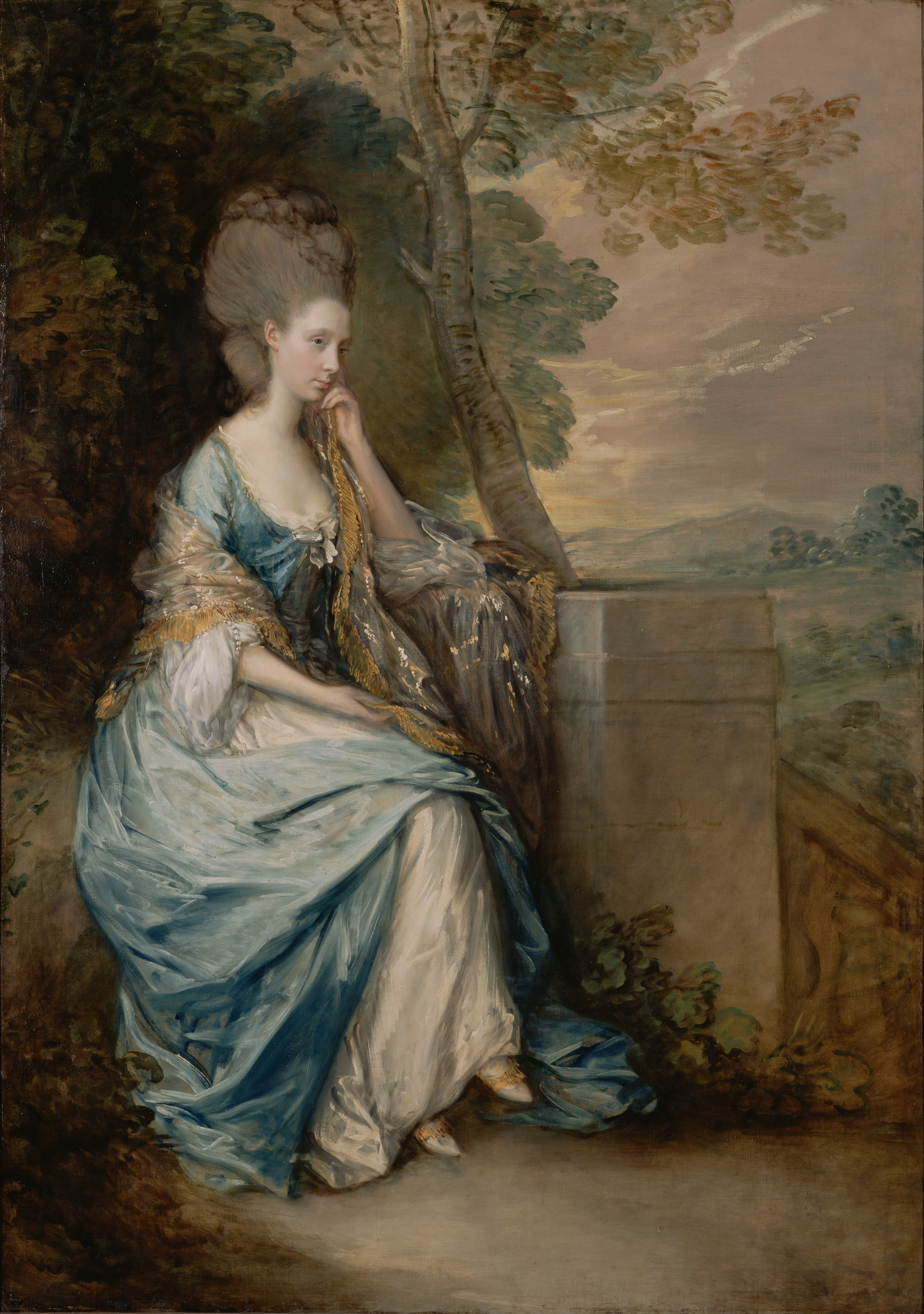
Portrait of Anne, Countess of Chesterfield by Thomas Gainsborough

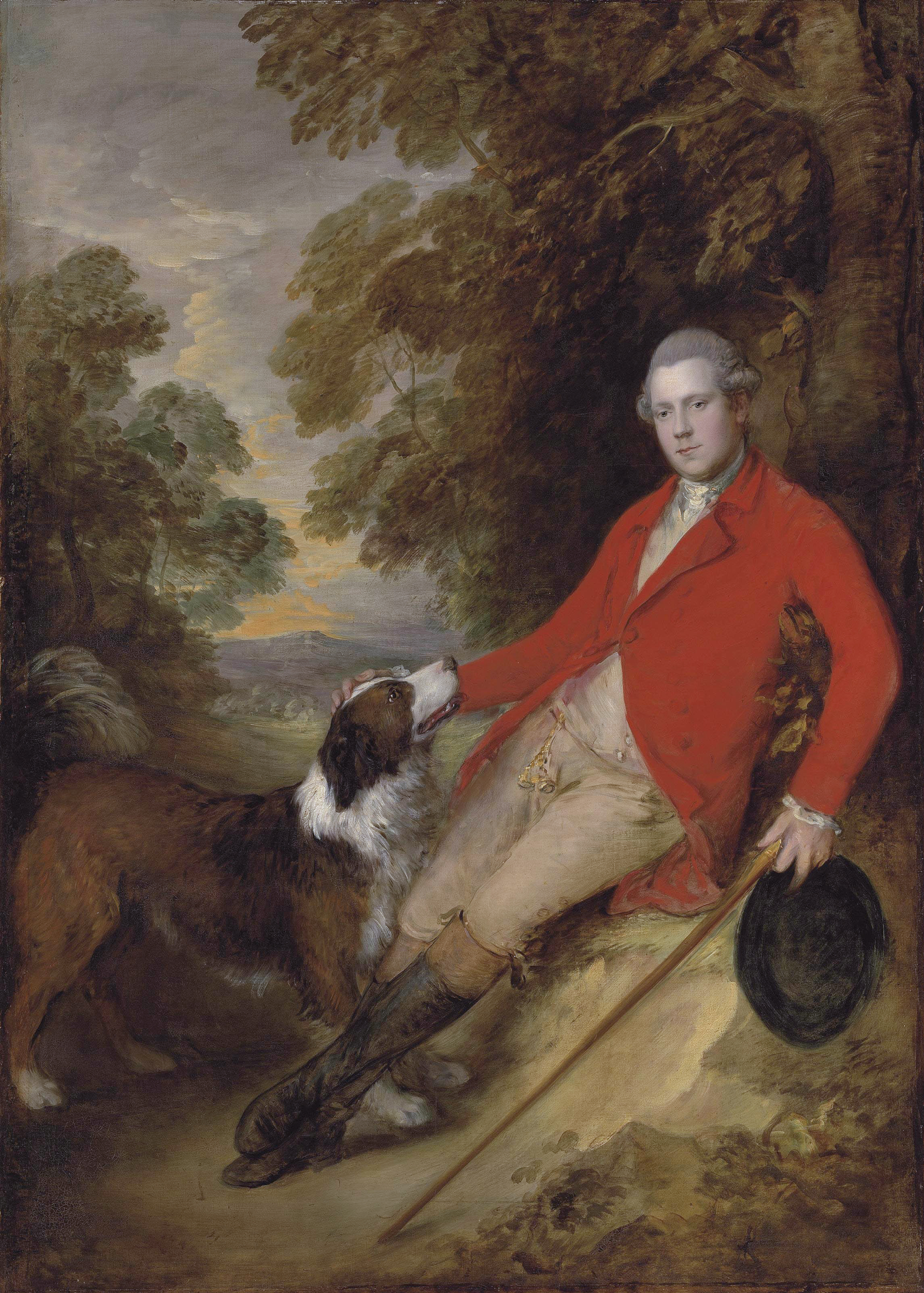
Portrait of the Earl of Chesterfield by Thomas Gainsborough

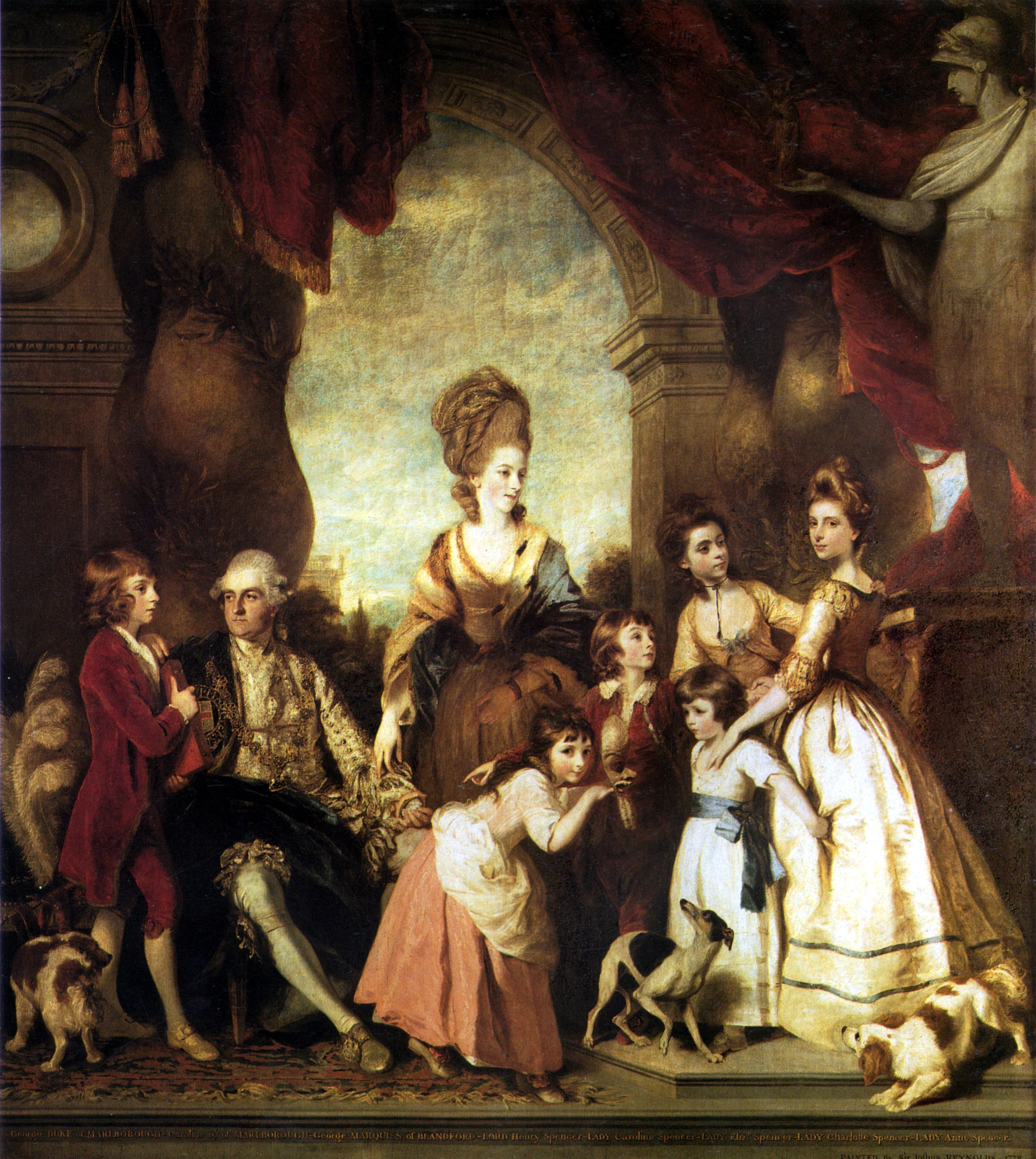
The Marlborough Family by Joshua Reynolds

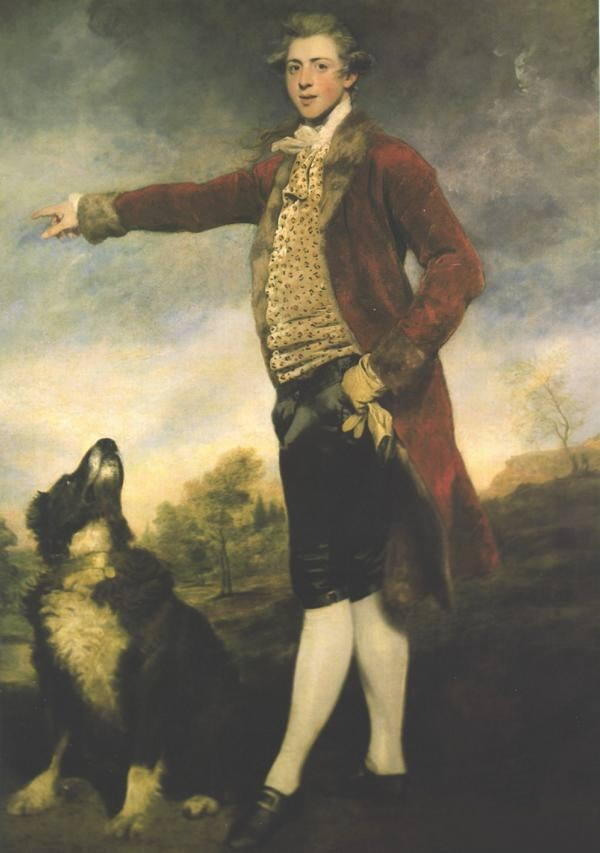
Portrait of John Campbell by Joshua Reynolds

Portrait of William Markham by Joshua Reynolds

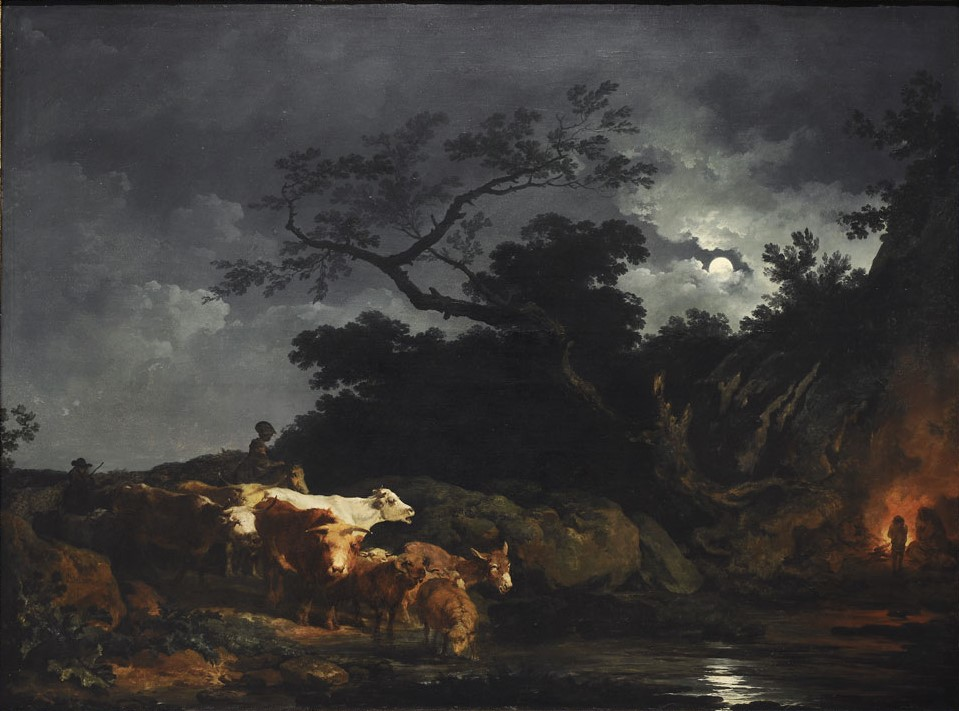
Moonlight by Philip James de Loutherbourg

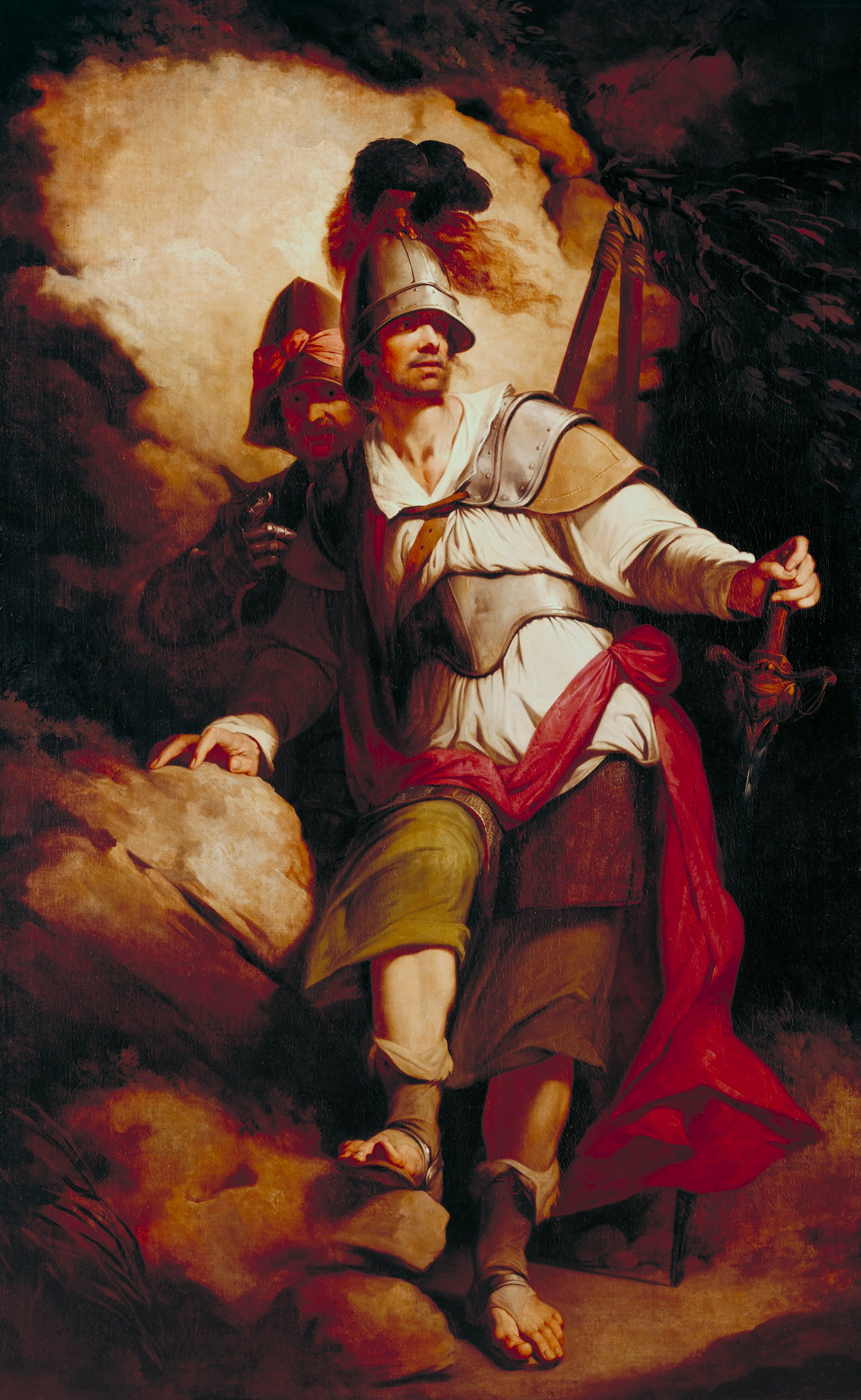
Sir Arthegal, the Knight of Justice, with Talus, the Iron Man by John Hamilton Mortimer

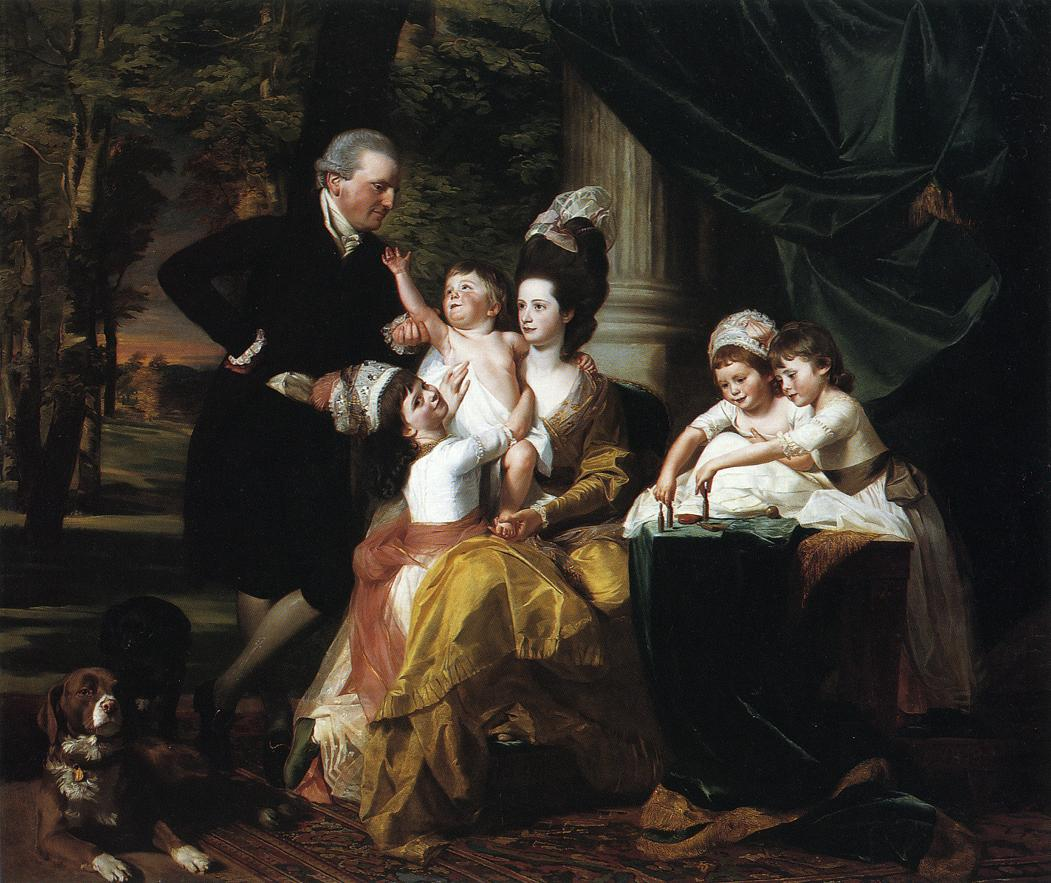
The Pepperrell Family by John Singleton Copley

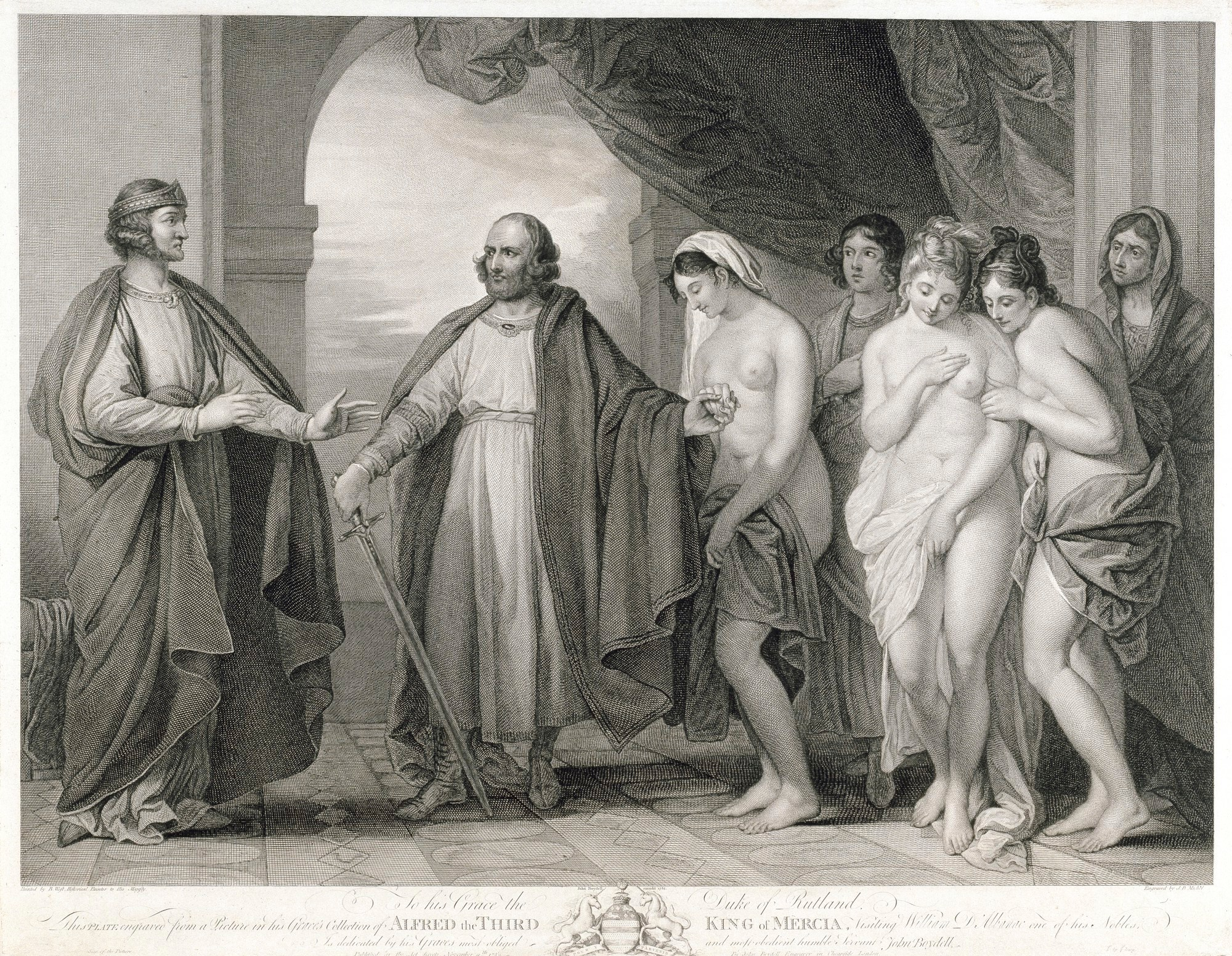
Alfred the Third, King of Mercia, visiting William d'Albanac an engraving by Jean-Baptiste Michel after the original painting by Benjamin West

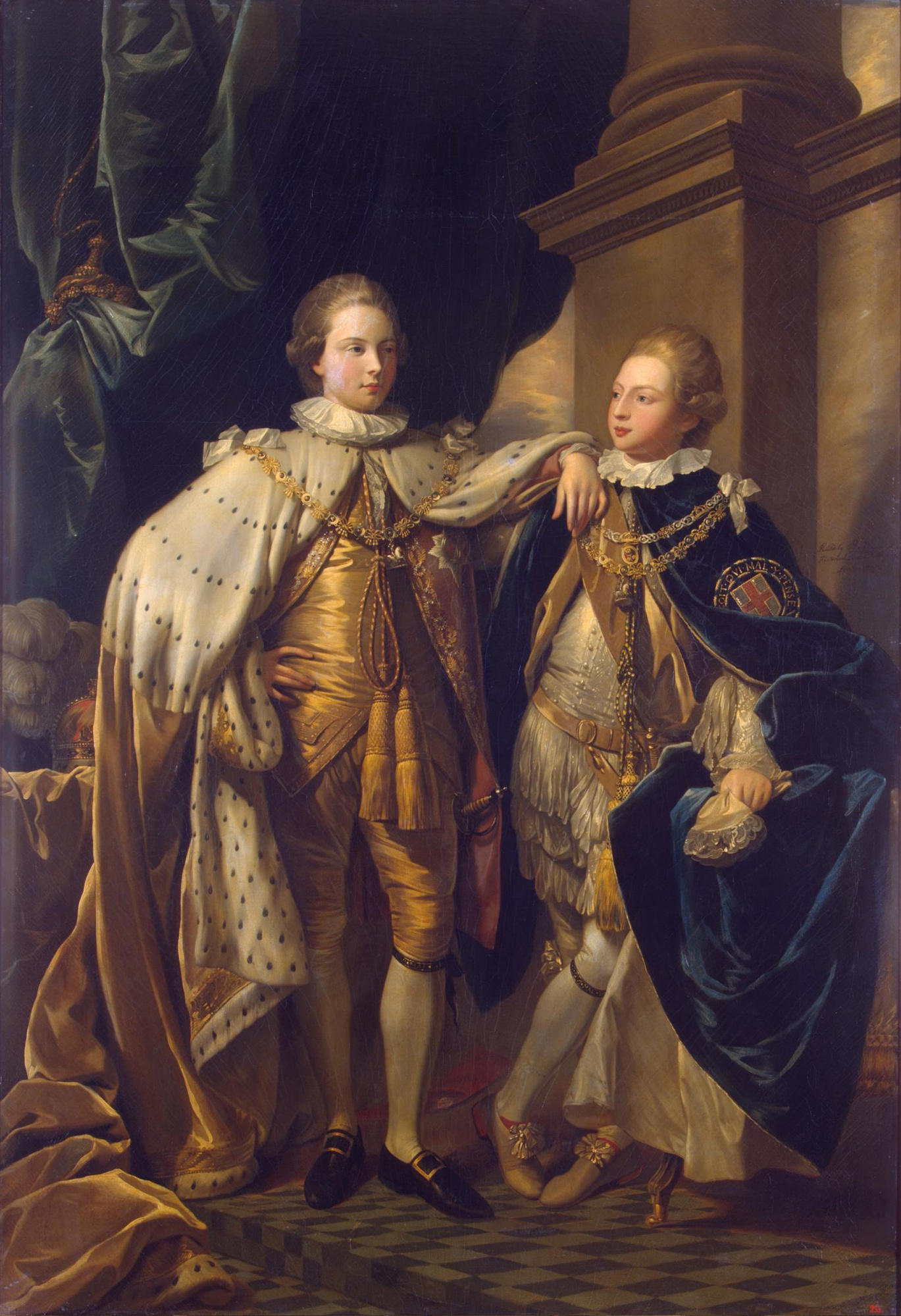
Portrait of the Prince of Wales and Prince Frederick by Benjamin West

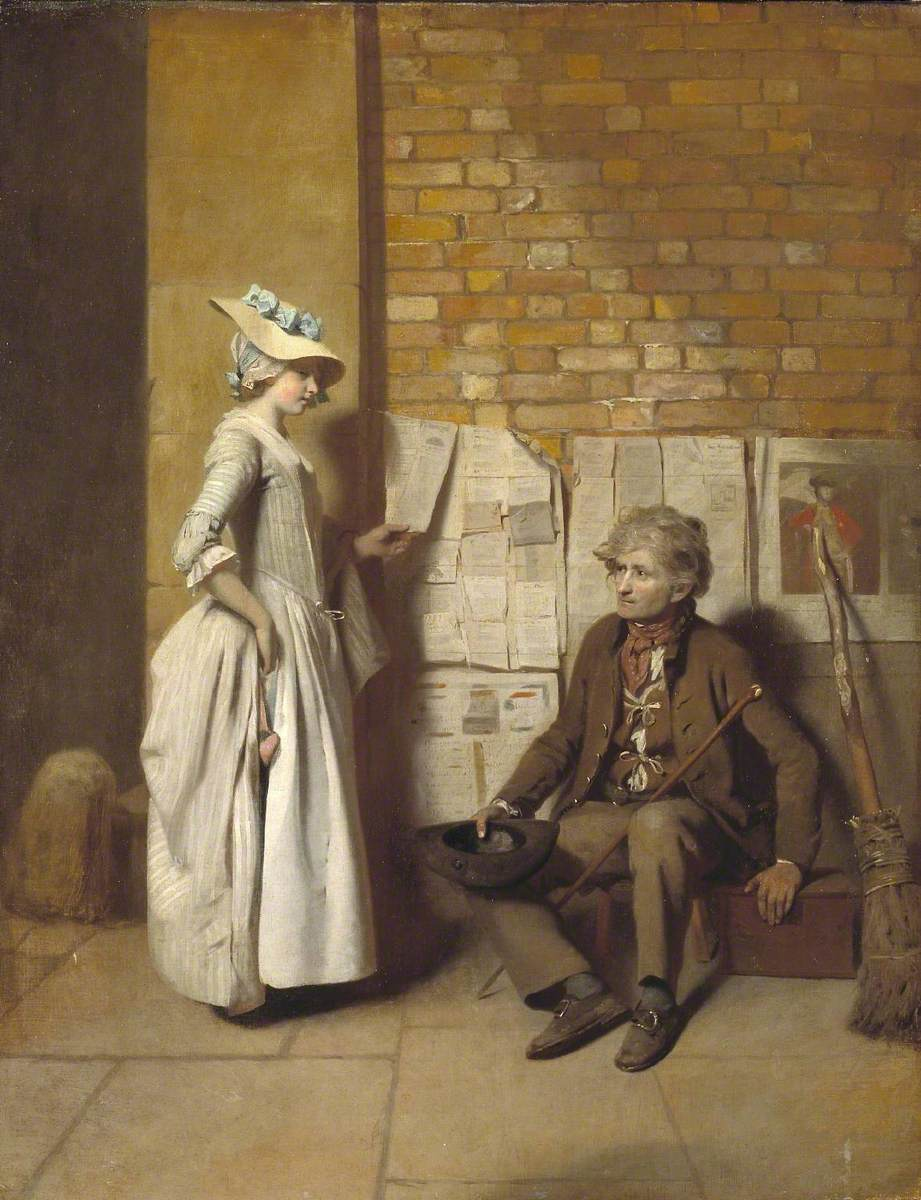
A Girl Buying a Ballad by Henry Walton

View of Bath by Edmund Garvey

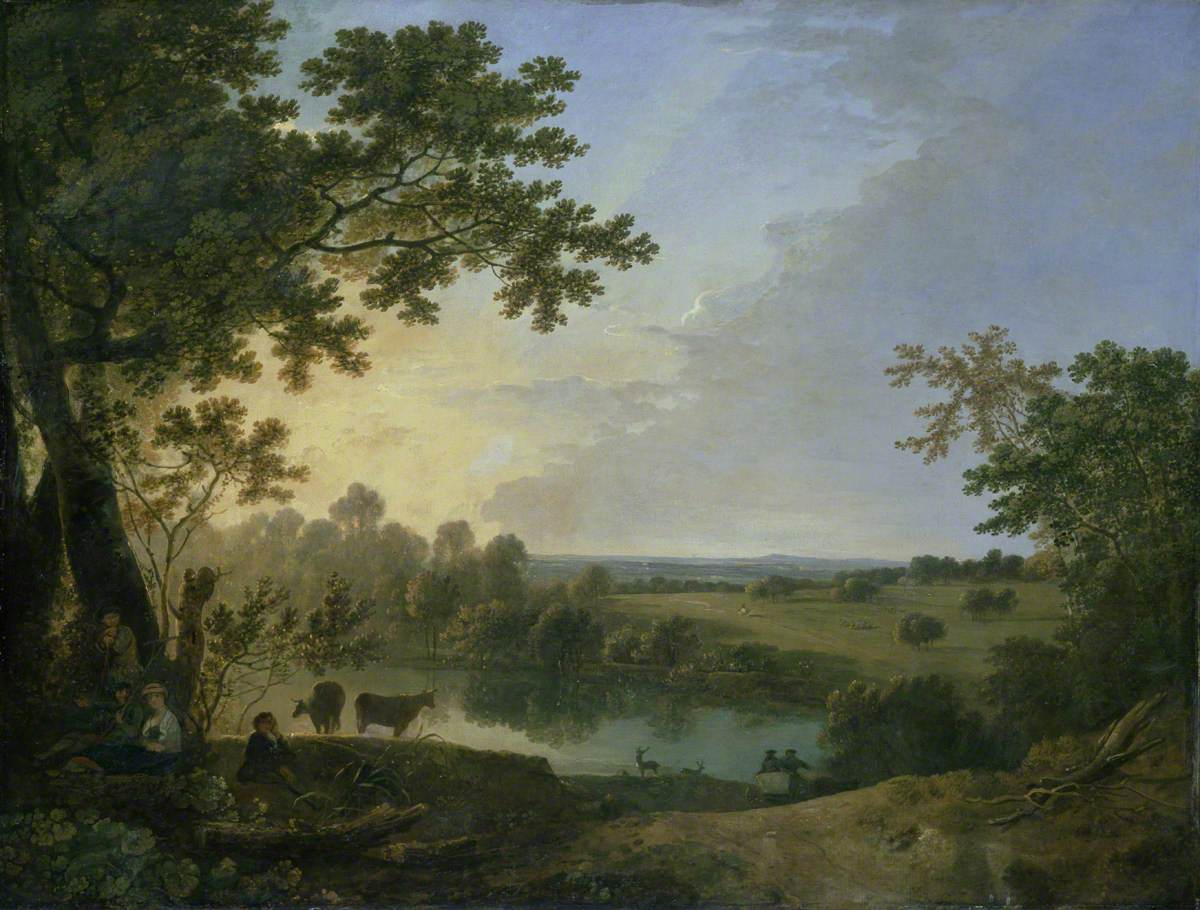
View in Windsor Great Park by Richard Wilson

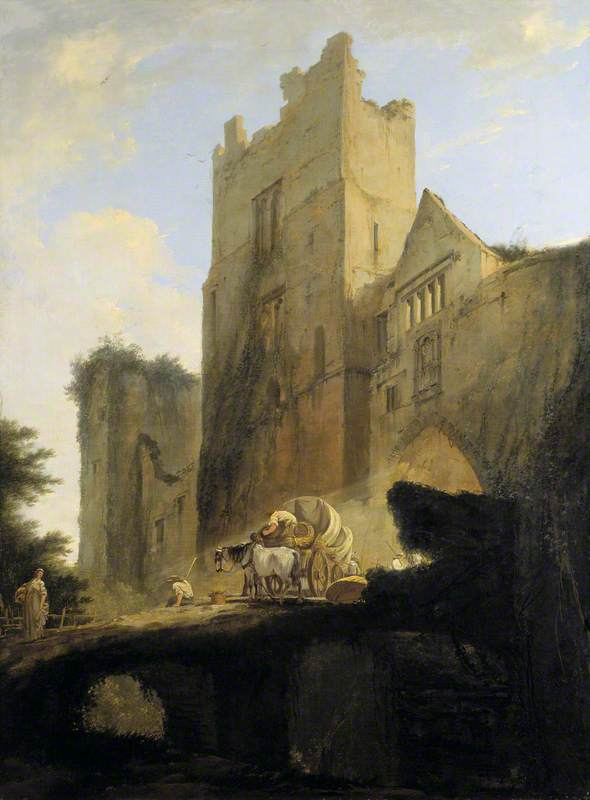
Ludlow Castle, Shropshire by William Hodges

A View of the Island of New Caledonia in the South by William Hodges

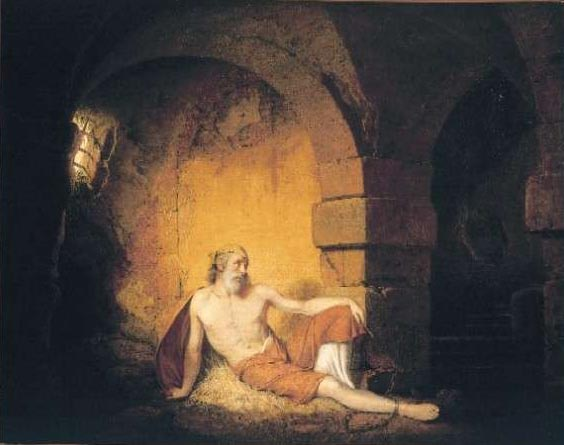
The Captive by Joseph Wright of Derby

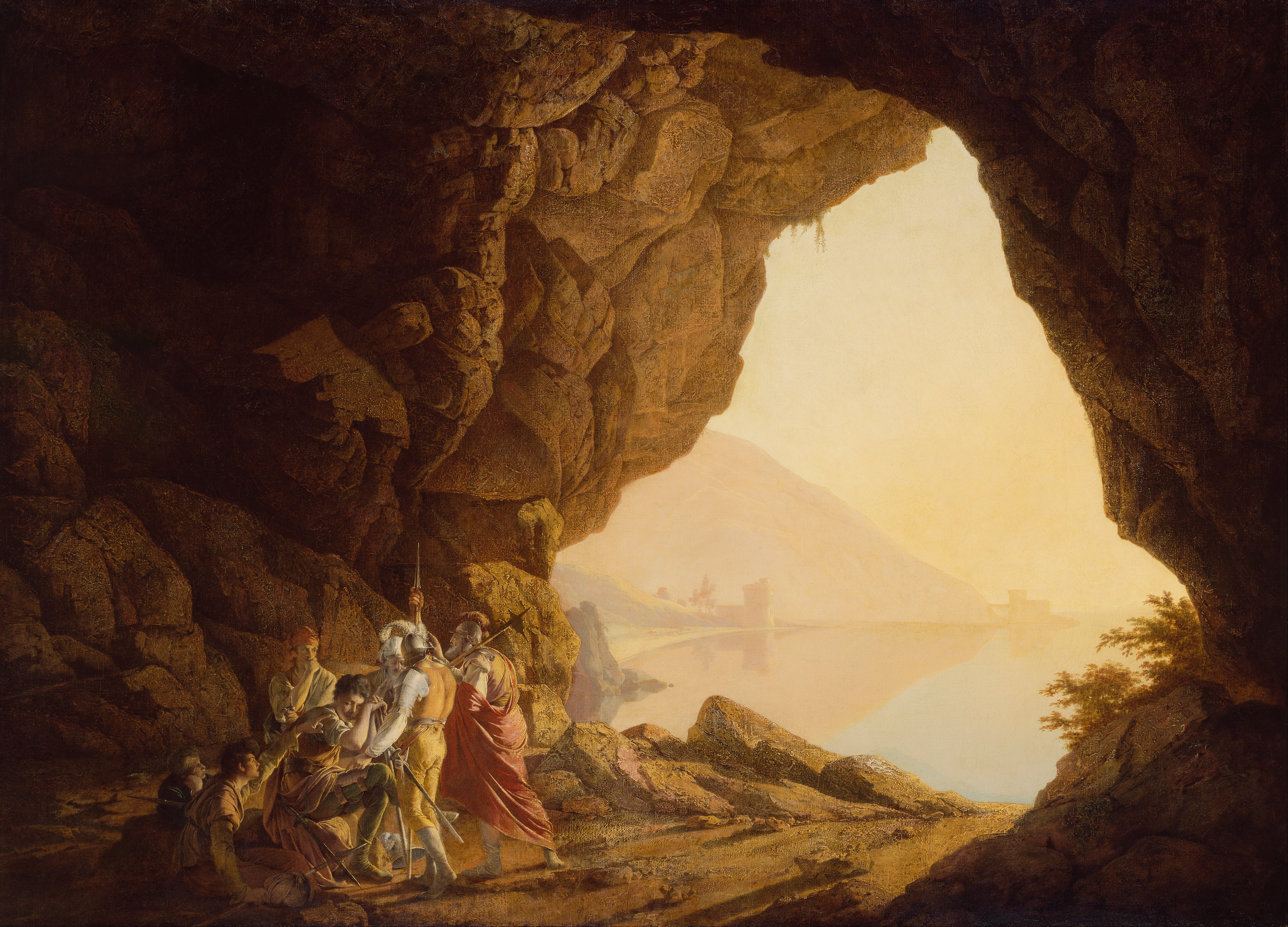
Grotto by the Seaside in the Kingdom of Naples with Banditti, Sunset by Joseph Wright of Derby

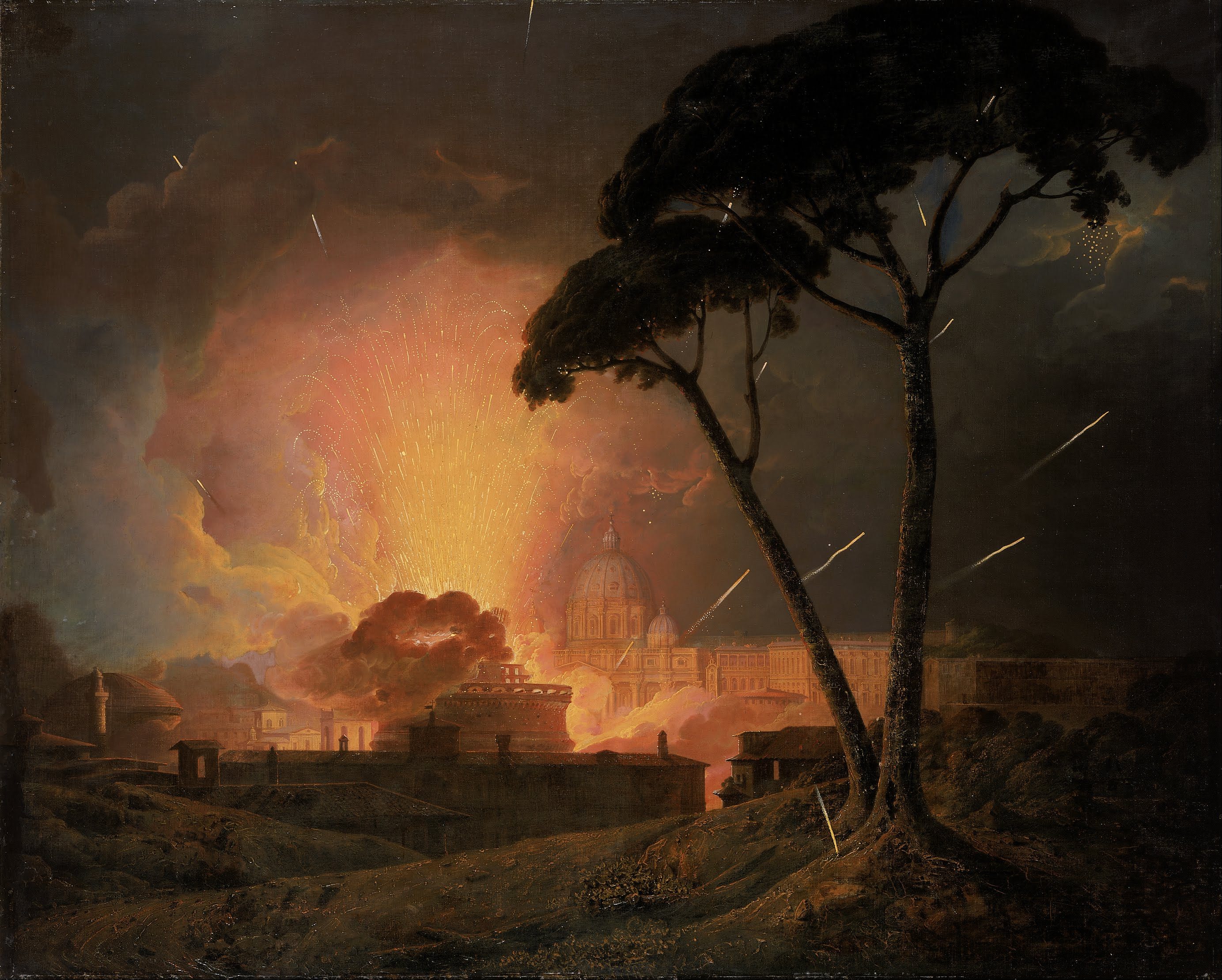
The Annual Girandola at the Castel Sant’Angelo by Joseph Wright of Derby

Woman Playing a Harp by Angelica Kauffman

== Bibliography ==
- Alberts, Robert C. Benjamin West: A Biography. Houghton Mifflin, 1978.
- Hamilton, James. Gainsborough: A Portrait. Hachette UK, 2017.
- Hargreaves, Matthew. Candidates for Fame: The Society of Artists of Great Britain, 1760-1791. Paul Mellon Centre for Studies in British Art, 2005.
- Kamensky, Jane. A Revolution in Color: The World of John Singleton Copley. W. W. Norton & Company, 2016.
- McIntyre, Ian. Joshua Reynolds: The Life and Times of the First President of the Royal Academy. Allen Lane, 2003.
- Smith, Anthony D. The Nation Made Real: Art and National Identity in Western Europe, 1600-1850. OUP Oxford, 2013.
