= Lady Howard =

Lady Howard may refer to:

== Peerages and baronetcies ==
- Wives of the Barons Howard
- Wives of the Viscounts Howard of Bindon
- Wives of the Howard baronets

== People ==
- Anne of York, Lady Howard (1475–1511), English princess
- Catherine Howard (c. 1523–1542), Queen of England
- Gwendolen Fitzalan-Howard, Duchess of Norfolk (1877–1945), British aristocrat
- Georgiana Howard, Countess of Carlisle (1783– 1858), English aristocrat
- Edith Howard, Lady Howard, wife of Sir Ebenezer Howard
- Louise Howard, Lady Howard (1880–1969), British scholar and civil servant
- Manci Howard, Lady Howard of Effingham (1912–2003), Hungarian adventuress
- Sandra Howard, Lady Howard of Lympne (born 1940), English novelist
- Lady Tessa Fitzalan-Howard (born 1950), British aristocrat
- Lady Marcia Fitzalan-Howard (born 1953), English actress
- Lady Gerald Fitzalan-Howard, English aristocrat
- Lady Howard Mabuza, Swazi politician

== Other ==
- Lady Caroline Howard, painting by Sir Joshua Reynolds
