= Nukina Kaioku =

Japanese painter and calligrapher (1778–1863)

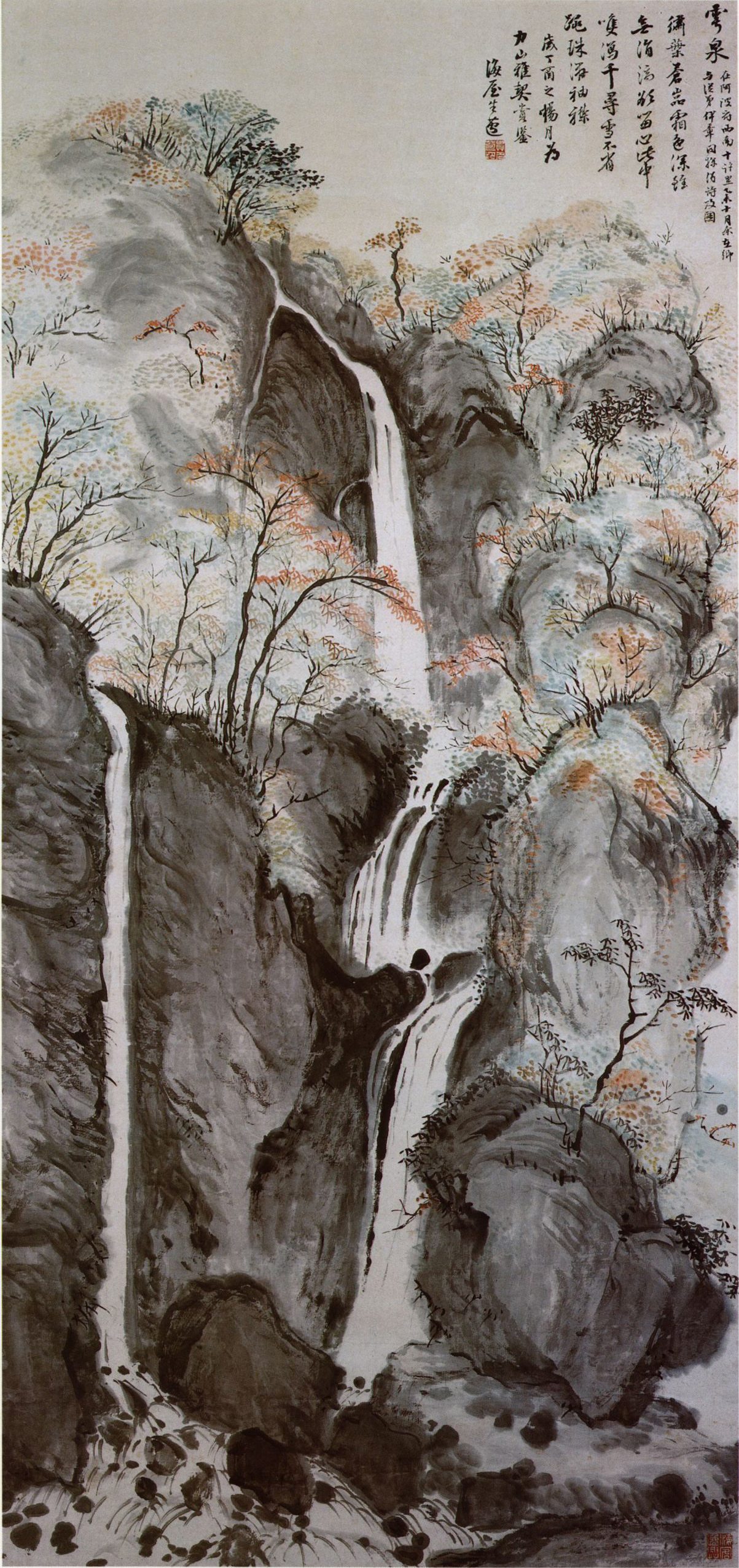
Mount Unzen in Autumn by Nukina Kaioku, ink color on paper, hanging scroll, Honolulu Museum of Art

Nukina Kaioku (貫名 海屋, 1778–1863) was a Japanese painter and calligrapher. He had many pseudonyms, but Kaioku (海屋) and Sūō (菘翁) are the most well-known. He was considered a leader in the field of Japanese calligraphy during the Edo period. He was also good at painting in the Nanga style, which is a Japanese artistic style mean to emulate Chinese art and culture.

== Early life ==
Nukina Kaioku was born on Shikoku in the Awa Province. Nukina Kaioku was born into a samurai family of hereditary archery instructors to the daimyō of the Hachisuka clan of the Awa Province. The typical samurai education included the martial arts, from which Kaioku's physical frailty exempted him, and Confucian philosophy, the Chinese classics, calligraphy and painting. He exhibited outstanding talent in calligraphy, and his uncle, who was a priest of the Kōyasan Shingon-shū on Mount Kōya, encouraged his interest in the writing style of Kūkai.

== Legacy and style ==
By the end of his life, Kaioku was recognized both as one of the most outstanding calligraphers of his time and was also admired in his role as a scholar of Chinese writing styles. Along with Maki Ryoko and Ichikawa Beian, he was one of the renowned calligraphers in groups of three referred to as Sanpitsu, or three brushes, during the Bakumatsu period (Bakumatsu no Sanpitsu). His mature calligraphy style was conservative and fairly faithful to the orthodox tradition of the 4th-century Chinese master Wang Xizhi. He was also versatile, and his calligraphy shows a solid mastery of the major modes of Kara-e (Chinese-style) writing.
