= Ludlow Castle, Shropshire =

Painting by William Hodges

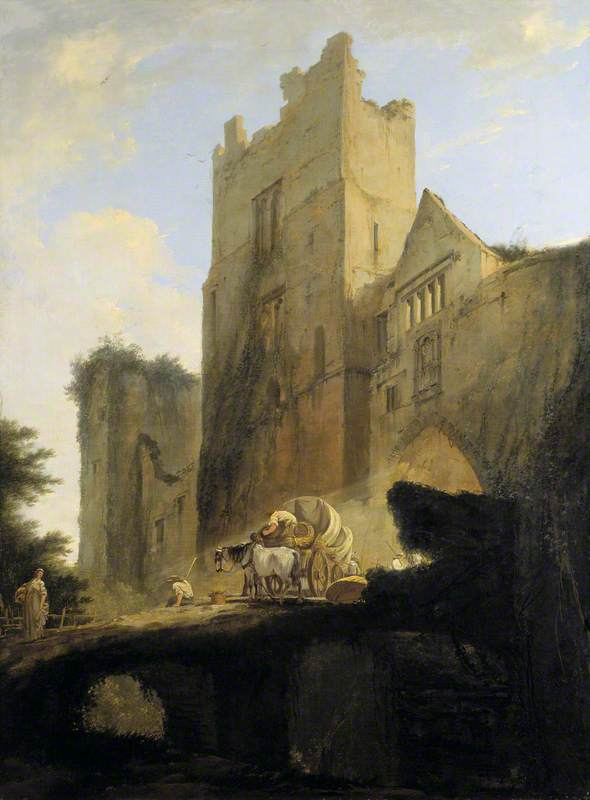
- Artist: William Hodges
- Year: 1778
- Type: Oil on canvas, landscape painting
- Dimensions: 119.4 cm × 88.9 cm (47.0 in × 35.0 in)
- Location: Victoria and Albert Museum; London

Ludlow Castle, Shropshire is a 1778 landscape painting by the British artist William Hodges. It portrays the gateway to Ludlow Castle in Shropshire not far from the border with Wales. The painting was part of the growing demand for paintings depicting romanticised historic ruins in Britain.

Hodges is best known for accompanying the second voyage of James Cook, producing many views of the Pacific. After his return to England he made a tour of Wales and the Borders, notably also producing Ruins of Llanthony Abbey which is similar in composition. The painting was displayed at the Royal Academy Exhibition of 1778 held at Pall Mall. Today it is in the collection of the Victoria and Albert Museum in South Kensington, having been purchased in 1880.

== Bibliography ==
- Quilley, Geoff & Bonehill, Jane (ed.) William Hodges 1744-1797: The Art of Exploration. Yale University Press, 2004.
- Roe, Sonia. Oil Paintings in Public Ownership in the Victoria and Albert Museum. Public Catalogue Foundation, 2008.
