= Portrait of Anne, Countess of Chesterfield =

Painting by Thomas Gainsborough

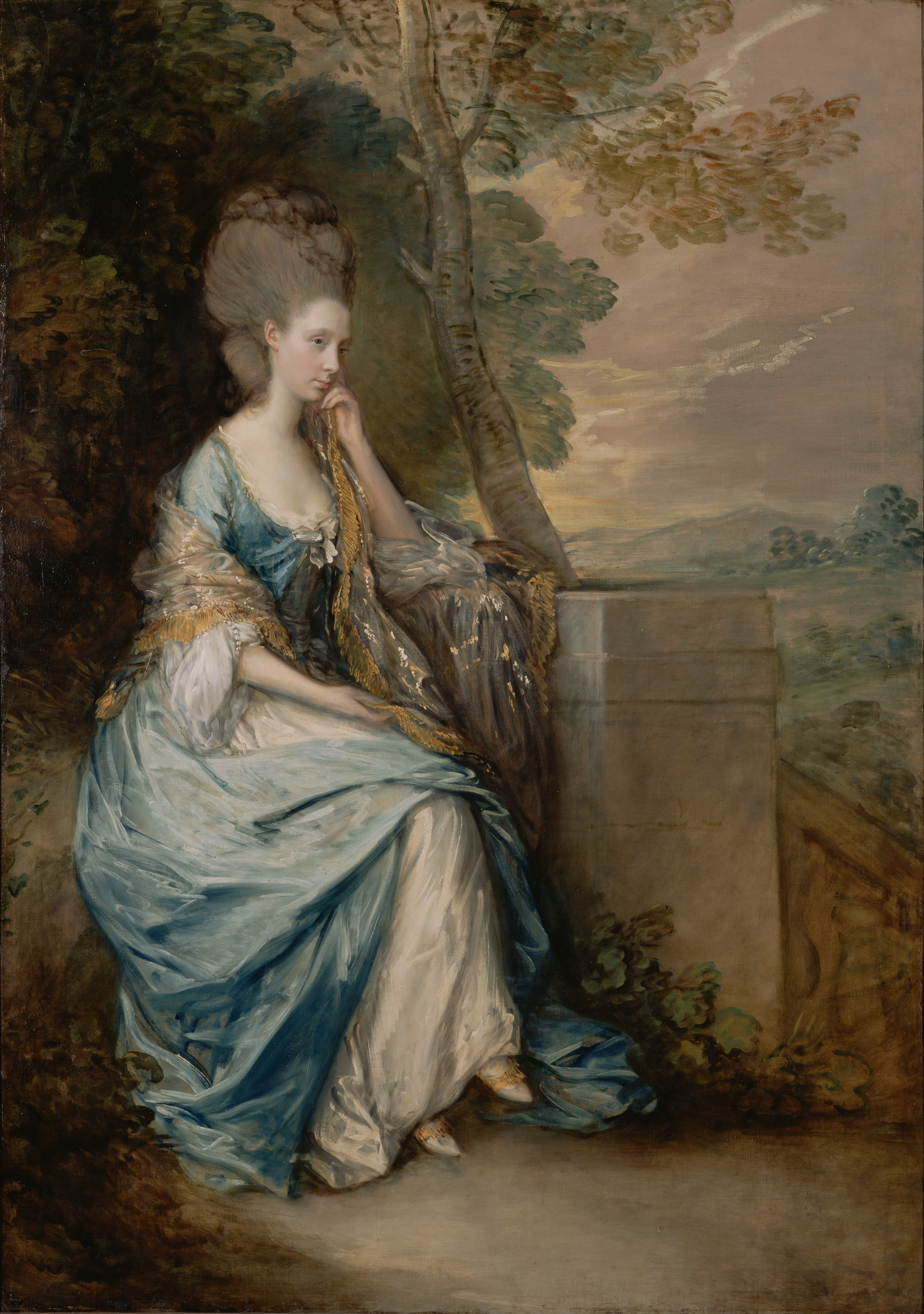
- Portrait of Anne, Countess of Chesterfield
- Artist: Thomas Gainsborough
- Year: 1777-1778
- Medium: Oil-on-canvas
- Subject: Anne, Countess of Chesterfield
- Dimensions: 221 cm × 156.2 cm (87 in × 61.5 in)
- Location: J. Paul Getty Museum, Los Angeles
- Accession: 71.PA.8

Portrait of Anne, Countess of Chesterfield is a large oil-on-canvas painting by the English portrait and landscape artist Thomas Gainsborough, completed between 1777 and 1778. It shows Anne Stanhope (née Thistlethwaite) (d. 1798), wife of Philip Stanhope, 5th Earl of Chesterfield, sitting in a blue and white satin dress, sitting in a garden, and is one of the best known of Gainsborough's many portraits of English aristocrats.

Anne was the daughter of the Reverend Robert Thistlewayte of Southwick Park, Hampshire, who came from that region's gentry. She married George Stanhope in 1777. The painting was begun the same year, and was exhibited at the Royal Academy of Arts, London, the following year.

It is in good condition, although the varnish is discolored in places.

== Description ==
Anne is shown full-length, sitting in an outside setting, facing to her left with her legs crossed, apparently lost in thought. She leans on the stone balustrade of a terrace, while a stairway behind her leads down into the garden. She is dressed in the height of contemporary fashion, including a beige translucent shawl with gold fringe trimmings, and white slippers. Her hair is swept or brushed upwards, in the fashion of the day. He blue and white silk grown is low-cut and off-shoulder. The painting is divided vertically into two halves; behind Anne is dense, enclosed foliage, to her right is an open, unobstructed vista of her husband's estate, with a large view of a cloudy sky. Gainsborough describes the scene with loose and broadly applied brush-strokes, which according to the Getty, convey "a sense of immediacy in the large sweeping brushstrokes used to describe material, foliage, and background sky. Short, curved brushstrokes form the tree trunk, while longer strokes of blue and white paint create an illusion of shimmering, rustling fabric. Small dabs of white and gold paint applied to the shawl lend it a rich, glimmering effect."

A portrait of her husband, Philip, was completed at the same time and was a companion piece until 1959, when Anne's portrait was sold to the J. Paul Getty Museum. The husband is shown facing to the right and leaning against a tree, wearing a scarlet coat, tan breeches and black knee-length riding boots, and holding a stick and black hat in his left hand. He is attended by his brown and white dog.

Gainsborough made two small, bust-length painted studies of Anne during the sitting; one later in the Thistlewayte's family collection in Southwick Park, Hampshire, the other later in the Shirley collection of the Lough Fea estate in County Monaghan, Ireland, until it was sold to a private collection in 2011 for £205,250. The latter version is very similar to the final portrait, but with more gold colours on the dress, while her arm seems oversized compared to the rest of her body.

== Provenance ==
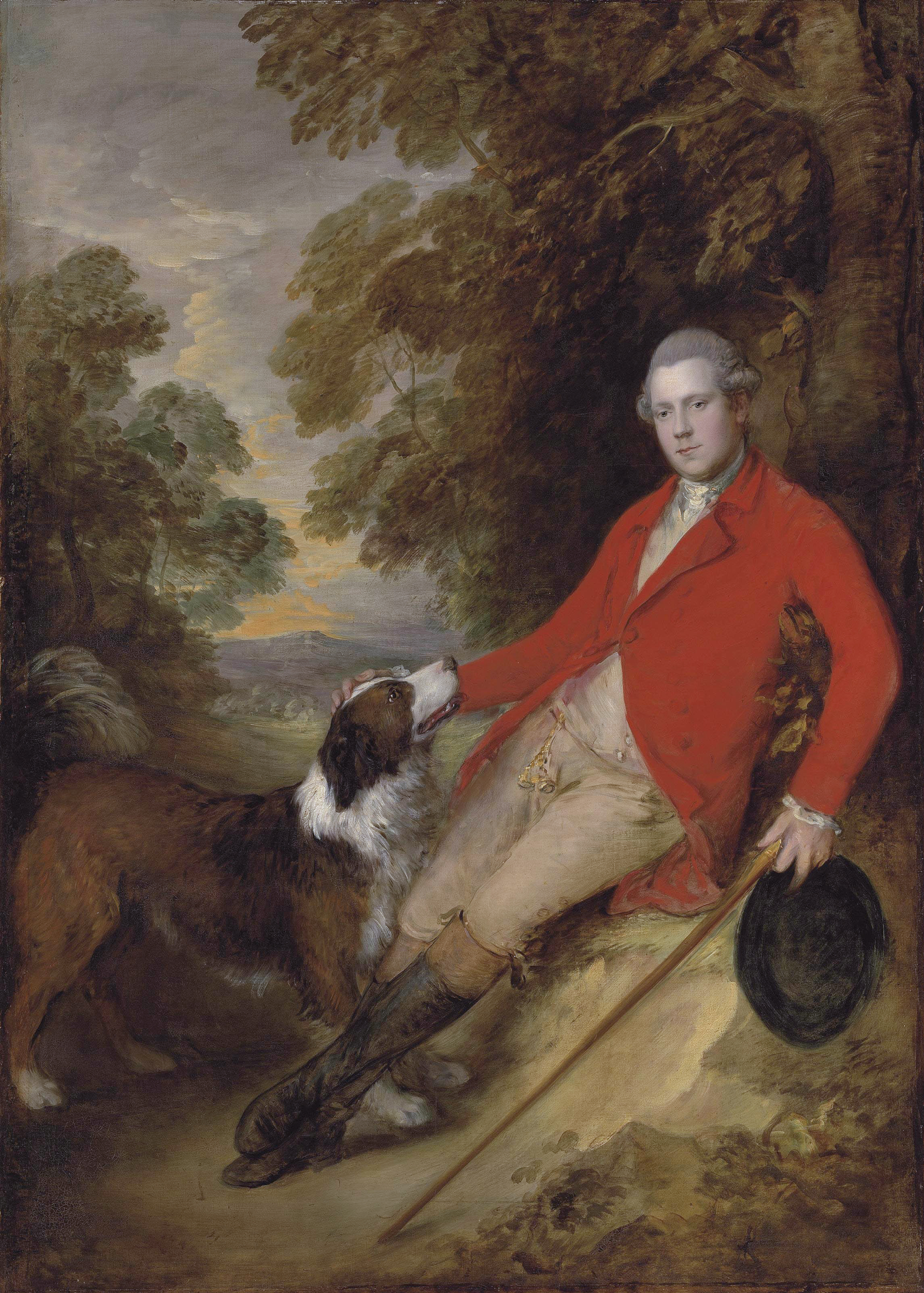
Thomas Gainsborough, Philip Stanhope, 5th Earl of Chesterfield, 1777 or 1778. 221 x 157.5 cm. Private collection since 1959

The portrait was held in the collection of the Stanhope family, passing by inheritance from its completion until 1923, when it was acquired by Henry Herbert, 6th Earl of Carnarvon. It was sold at Christie's, London, in May, 1925, to Sir John Leigh, along with the portrait of Philip. On Leigh's death in 1959 it went into the ownership of the art dealers Thomas Agnew & Sons, who in turn sold it to Jean Paul Getty in 1959.

Portrait of Anne, Countess of Chesterfield was again exhibited at the Royal Academy in 1887, and at the Royal House of Guelph in 1891. A mezzotint print copy was produced by the engraver James Scott in 1870, and is now in the National Portrait Gallery, London. Scott also copied Philip's portrait, using the same technique and material.

== Sources ==
- Brewer, David A. In a review of: Thomas Gainsborough and the Modern Woman by Benedict Leca, Aileen Ribeiro, Amber Ludwig. Eighteenth-Century Studies, VolUME 44, No. 4, pp. 569–572
- Impelluso, Lucia. Gardens in Art. Malibu, CA: Getty Publications, 2017. ISBN 978-0-8923-6885-3
- Fredericksen, Burton. Catalogue of the Paintings in the J. Paul Getty Museum. Malibu, CA: J. Paul Getty Museum, 1972
- Jaffé, David. Summary Catalogue of European Paintings in the J. Paul Getty Museum. Malibu, CA: J. Paul Getty Museum, 1977. ISBN 978-0-8923-6481-7
- Waterhouse, E.K. Preliminary check list of portraits by Thomas Gainsborough. The Volume of the Walpole Society, Volume 33, 1948-1950
