= Wojciech Rojowski =

Polish sculptor and woodcarver (died 1778)

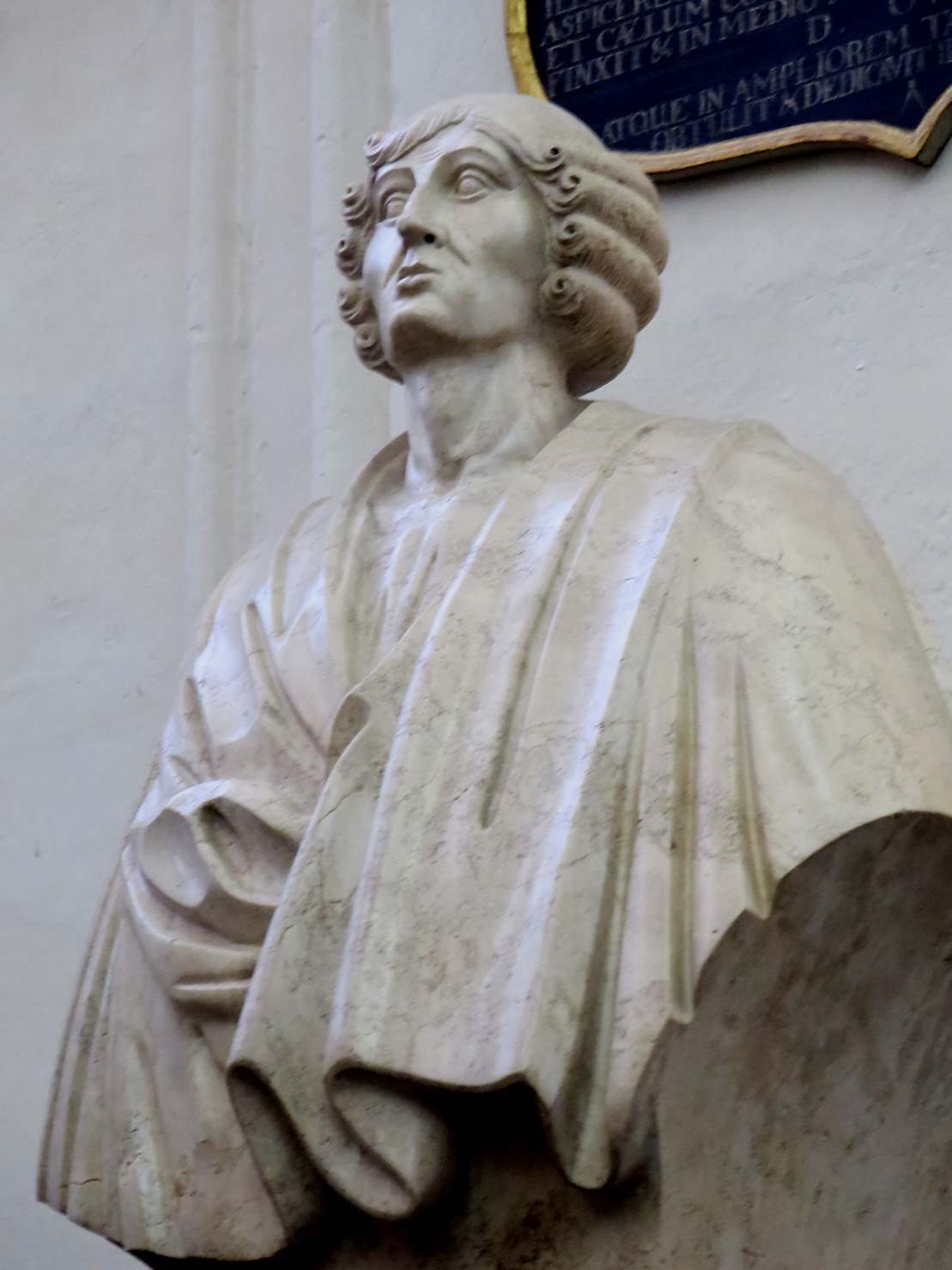
1766 Bust of Nicolaus Copernicus at St.Johns Cathedral, Toruń

Wojciech Rojowski (died 1778) was a Polish sculptor and woodcarver. His date of birth is not known. Information on the life Rojowski is scarce. He probably had a workshop in Kraków. He performed mainly sculptures and decorating the interior of churches in Kraków. He worked in stucco and wood in the Rococo style. His works are characterized by their richness of decoration. In 1750, he completed the stucco decoration of the altar of St. John of Nepomuk in the Pauline Church Na Skałce (On the Rock). From 1758 to 1766, he worked on the interior decoration of the Bernardine Church, Lviv. In addition, he participated in the work of such the Carmelite church, a church cloister in Bielany, and the Church of the Holy Sepulchre in Miechów. Rojowski also decorated the chapel of Bishop Andrzej Stanisław Załuski in the Wawel Cathedral, including a carved statue of the bishop. He was the creator of the Copernicus monument (1766), commissioned for the Town Hall of Toruń (predecessor to the later Nicolaus Copernicus Monument in Toruń).
