= Watson and the Shark =

Paintings by John Singleton Copley

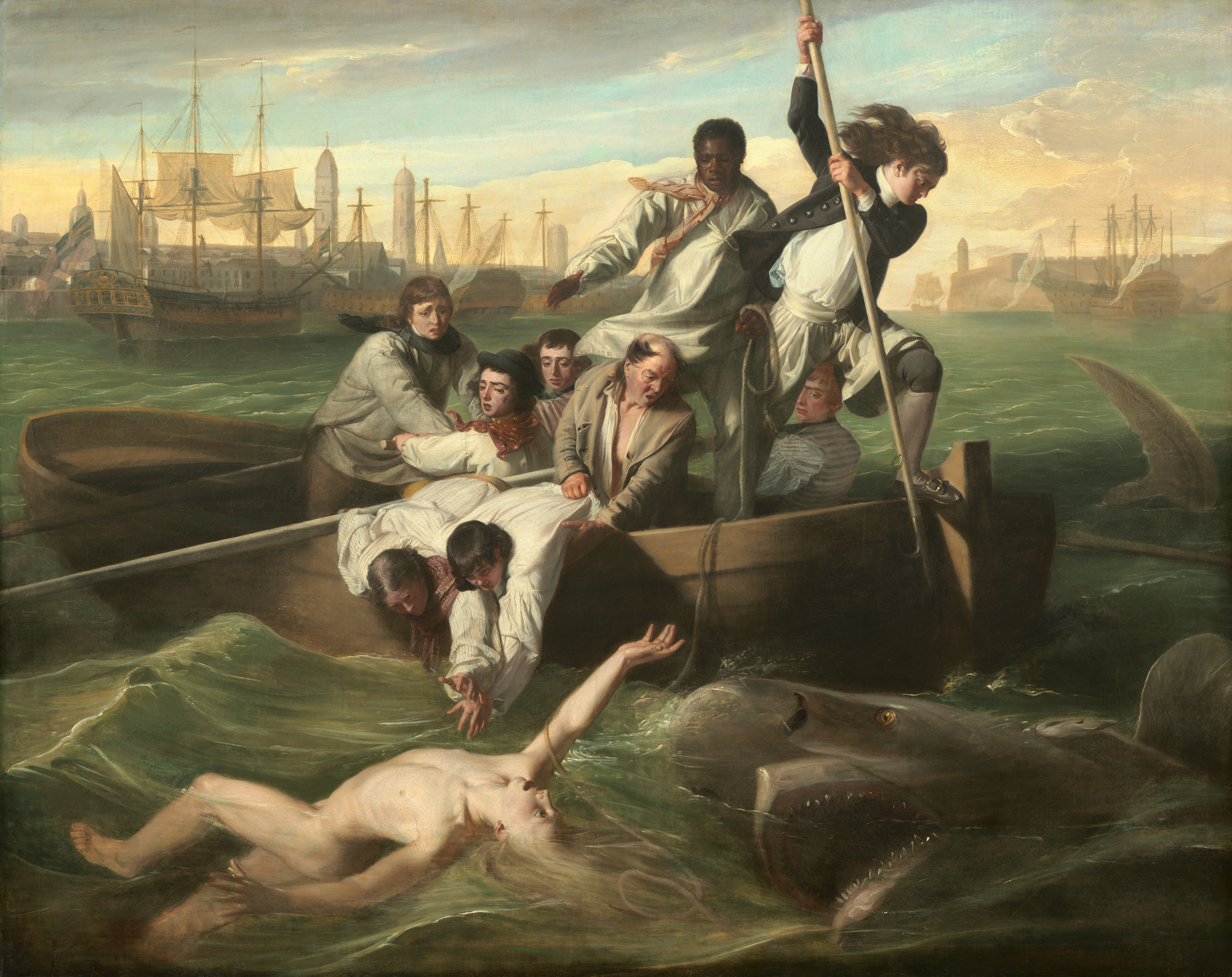
- Artist: John Singleton Copley
- Year: 1778
- Medium: Oil on canvas
- Dimensions: 180 cm × 230 cm (71 in × 91 in)
- Location: Museum of Fine Arts, Boston, MA

Watson and the Shark is an oil painting by the Anglo-American painter John Singleton Copley, depicting the rescue of the English boy Brook Watson from a shark attack in Havana, Cuba.

Copley, then living in London, painted three versions, which are all now in the United States. The 1778 version is in the National Gallery of Art, Washington, D.C. A second, full-size 1778 replica is now in the Museum of Fine Arts, Boston, and a third, smaller, 1782 version with a more vertical composition is in the Detroit Institute of Arts.

The paintings are based on an attack that took place in Havana Harbor in 1749. Brook Watson, then a 14-year-old cabin boy on the Royal Consort, lost his right leg below the knee in the attack, and was not rescued until the third attempt, which is the subject of the painting. Watson, having had a military career and become a successful merchant, commissioned the painting from Copley twenty-five years after the event. Watson went on to be chairman of Lloyd's of London, a Member of Parliament, and Lord Mayor of London.

== Painting ==
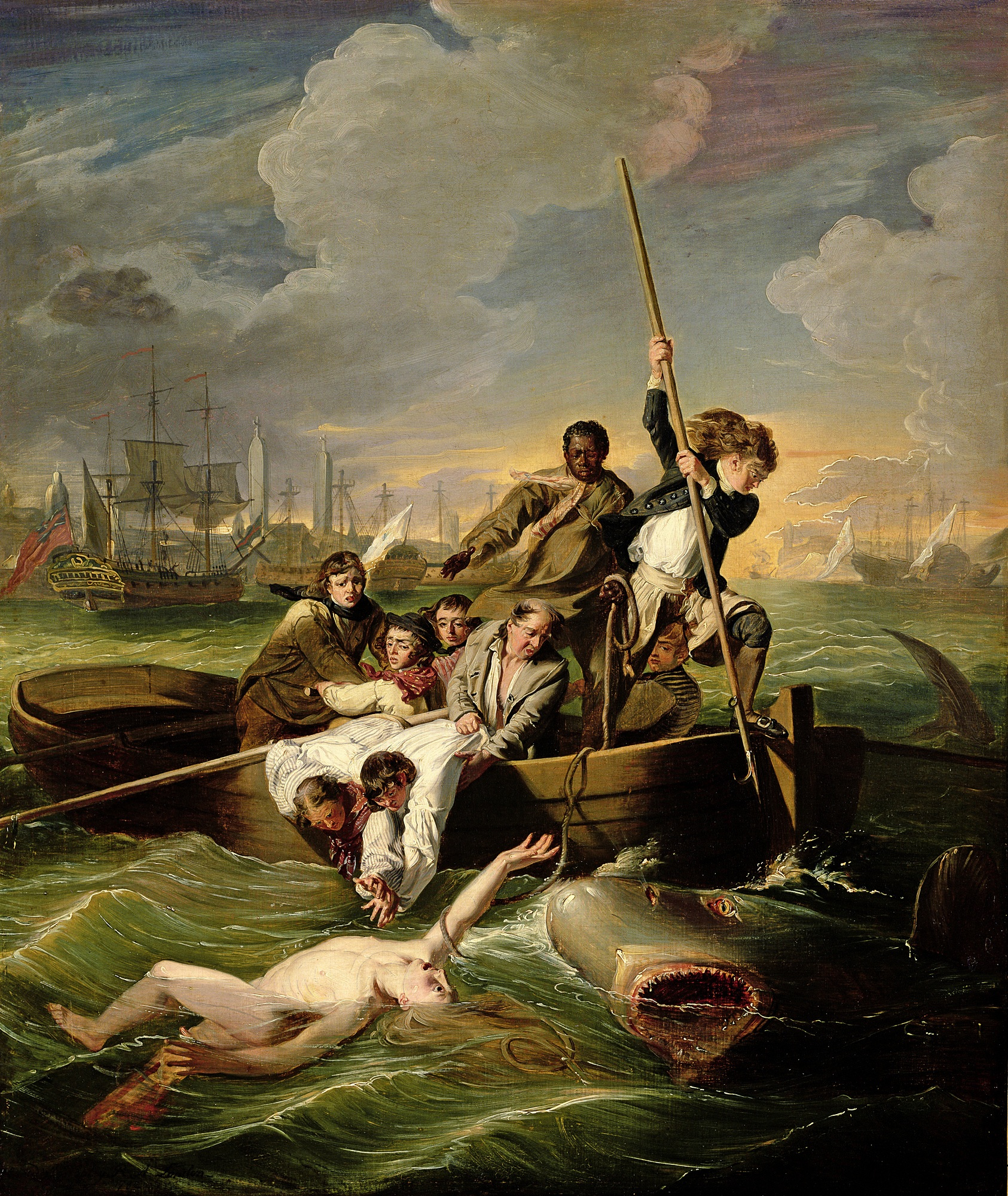
The third smaller version, now in the Detroit Institute of Arts, (1782, 91.4 cm/35.9 in x 77.5 cm/30.5 in) has a more vertical composition.

Copley and Brook Watson became friends after the American artist arrived in London in 1774. Watson commissioned him to create a painting of the 1749 event, and Copley produced three versions. It was the first of a series of large-scale historical paintings that Copley concentrated on after settling in London. The painting is romanticized: the gory detail of the injury is hidden beneath the waves, though there is a hint of blood in the water. The rescue attempt is led by a young man standing on the prow of the boat, poising to spear the animal through with a pike pole.

The figure of Watson is based on the statue of the "Borghese Gladiator", by Agasias of Ephesus, in the Louvre. Other apparent influences are Renaissance art, and the ancient statue of Laocoön and His Sons, which Copley may have seen in Rome. Copley was probably also influenced by Benjamin West's The Death of General Wolfe, and the growing popularity of romantic painting.

The composition of the rescuers in the boat shows hints of Peter Paul Rubens's Jonah Thrown into the Sea, and both Rubens's Miraculous Draught of Fishes and Raphael's painting of the same name. The facial expressions show a marked resemblance to those in Charles Le Brun's Conférence de M. Le Brun sur l'expression générale et particulière, an influential work published in 1698; they portray a range of emotions, from fear to courage. Various elements of composition were changed as the painting progressed. Infrared analysis shows that the old boatswain was originally a young man, and preliminary sketches reveal that the black sailor at the rear of the boat, who also appears as the subject of Copley's Head of a Negro painted around the same time, was originally envisioned as a white man with long, flowing hair.

Copley had never visited Havana, and it is likely that he had never seen a shark, much less one attacking a person. He may have gleaned details of Havana Harbor from prints and book illustrations: he includes the real landmark of Morro Castle in the background on the right. The shark is less convincing and includes anatomical features not found in sharks, such as lips, forward-facing eyes that resemble a tiger's more than a shark's and air blowing out from the animal's "nostrils".

The painting was exhibited at the Royal Academy in 1778. At his death in 1807, Watson bequeathed the painting to Christ's Hospital, with the hope that it would prove "a most usefull Lesson to Youth". In September 1819 the school's committee of almoners voted to accept the painting and place it in the great hall. The school later moved to Horsham, Sussex, where it was hung in the Dining Hall. In 1963, it sold the painting to the National Gallery of Art, Washington, D.C. though the college retains a copy.

The version in the National Gallery of Art features a panel beneath the painting which reads:

This picture representing a remarkable occurrence in the life of Brook Watson was bequeathed to the Royal Hospital of Christ in London by his will. He was of a very good family in the North of England but having lost both his parents early in life was brought up by an aunt, and before the age of fourteen years manifested a strong predilection for the sea, which led to the misfortune represented in the picture.

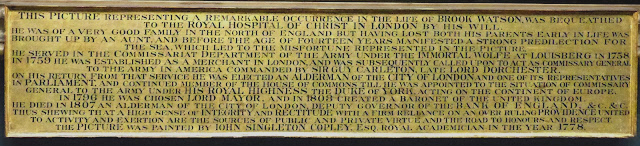
The panel beneath the painting describing the achievements of Brook Watson

He served in the Commissariat Department of the Army under the immortal Wolfe at Louisberg in 1758. In 1759 he was established as a merchant in London and was subsequently called upon to act as Commissary General to the Army in America commanded by Sir Guy Carleton, late Lord Dorchester.

On his return from that service he was elected an Alderman of the City of London and one of its representatives in parliament, and continued Member of the House of Commons till he was appointed to the situation of Commissary General to the Army under His Royal Highness the Duke of York, acting on the continent of Europe.

In 1796 he was chosen Lord Mayor and in 1803 created a baronet of the United Kingdom.

He died in 1807, an Alderman of the City of London, Deputy Governor of the Bank of England, &c, &c thus shewing that a high sense of integrity and rectitude with a firm reliance on an overruling providence united to activity and exertion are the sources of public and private virtue and the road to honours and respect. The picture was painted by John Singleton Copley Esq. Royal Academician in the year 1778.

Copley produced a second, full-size replica of the painting for himself in 1778. It was inherited by his son, and then passed through several English and American collections until it was donated in 1889 to the Museum of Fine Arts, Boston.

In 1782 Copley painted a third and smaller version of the painting, with a vertical format produced by extending the view of the sky above. It was owned first by Noël Desenfans. In 1946 it was purchased by the Detroit Institute of Arts.

The Metropolitan Museum of Art holds a study of the work by Copley.

The Beaverbrook Art Gallery (Fredericton, Canada) has a miniature version of this piece, attributed to Copley.
