= Portrait of Philip James de Loutherbourg =

Painting by Thomas Gainsborough

Philip James de Loutherbourg
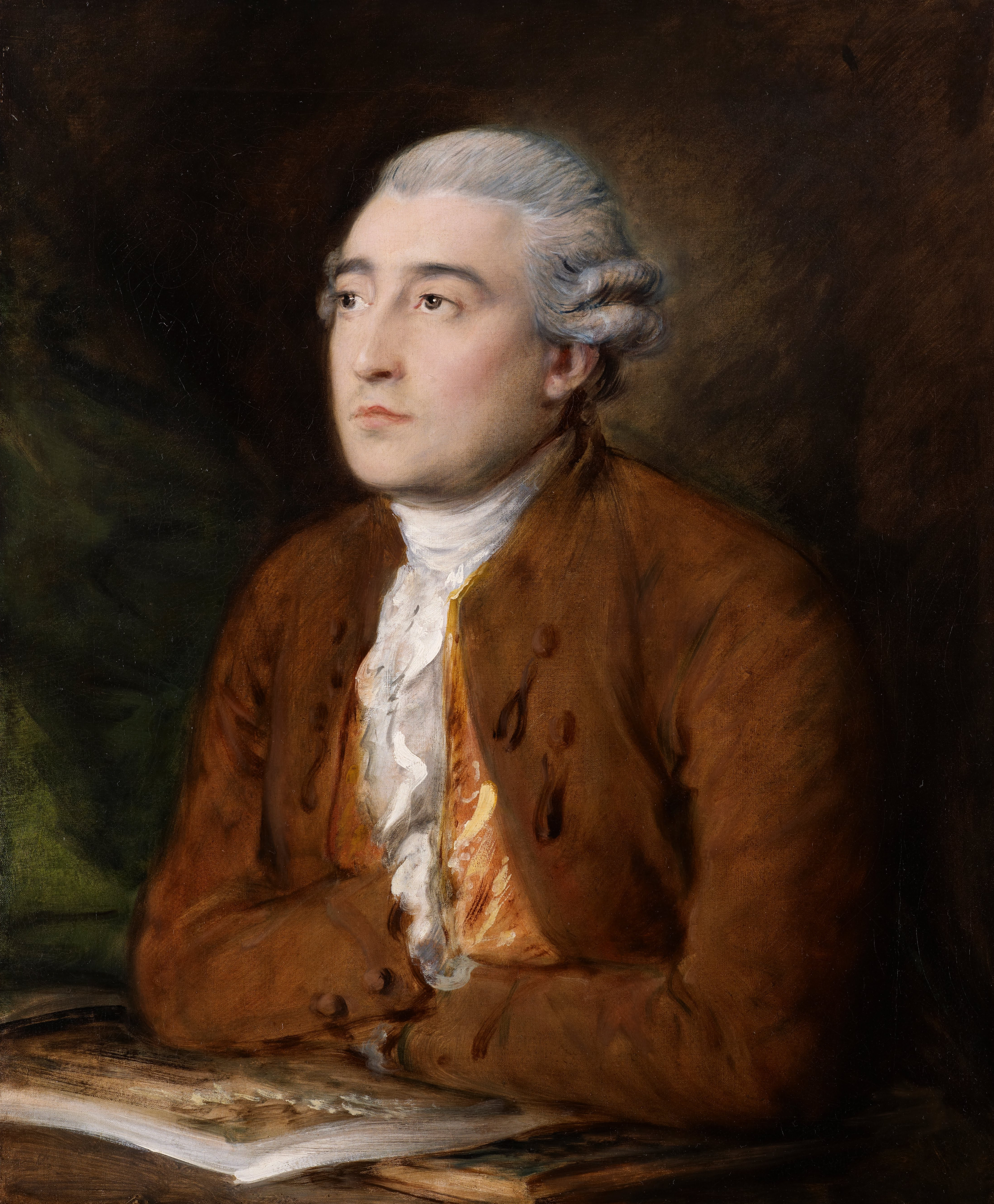
- Artist: Thomas Gainsborough
- Year: 1777–1778
- Type: Oil on canvas, portrait painting
- Dimensions: 76.5 cm × 63.2 cm (30.1 in × 24.9 in)
- Location: Dulwich Picture Gallery, London

Philip James de Loutherbourg is an oil on canvas portrait painting by the British artist Thomas Gainsborough, from 1777-1778. It depicts the French-born British painter and set designer Philippe Jacques de Loutherbourg, known in England by the English version of his name.

Born in Strasbourg, Loutherbourg settled in London in 1770 and became noted for his set designs at the Theatre Royal, Drury Lane as well as his landscape paintings, produced in an early romantic style. Gainsborough's portrait was displayed at the Royal Academy's Summer Exhibition of 1778 at Somerset House. It is held in of Dulwich Picture Gallery, in London, having been part of the Bourgeois Bequest in 1811. A later self-portrait by Loutherbourg it now in the National Portrait Gallery.

== Bibliography ==
- Hamilton, James. Gainsborough: A Portrait. Hachette UK, 2017.
- Murray, Christopher John. Encyclopedia of the Romantic Era, 1760-1850, Volume 2. Taylor & Francis, 2004.
- Rosenthal, Michael & Myrone, Martin. Thomas Gainsborough. Harry N. Abrams, 2002.
