= Portrait of James Christie =

Painting by Thomas Gainsborough

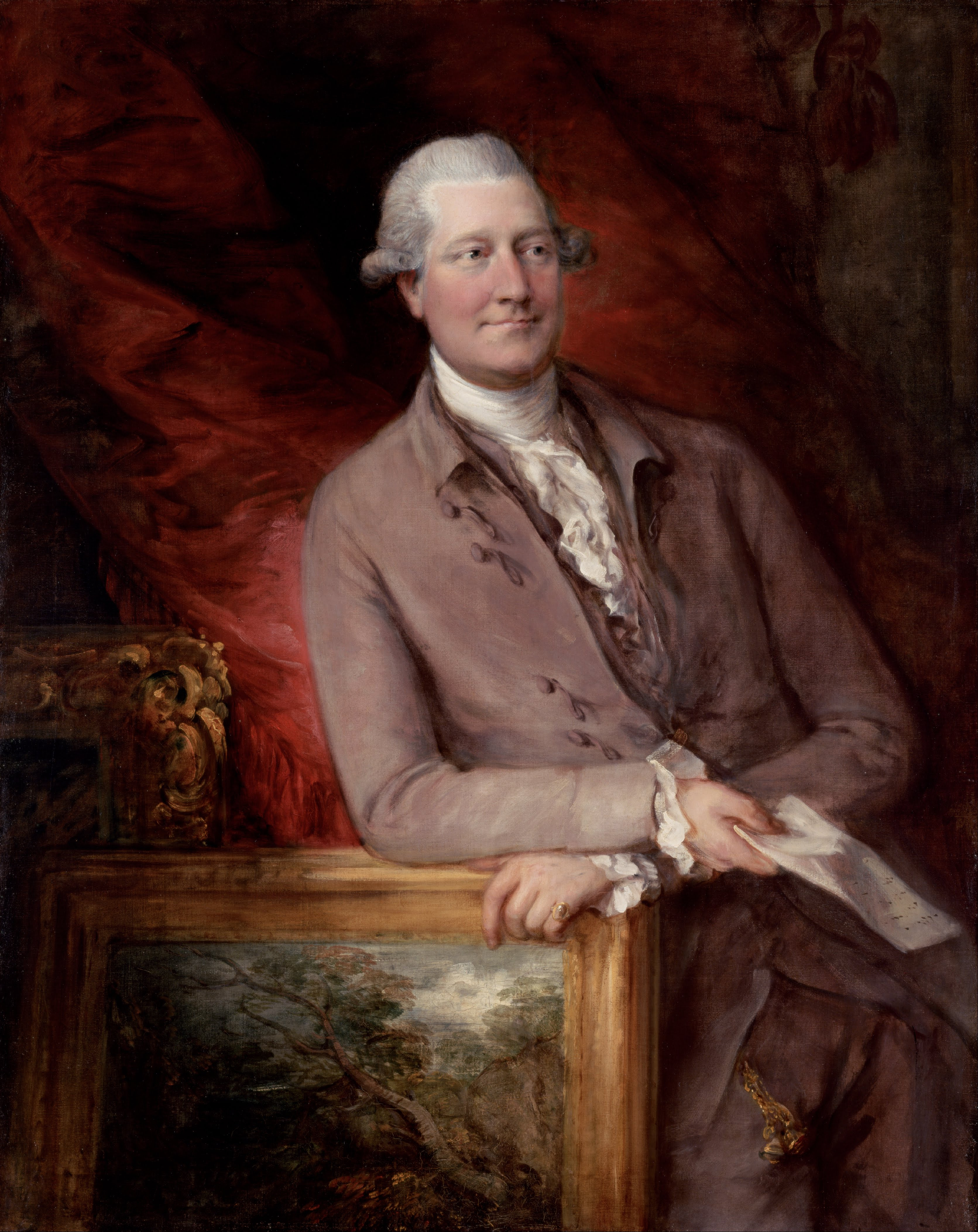
- Artist: Thomas Gainsborough
- Year: 1778
- Type: Oil on canvas, portrait painting
- Dimensions: 126 cm × 101.9 cm (50 in × 40.1 in)
- Location: J. Paul Getty Museum; Los Angeles

Portrait of James Christie is an oil on canvas portrait painting by the British artist Thomas Gainsborough, from 1778. It depicts the Scottish auctioneer James Christie, the founder of the London auction house Christie's.

A fashionable Society portraitist, Gainsborough had moved from Bath to London in 1774 and lived by Schomberg House close to Christie's auction house on Pall Mall. He depicts Christie in the fashionable dress of the era and leaning on the frame of a large landscape painting, likely to be one of Gainsborough's own.

It was one of twelve paintings that Gainsborough submitted to the Royal Academy 's Summer Exhibition that year.

The work hung for many years at Christie's premises. The painting was acquired by Art collector J. Paul Getty and is now in the collection of the Getty Museum, in Los Angeles.

== Bibliography ==
- Allan, Scott (ed.) Masterpieces of Painting: J. Paul Getty Museum. J. Paul Getty Museum, 2019.
- Hamilton, James. Gainsborough: A Portrait. Hachette UK, 2017.
- Huda, Shireen. Pedigree and Panache: A History of the Art Auction in Australia. ANU E Press, 2008.
