= The Marlborough Family =

Painting by Joshua Reynolds

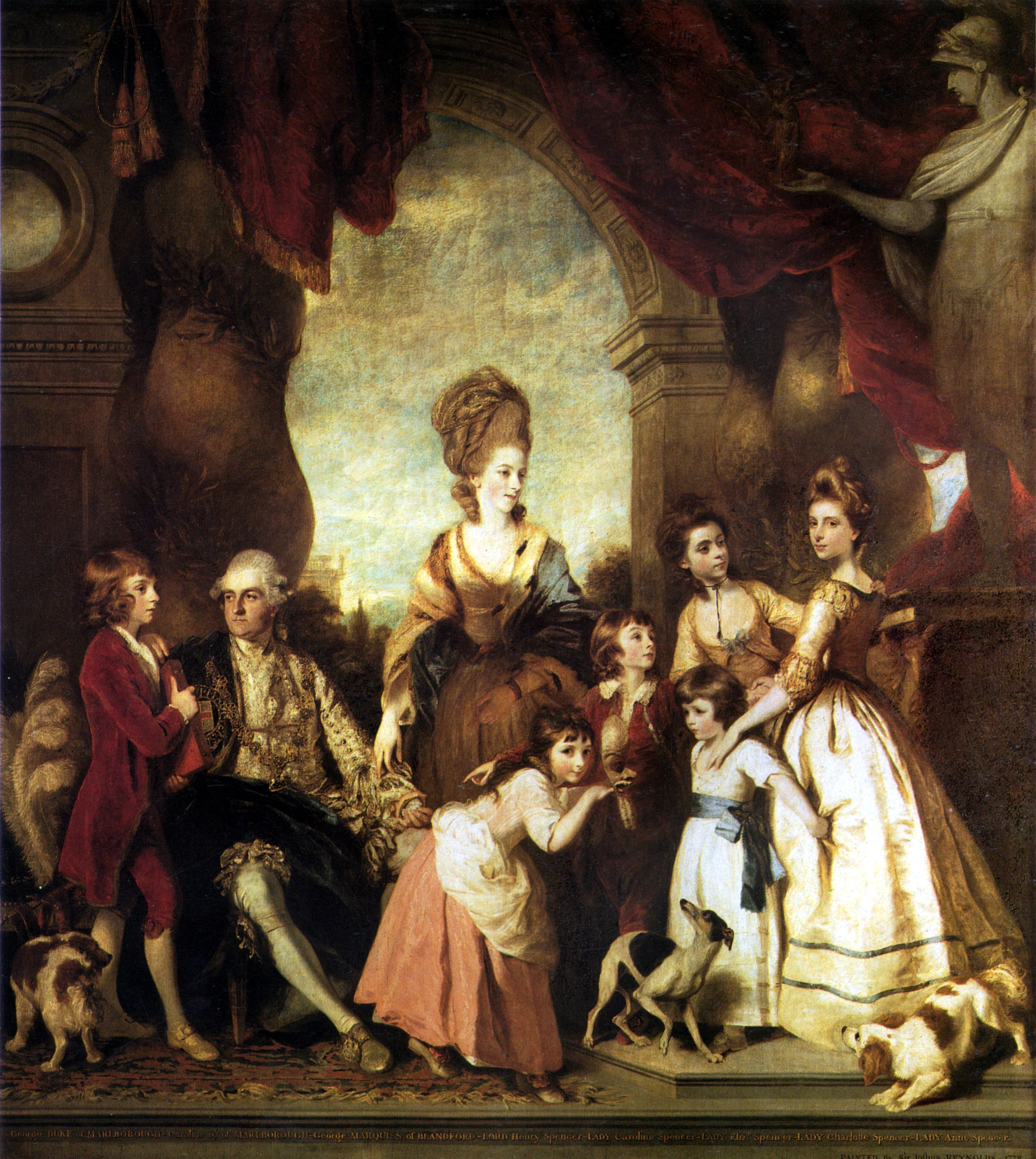
- Artist: Joshua Reynolds
- Year: 1777-1778
- Type: Oil on canvas, portrait painting
- Dimensions: 318 cm × 289 cm (125 in × 114 in)
- Location: Blenheim Palace; Oxfordshire

'The Marlborough Family is a 1778 large portrait painting by the British artist Joshua Reynolds. It is a group portrait of Fourth Duke of Marlborough, his wife the Duchess of Marlborough and their children including George, later the fifth Duke.

Reynolds was the president of the Royal Academy and leading British portrait painter of the era. With eight sitters, it was the most ambitious group painting he had so far attempted. He travelled to Blenheim Palace between 13 August and 4 September 1777, where he spent much of his time with sittings of the children. According to the young artist William Beechey the Duchesses mother the Duchess of Bedford was not impressed with the depiction of her daughter but Reynolds pretended not to hear because of his well-known deafness.

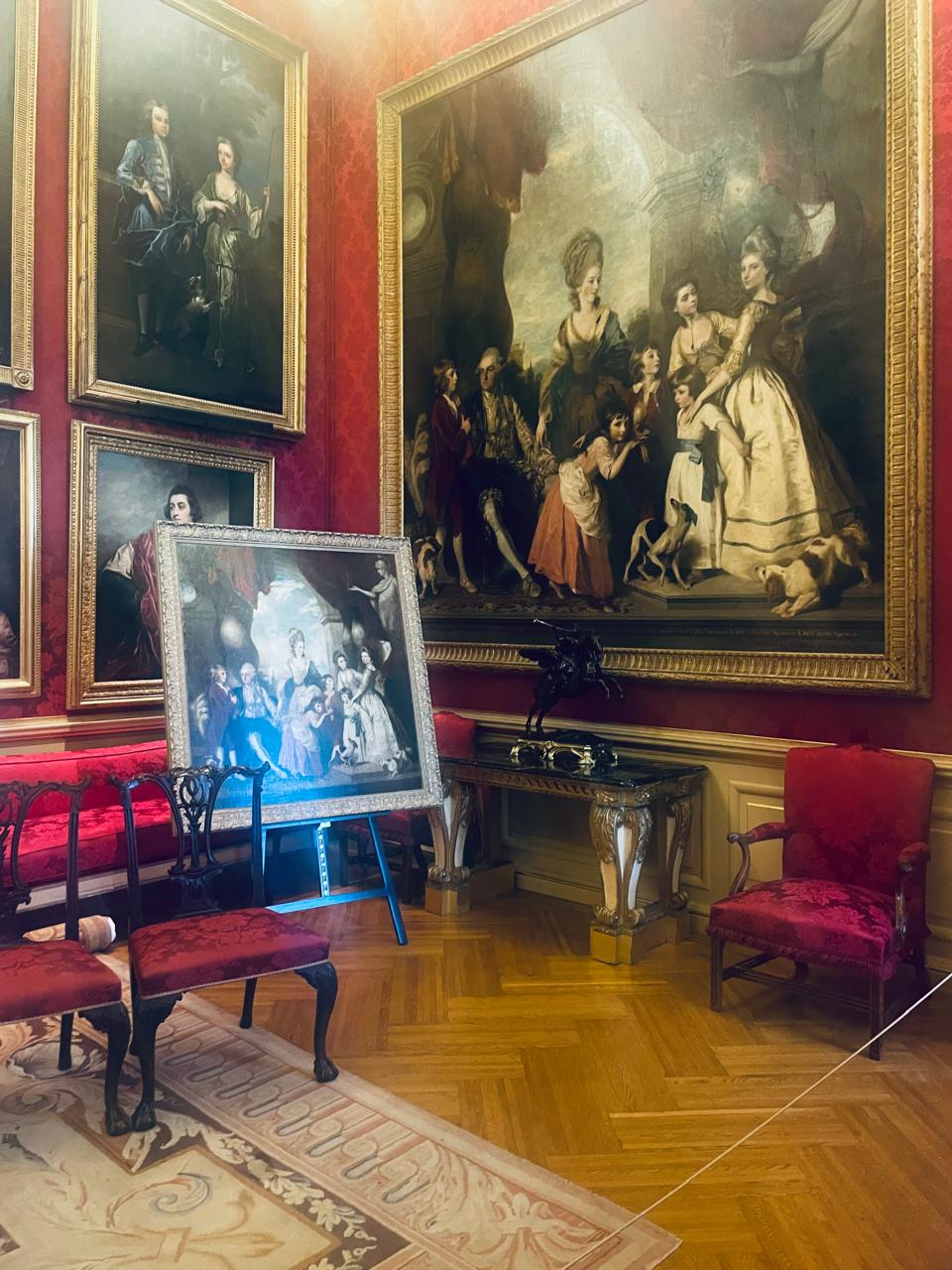
The Marlborough Family in situ at Blenheim Palace

The painting was displayed at the Royal Academy's Summer Exhibition of 1778 at Pall Mall. A review of in the Morning Post praised it for its variation in poses of the sitters, but was critical of its "absurdly indiscriminate" use of light and shade. Later reviews have been more favourable with the art historian Ellis Waterhouse praised it as landmark in British portrait painting. Today the work remains in the collection of the Marlborough family at Blenheim Palace in Oxfordshire.

== Bibliography ==
- McIntyre, Ian. Joshua Reynolds: The Life and Times of the First President of the Royal Academy. Allen Lane, 2003.
- Postle, Edward (ed.) Joshua Reynolds: The Creation of Celebrity. Harry N. Abrams, 2005.
- Russell, Gillian. Women, Sociability and Theatre in Georgian London. Cambridge University Press, 2007.
- Wendorf, Richard. Sir Joshua Reynolds: The Painter in Society. Harvard University Press, 1998.
