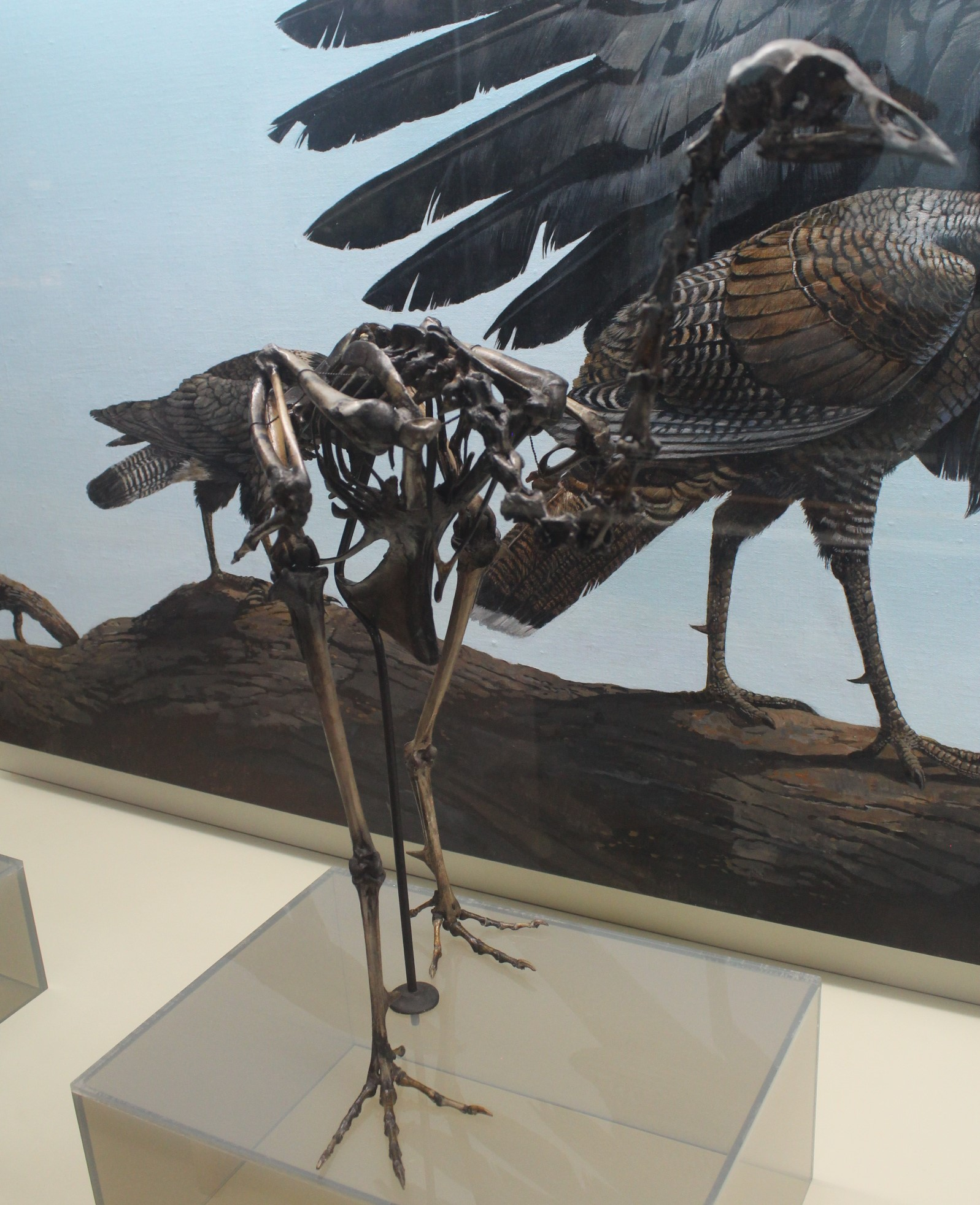
- Skeleton on display in the Page Museum at the La Brea Tar Pits

Scientific classification
- Kingdom: Animalia
- Phylum: Chordata
- Class: Aves
- Order: Galliformes
- Family: Phasianidae
- Genus: Meleagris
- Species: †M. californica

Binomial name
- †Meleagris californica (Miller, 1909)

= Californian turkey =

California turkey Temporal range: Pleistocene - Early Holocene

Extinct species of bird

The Californian turkey (Meleagris californica) is an extinct species of turkey that lived during the Pleistocene and Early Holocene epochs in California. It has been estimated that the Californian turkey went extinct about 10,000 years ago.

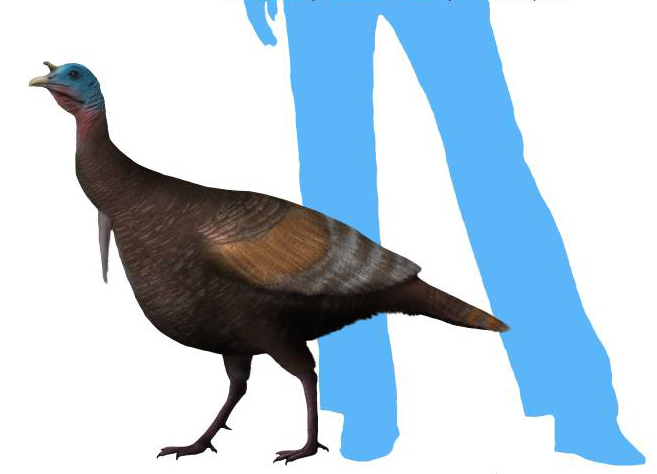
Restoration

Fossil evidence indicates that the Californian turkey was stockier than the wild turkey of the eastern United States, with a shorter, wider beak, but was largely similar otherwise. It is a very common fossil in the La Brea Tar Pits. Size-wise, though, the California turkey might have been intermediate in size between the smaller southwestern turkey (Meleagris crassipes) and the larger North American wild turkey (Meleagris gallopavo).

The extinction of this species is thought to have been caused by a combination of drought, which would have forced turkeys to restrict their lives to areas close to water sources, and overhunting by humans who had arrived relatively recently in the region.

This species was originally described as a type of peafowl by Miller in 1909 and placed in the genus Pavo with that bird.

== Distribution and origin ==
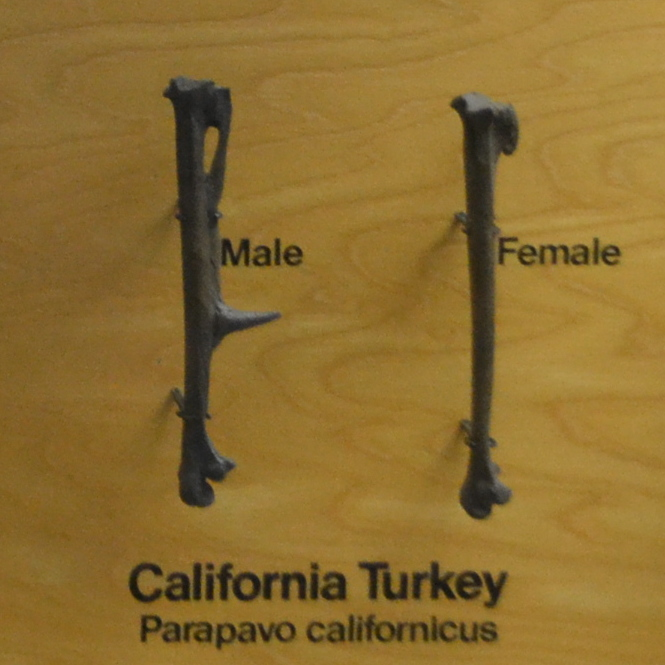
Tarsometatarsals, showing the male's spur

"The unquestionable geographic range of M. californica extended from Orange County in the south (Imperial Highway), through Los Angeles County (Rancho La Brea and probably also Workman and Alhambra Streets), to Santa Barbara County in the north (Carpinteria)."

During the Miocene, Californian turkeys probably originated from other turkey populations that have become restricted to southern California. However, the similarities between the Californian and wild turkey suggest the former, following isolation of their ancestors, may have faced similar evolutionary pressures when compared to their mainland relatives.

The xeric desert topography that prevails now in southeastern California and western Arizona may have prevented the Californian turkey and its neighbor, the wild turkey, from exchanging genes with one another. This would therefore indicate the California turkey has been an isolated species separated from the more abundant wild turkey for some time before their extinction.
