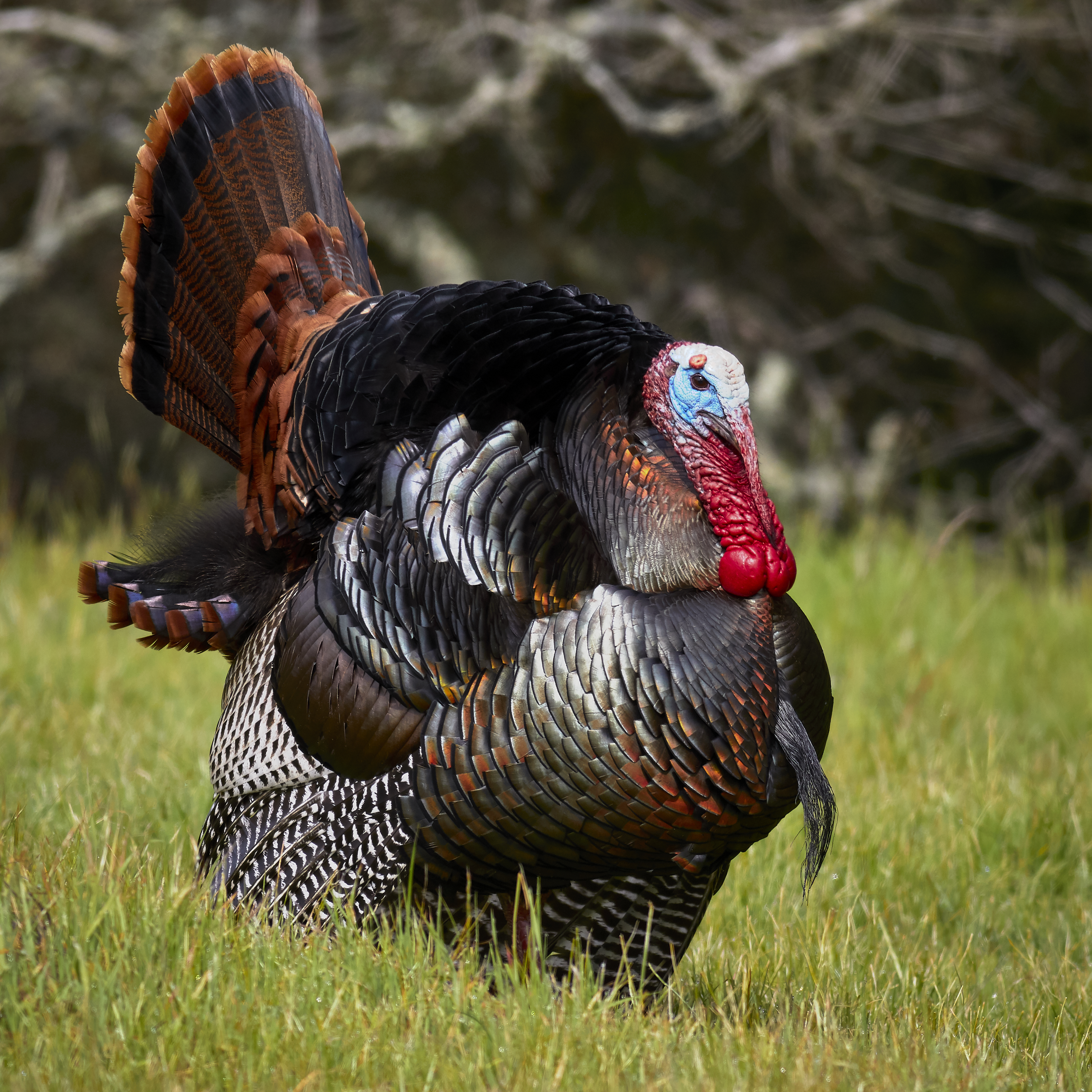
- A male Eastern wild turkey strutting

Scientific classification
- Kingdom: Animalia
- Phylum: Chordata
- Class: Aves
- Order: Galliformes
- Family: Phasianidae
- Subfamily: Phasianinae
- Tribe: Tetraonini
- Genus: Meleagris; Linnaeus, 1758

Type species
- Meleagris gallopavo (wild turkey) Linnaeus, 1758

Species
- M. gallopavo; M. ocellata; †M. californica; †M. crassipes

= Turkey (bird) =

Turkey Temporal range: 23–0 Ma Early Miocene – Recent

North American genus of large birds

Turkeys are large, heavyset galliforms in the genus Meleagris, indigenous to the Americas. They are among the largest birds in their native ranges, as well as being one of the heaviest birds in the order Galliformes. There are two extant turkey species: the wild turkey (Meleagris gallopavo) of Southern, Central and Eastern North America, and the ocellated turkey (Meleagris ocellata) of the Yucatán Peninsula in Mexico. Males of both species have a distinctive singular fleshy wattle, called a snood, that hangs from the base of the culmen. Like with other phasianines, the male is bigger and sports fancier plumage than the female.

The earliest turkeys evolved in North America over 20 million years ago. They share a recent common ancestor with grouse, pheasants, and other fowl. The North American wild turkey is the ancestor of the domestic turkey, which was domesticated approximately 2,000 years ago by indigenous peoples. It was this domestic descendant that was later transported by humans to Eurasia, during the Columbian exchange.

== Name ==
Plate 1 of The Birds of America by John James Audubon, depicting a wild turkey

The name turkey originated as a shortening of turkey cock and turkey hen and initially denoted the guineafowl, an African bird to which the turkeys of North America are only distantly related. Guineafowl were first imported to Europe via Turkey, hence the name. Following the establishment of English colonies in the New World, the name was transferred to the superficially similar North American bird.

In languages such as French, the bird was named after India. The bird was originally called poule d'inde or chicken of India later becoming dinde.

In languages in Northern Europe such as Norwegian, Swedish, and Estonian, the bird was named after Calicut, India (now Kozhikode, India).

In 1550, the English navigator William Strickland, who had introduced the turkey into England, was granted a coat of arms including a "turkey-cock in his pride proper". William Shakespeare used the term in Twelfth Night, believed to be written in 1601 or 1602. The lack of context around his usage suggests that the term was already widespread.

An infant turkey is called a chick or poult.

== Taxonomy ==
Live turkeys

The genus Meleagris was introduced in 1758 by the Swedish naturalist Carl Linnaeus in the tenth edition of his Systema Naturae. The genus name is from the Ancient Greek μελεαγρις, meleagris meaning "guineafowl". The type species is the wild turkey (Meleagris gallopavo).

Turkeys are classed in the family Phasianidae (pheasants, partridges, francolins, junglefowl, grouse, and relatives thereof) in the taxonomic order Galliformes. They are close relatives of the grouse and are classified alongside them in the tribe Tetraonini.

=== Extant species ===
The genus contains two species.

Genus Meleagris – Linnaeus, 1758 – two species
Common name	Scientific name and subspecies	Range	Size and ecology	IUCN status and estimated population
Wild turkey and domestic turkey Male Female named Zelda	Meleagris gallopavo Linnaeus, 1758 Six subspecies: M. g. silvestris (Vieillot, 1817); M. g. osceola (Scott, 1890); M. g. intermedia (Sennett, 1879); M. g. merriami (Nelson, 1900); M. g. mexicana (Gould, 1856); M. g. gallopavo (Linnaeus, 1758)	The forests of North America, from Mexico (where they were first domesticated in Mesoamerica) throughout the midwestern and eastern United States and into southeastern Canada	Size: Habitat: Diet:	LC
Ocellated turkey Male Female	Meleagris ocellata Cuvier, 1820	The forests of the Yucatán Peninsula, Mexico	Size: Habitat: Diet:	NT

=== Fossil species ===
- Meleagris californica Californian turkey – Southern California
- Meleagris crassipes Southwestern turkey - New Mexico

== History ==
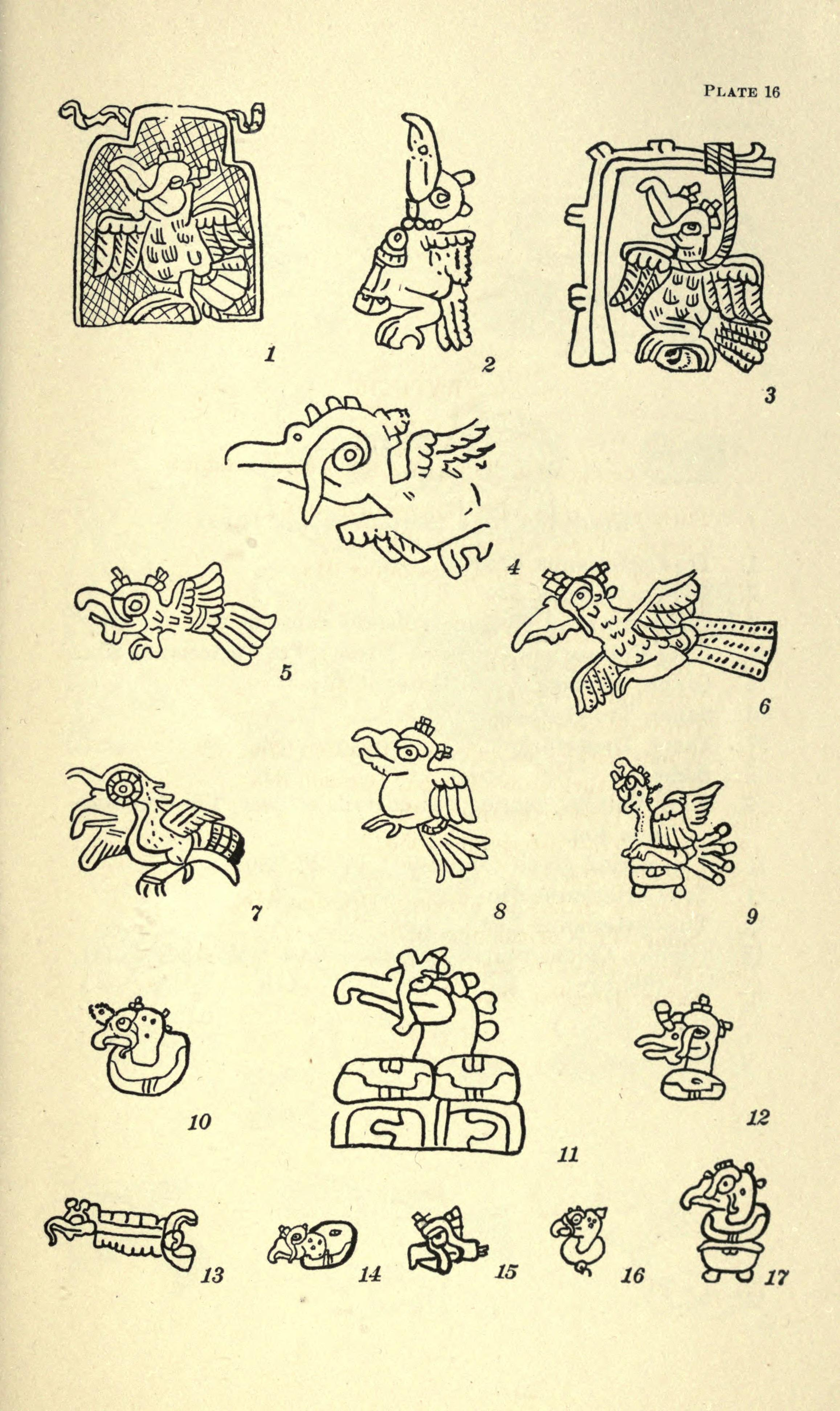
Depiction of ocellated turkeys in Maya codices according to the 1910 book, Animal figures in the Maya codices by Alfred Tozzer and Glover Morrill Allen

Turkeys were likely first domesticated in Pre-Columbian Mexico, where they held a cultural and symbolic importance. The Classical Nahuatl word for the turkey, huehxōlō-tl (guajolote in Spanish), is still used in modern Mexico, in addition to the general term pavo. Mayan aristocrats and priests appear to have had a special connection to ocellated turkeys, with ideograms of those birds appearing in Mayan manuscripts. Spanish chroniclers, including Bernal Díaz del Castillo and Father Bernardino de Sahagún, describe the multitude of food (both raw fruits and vegetables as well as prepared dishes) that were offered in the vast markets (tianguis) of Tenochtitlán, noting there were tamales made of turkeys, iguanas, chocolate, vegetables, fruits and more.

Turkeys were first exported to Europe via Spain around 1519, where they gained immediate popularity among the aristocratic classes. Turkeys arrived in England in 1541. From there, English settlers brought turkeys to North America during the 17th century.

=== Destruction and re-introduction in the United States ===
In what is now the United States, there were an estimated 10 million wild turkeys in the 17th century. By the 1930s, only 30,000 remained. In the 1960s and 1970s, biologists started trapping wild turkeys from the few places they remained (including the Ozarks and New York), and re-introducing them into other states, including Minnesota and Vermont. Starting in 2014, researchers sent a survey to wildlife biologists in the National Wild Turkey Federation Technical Committee across the U.S. states to gather data regarding the population of turkeys. As of 2019, the wild turkey population declined by around 3% since 2014. Also as of 2019, the number of wild turkey hunters decreased by 18% since 2014 from the reports of the participating U.S. states. The 2019 data for population was missing information from 12 states and the 2019 hunter data was missing information from 8 states.

== Human conflicts with wild turkeys ==
Turkeys have been known to be aggressive toward humans and pets in residential areas. Wild turkeys have a social structure and pecking order and habituated turkeys may respond to humans and animals as they do to other turkeys. Habituated turkeys may attempt to dominate or attack people that the birds view as subordinates.

In Brookline, Massachusetts, the 30,000 turkeys have become so prominent that they are considered to be the town's unofficial mascot. While some residents find them charming, others have experienced problems with aggressive behavior, particularly during mating season. Brookline has even installed turkey statues around town as part of a public art project. In 2017, Brookline recommended a controversial approach when confronted by wild turkeys. Besides taking a step forward to intimidate the birds, officials also suggested "making noise (clanging pots or other objects together); popping open an umbrella; shouting and waving your arms; squirting them with a hose; allowing your leashed dog to bark at them; and forcefully fending them off with a broom". This advice was quickly rescinded and replaced with a caution that "being aggressive toward wild turkeys is not recommended by State wildlife officials".

== Fossil record ==
A number of turkeys have been described from fossils. The Meleagridinae are known from the Early Miocene (c. 23 mya) onwards, with the extinct genera Rhegminornis (Early Miocene of Bell, U.S.) and Proagriocharis (Kimball Late Miocene/Early Pliocene of Lime Creek, U.S.). The former is probably a basal turkey, the other a more contemporary bird not very similar to known turkeys; both were much smaller birds. A turkey fossil not assignable to genus but similar to Meleagris is known from the Late Miocene of Westmoreland County, Virginia.

In the modern genus Meleagris, a considerable number of species have been described, as turkey fossils are robust and fairly often found, and turkeys show great variation among individuals. Many of these supposed fossilized species are now considered junior synonyms. One, the well-documented California turkey Meleagris californica, became extinct recently enough to have been hunted by early human settlers. It has been suggested that its demise was due to the combined pressures of human hunting and climate change at the end of the last glacial period.

The Oligocene fossil Meleagris antiquus was first described by Othniel Charles Marsh in 1871. It has since been reassigned to the genus Paracrax, first interpreted as a cracid, then soon after as a bathornithid Cariamiformes.

=== Fossil species ===
- Meleagris sp. (Early Pliocene of Bone Valley, U.S.)
- Meleagris sp. (Late Pliocene of Macasphalt Shell Pit, U.S.)
- Meleagris californica (Late Pleistocene of southwestern U.S.) – formerly Parapavo/Pavo
- Meleagris crassipes (Late Pleistocene of southwestern North America)

Turkeys have been considered by many authorities to be their own family—the Meleagrididae—but a 2007 genomic analysis of a retrotransposon marker groups turkeys in the family Phasianidae. In 2010, a team of scientists published a draft sequence of the domestic turkey (Meleagris gallopavo) genome. In 2023 a new improved haplotype-resolved domestic turkey genome was published, which confirmed the large inversion on the Z chromosome not found in other Galliformes, and found new structural variations between the parent haplotypes that provides potential new target genes for breeding.

== Anatomy ==
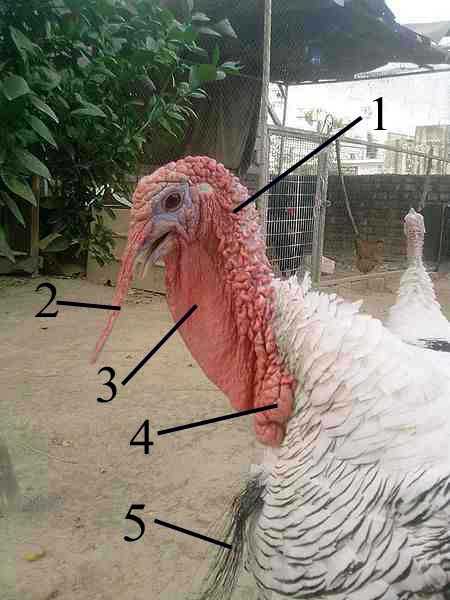
Anatomical structures on the head and throat of a domestic turkey. 1. caruncles, 2. snood, 3. wattle (dewlap), 4. major caruncle, 5. beard

In anatomical terms, a snood is an erectile, fleshy protuberance on the forehead of turkeys. Most of the time when the turkey is in a relaxed state, the snood is pale and 2–3 cm long. However, when the male begins strutting (the courtship display), the snood engorges with blood, becomes redder and elongates several centimeters, hanging well below the beak (see image).

Snoods are just one of the caruncles (small, fleshy excrescences) that can be found on turkeys.

While fighting, commercial turkeys often peck and pull at the snood, causing damage and bleeding. This often leads to further injurious pecking by other turkeys and sometimes results in cannibalism. To prevent this, some farmers cut off the snood when the chick is young, a process known as "de-snooding".

The snood can be between 3 and 15 centimetres (1 and 6 in) in length depending on the turkey's sex, health, and mood.

=== Function ===
The snood functions in both intersexual and intrasexual selection. Captive female wild turkeys prefer to mate with long-snooded males, and during dyadic interactions, male turkeys defer to males with relatively longer snoods. These results were demonstrated using both live males and controlled artificial models of males.

Data on the parasite burdens of free-living wild turkeys revealed a negative correlation between snood length and infection with intestinal coccidia, deleterious protozoan parasites. This indicates that in the wild, the long-snooded males preferred by females and avoided by males seemed to be resistant to coccidial infection. Scientists also conducted a study on 500 male turkeys, gathering data on their snood lengths and blood samples for immune system functionality. They discovered a similar negative correlation. The presence of more red blood cells when the snood is not removed will help to fight off unwanted invaders in their immune system, explaining this trend.

== Behavior ==
A turkey in a petting zoo in Japan

=== Feeding ===
Wild turkeys feed on various wildlife, depending on the season. In the warmer months of spring and summer, their diet consists mainly of grains such as wheat, corn, and of smaller animals such as grasshoppers, spiders, worms, and lizards. In the colder months of fall and winter, wild turkeys consume smaller fruits and nuts such as grapes, blueberries, acorns, and walnuts. To find this food, they have to continuously forage and feed most during the sunrise and sunset hours.

Domesticated turkeys consume a commercially produced feed formulated to increase the size of the turkeys. To supplement their nutrition, farmers will also feed them grains that wild turkeys eat, such as corn.

=== Grooming ===
Turkeys participate in a number of grooming behaviors including: dusting, sunning, and feather preening. In dusting, turkeys get low on their stomach or side and flap their wings, coating themselves with dirt. This action serves to remove debris build-up on the feathers and also clog tiny pores that parasites such as lice can inhabit. Sunning for turkeys involves bathing in the sunlight, for their top and bottom halves. This can serve to liquidate the oil that turkeys naturally produce, spreading over their feathers and dry their feathers from precipitation at the same time. In feather preening, turkeys are able to remove dirt and bacteria, while also ensuring that non-durable feathers are removed.

=== Flight ===
Though domestic turkeys are considered flightless, wild turkeys can and do fly for short distances. Turkeys are best adapted for walking and foraging; they do not fly as a normal means of travel. When faced with a perceived danger, wild turkeys can fly up to a quarter mile. Turkeys may also make short flights to assist roosting in a tree.

== Use by humans ==
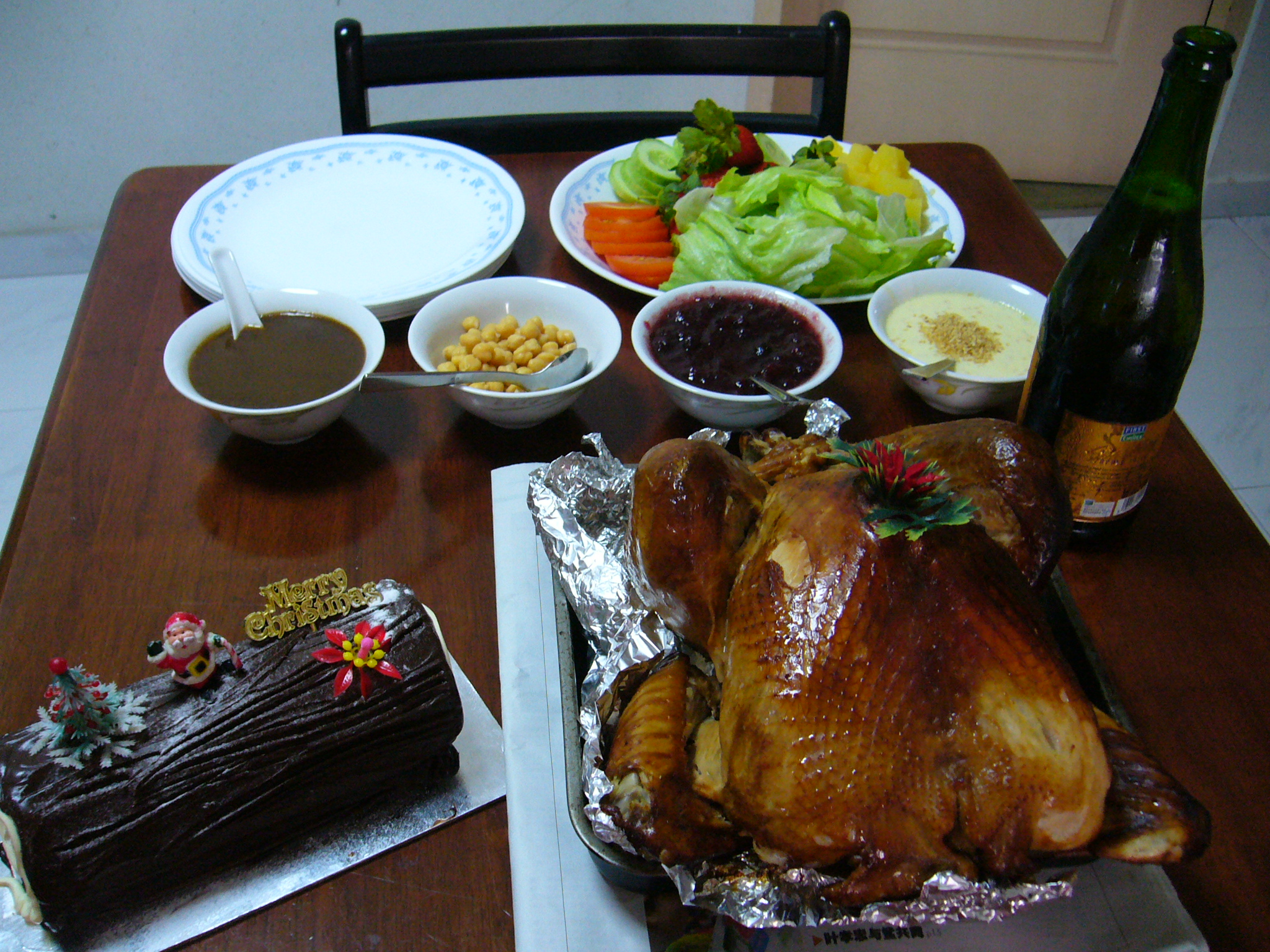
A roast turkey surrounded by a Christmas log cake, gravy, sparkling apple cider and vegetables

The species Meleagris gallopavo is eaten by humans. They were first domesticated by the indigenous people of Mexico from at least 800 BC onwards. By 200 BC, the indigenous people of what is today the American Southwest had domesticated turkeys; though the theory that they were introduced from Mexico was once influential, modern studies suggest that the turkeys of the Southwest were domesticated independently from those in Mexico. Turkeys were used both as a food source and for their feathers and bones, which were used in both practical and cultural contexts. Compared to wild turkeys, domestic turkeys are selectively bred to grow larger in size for their meat.

Turkey forms a central part of modern Thanksgiving celebrations in the United States of America, and is often eaten at similar holiday occasions, such as Christmas.

=== The Norfolk turkeys ===
In her memoirs, Lady Dorothy Nevill (1826–1913) recalls that her great-grandfather Horatio Walpole, 1st Earl of Orford (1723–1809), imported a quantity of American turkeys which were kept in the woods around Wolterton Hall and in all probability were the embryo flock for the popular Norfolk turkey breeds of today.

== Gallery ==
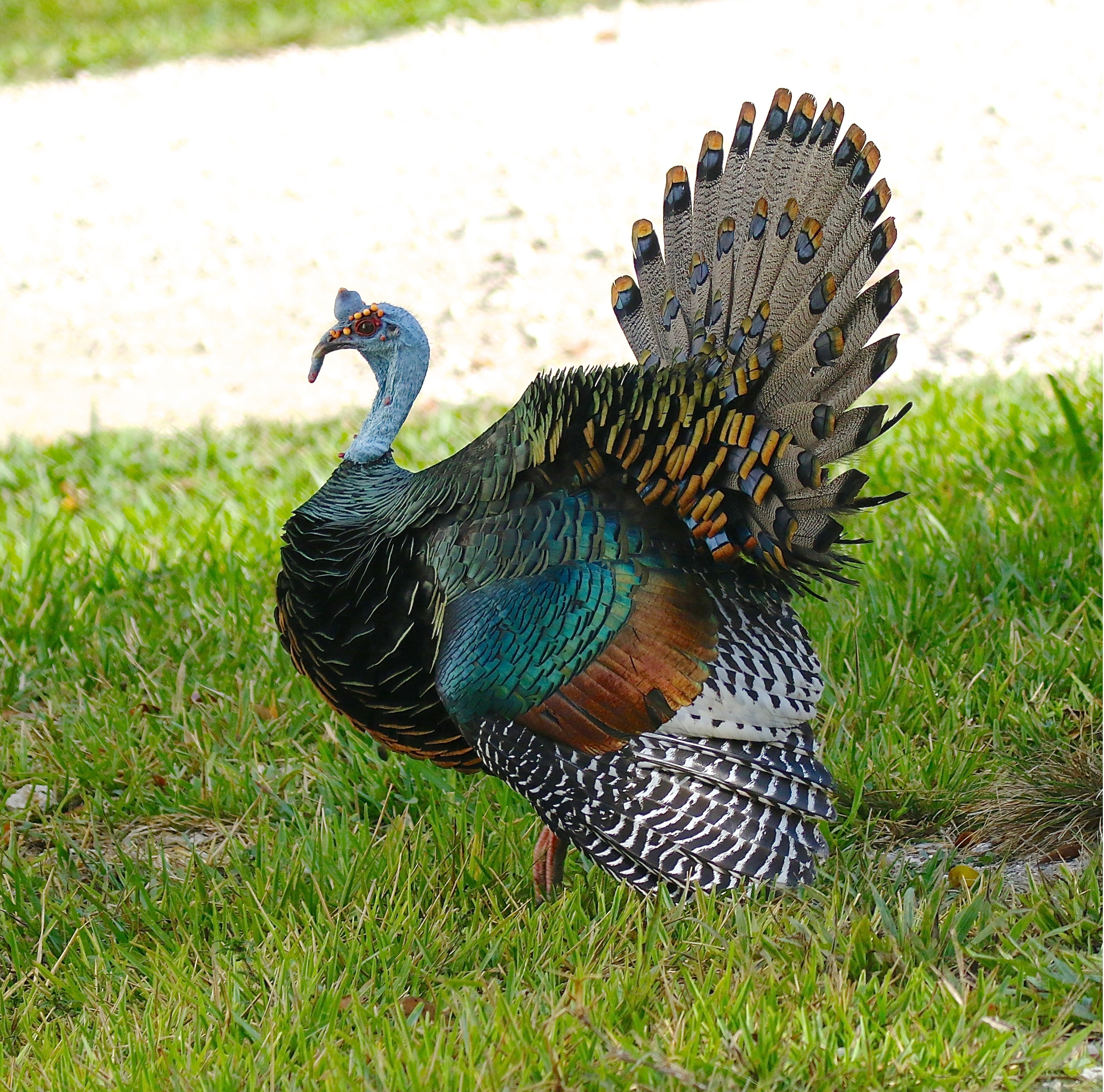
Chan Chich Lodge area, Belize: the ocellated turkey is named for the eye-shaped spots (ocelli) on its tail feathers

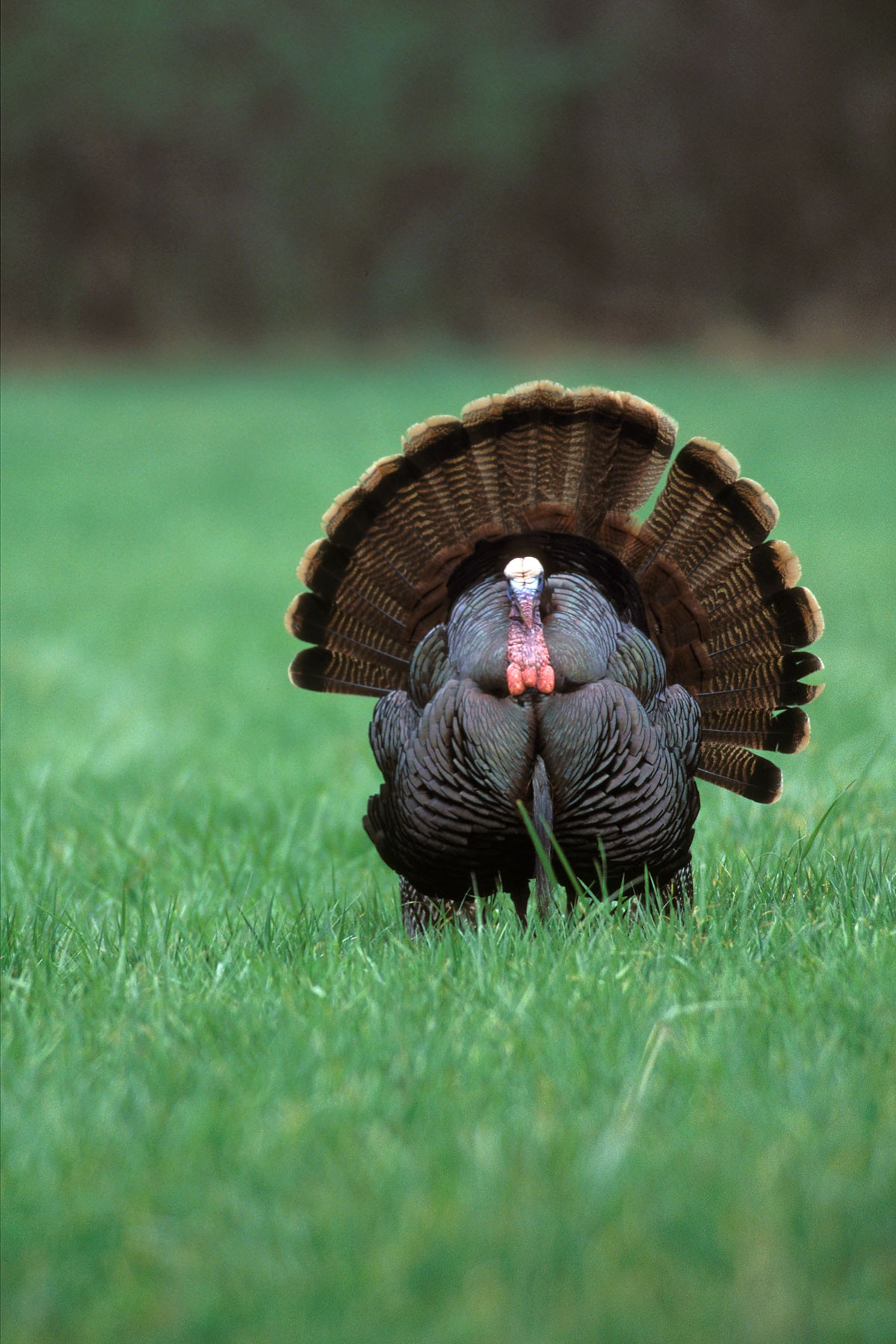
A male (tom) wild turkey (Meleagris gallopavo) strutting (spreading its feathers) in a field

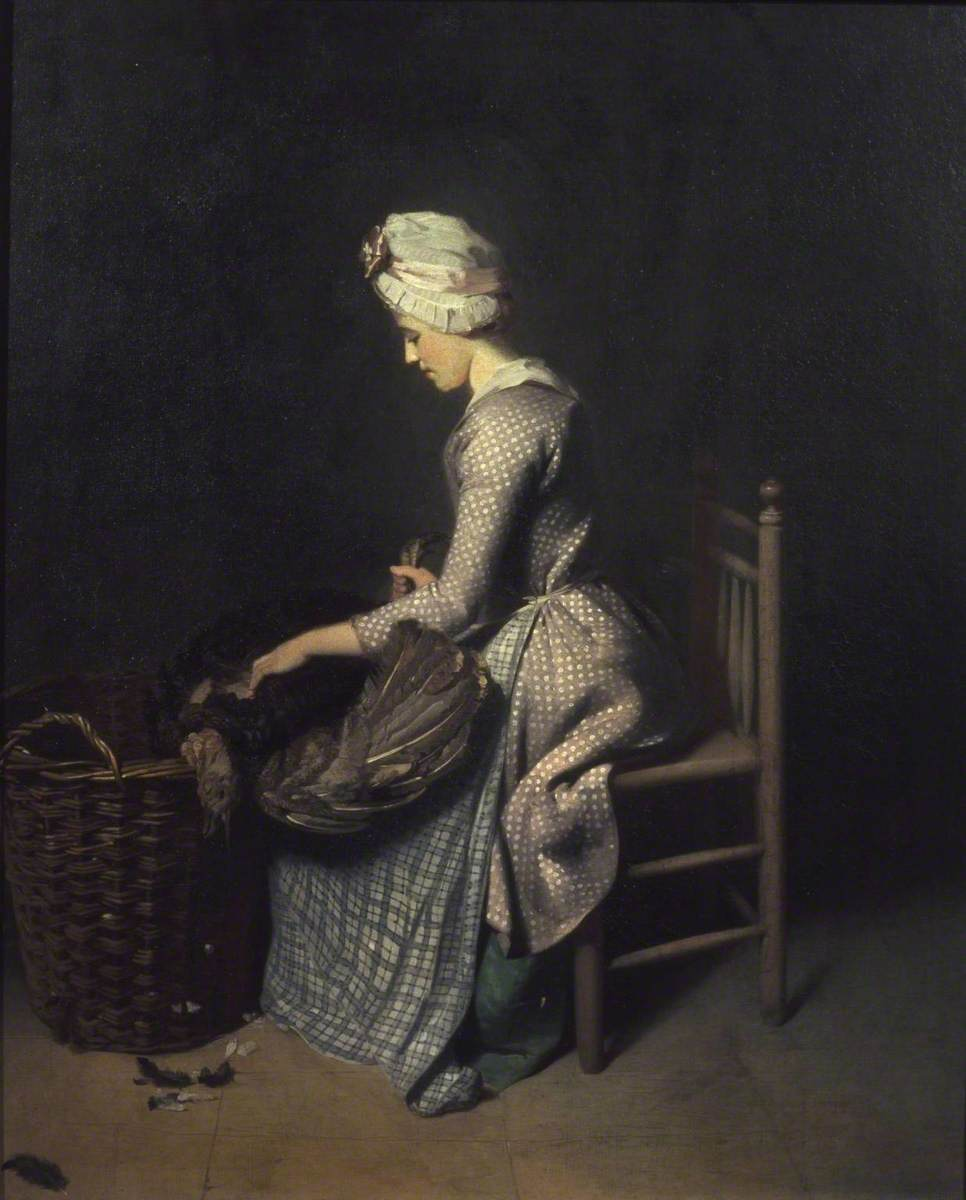
Plucking the Turkey by Henry Walton, 1776

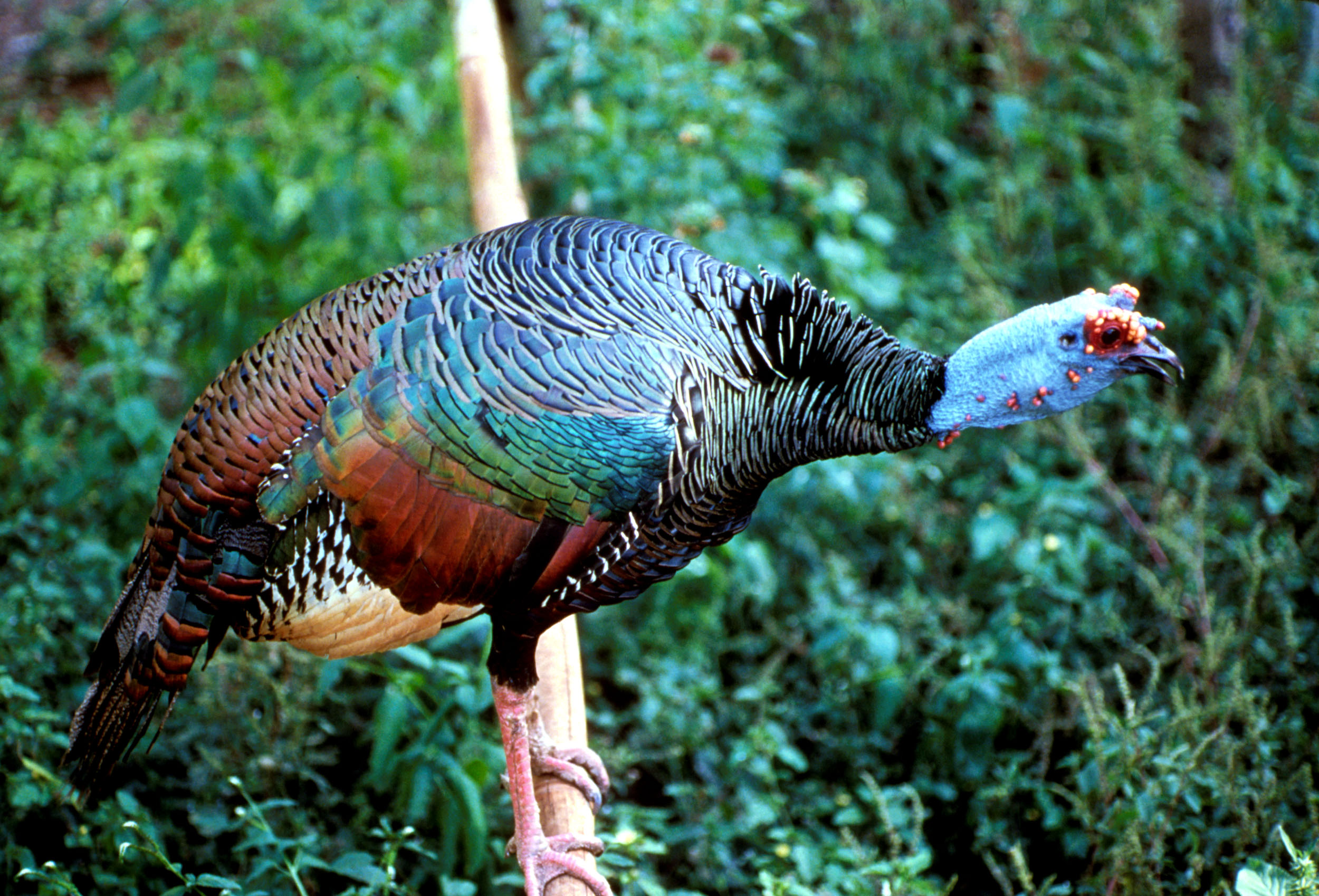
A male ocellated turkey (Meleagris ocellata) with a blue head

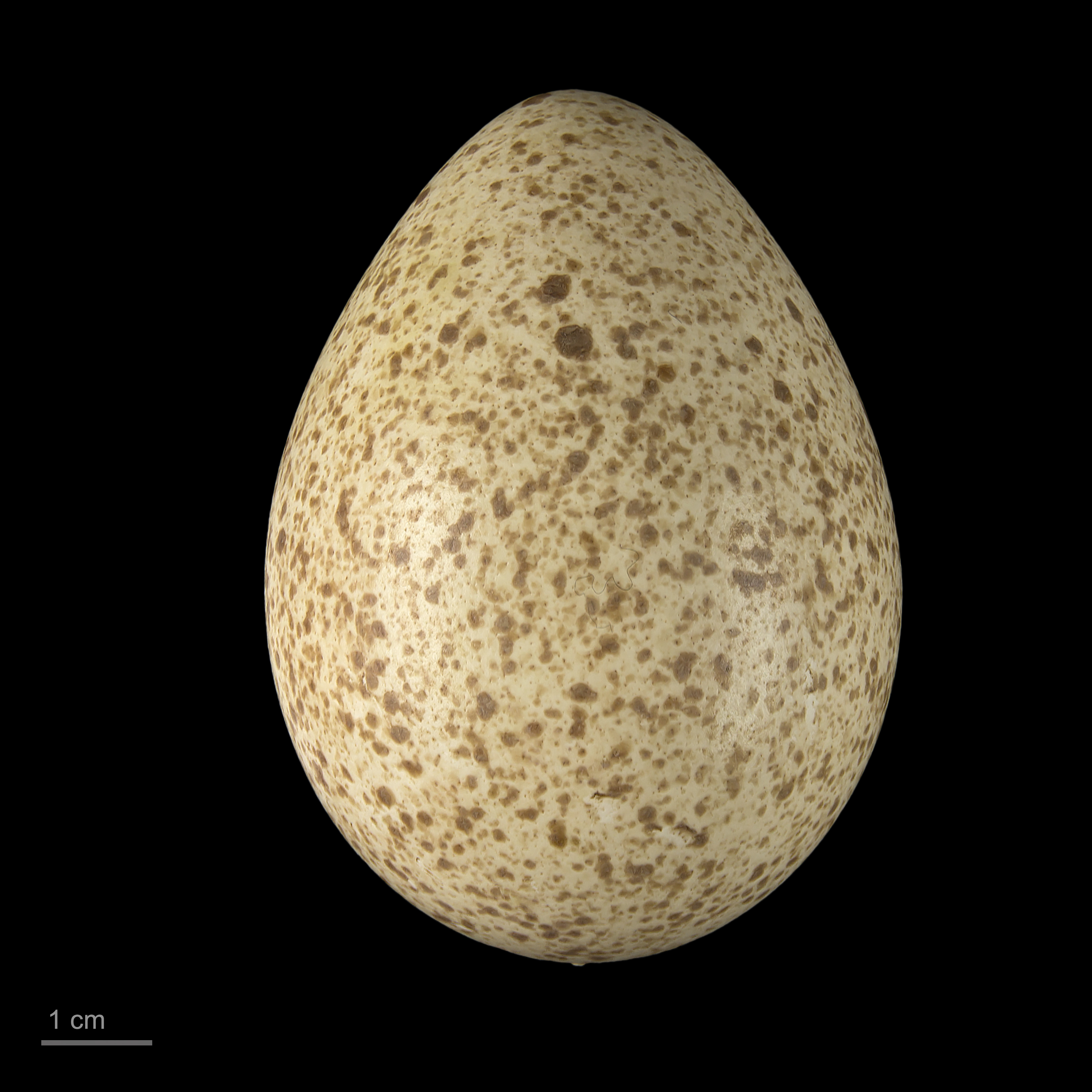
Egg of wild turkey (Meleagris gallopavo)
