= Southwestern turkey =

Southwestern turkey Temporal range: Late Pleistocene

Scientific classification
- Kingdom: Animalia
- Phylum: Chordata
- Class: Aves
- Order: Galliformes
- Family: Phasianidae
- Genus: Meleagris
- Species: †M. crassipes

Binomial name
- †Meleagris crassipes (Miller, 1940)

Extinct species of bird

The southwestern turkey (Meleagris crassipes), sometimes called the big‑foot turkey, is an extinct species of turkey from the Late Pleistocene of North America. It was first described in 1940 by Loye Miller from fossils found in San Josecito Cave, Nuevo León, Mexico.

Miller named the species based on a male tarsometatarsus and associated skeletal material. It belongs to the genus Meleagris, which also includes the modern wild turkey (Meleagris gallopavo) and the ocellated turkey (Meleagris ocellata).

The defining feature of M. crassipes is its large, heavy tarsometatarsus. Compared to modern turkeys, it had stronger legs and a more robust skeletal structure. These traits indicate that it was well adapted to life on the ground in open or semi‑open habitats.

The type specimen was recovered from San Josecito Cave in northern Mexico. Additional remains have been reported from cave deposits in the Southwestern United States, including New Mexico and Arizona. Fossil evidence places the species within Late Wisconsinan faunal assemblages.

Assemblages containing M. crassipes suggest that it inhabited woodland and riparian ecosystems. Its extinction coincided with broader Late Pleistocene megafauna losses, likely influenced by climatic changes and possibly human activity.

M. crassipes disappeared by the end of the Late Pleistocene. The causes are uncertain, but environmental shifts and anthropogenic pressures are considered likely contributors.
