= Plucking the Turkey =

Painting by Henry Walton

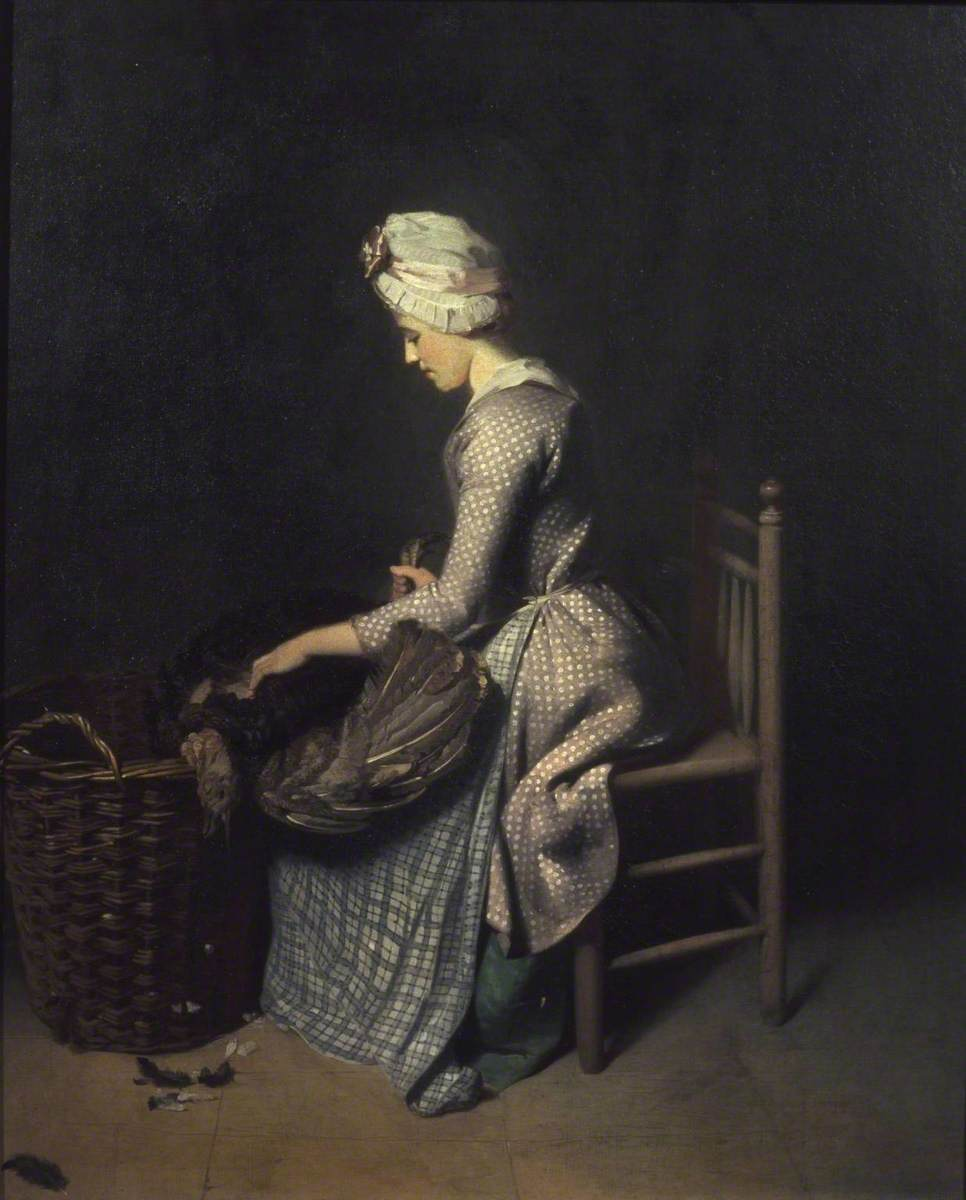
- Artist: Henry Walton
- Year: 1776
- Type: Oil on canvas, genre painting
- Dimensions: 76.2 cm × 63.5 cm (30.0 in × 25.0 in)
- Location: Tate Britain, London

Plucking the Turkey is a 1776 oil painting by the British artist Henry Walton. A genre painting it depicts a woman, likely a kitchen maid, in the process of plucking a turkey.

Produced during the second year of the American War of Independence, it has been read as an allegory of the conflict. Given the turkey was native to the Thirteen Colonies, and figures like Benjamin Franklin had used them as an emblem of America, the picture could be regarded as a patriotic statement of support for the British Army's war efforts.

Walton is known for his scenes of everyday life such as A Girl Buying a Ballad (1778). The painting was displayed at the 1776 exhibition of the Society of Artists in the Strand. Today it is in the collection of the Tate Britain, having been purchased in 1912.

== Bibliography ==
- Hoock, Holger. Empires of the Imagination: Politics, War, and the Arts in the British World, 1750–1850. Profile Books, 2010.
- Postle, Martin. Angels & Urchins: The Fancy Picture in 18th-century British Art. Djanogly Art Gallery, 1998.
- Waterhouse, Ellis. Painting in Britain, 1530 to 1790. Yale University Press, 1994.
