= A Girl Buying a Ballad =

Painting by Henry Walton

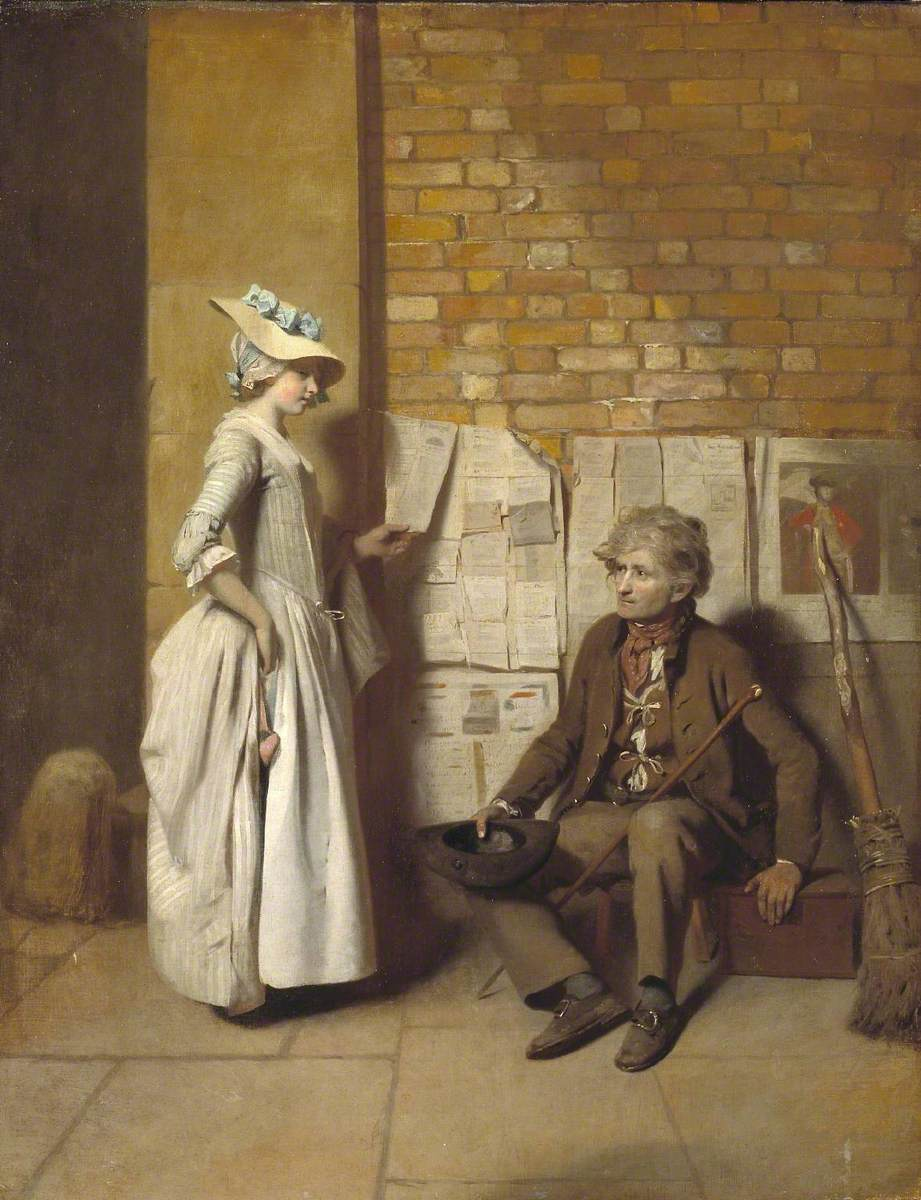
- Artist: Henry Walton
- Year: 1778
- Type: Oil on canvas, genre painting
- Dimensions: 92.1 cm × 71.7 cm (36.3 in × 28.2 in)
- Location: Tate Britain; London

A Girl Buying a Ballad is a 1778 genre painting by the English artist Henry Walton. It features a young woman purchasing the sheet music for a ballad from a street seller. It was a popular image and became the subject of several popular, cheaply-produced prints. The portrait of a general visible was that of Sir William Howe, a British commander in the American War of Independence.

The Norwich-born Walton moved to London in 1770 and became known for his genre works such as Plucking the Turkey. The painting is in the collection of the Tate Britain in Pimlico, having been acquired by the British government in 2000 through acceptance in lieu and allocated to the gallery.

== Bibliography ==
- Murphy, Kevin & O'Driscoll, Sally (ed.) Studies in Ephemera: Text and Image in Eighteenth-Century Print. Bucknell University Press, 2013.
- Salman, Jeroen. Pedlars and the Popular Press: Itinerant Distribution Networks in England and the Netherlands 1600-1850. BRILL, 2013.
- Shoemaker, Robert Brink. The London Mob: Violence and Disorder in Eighteenth-century England. A&C Black, 2004.
