= Henry Walton (English painter) =

English painter

- Born: Henry Walton; 1746; Dickleburgh, Norfolk county, England, United Kingdom
- Died: 1813 (aged 66–67); London, England, United Kingdom
- Known for: Painting

Henry Walton (1746–1813) was an English painter and art dealer.

== Life ==
Little is known of Walton's early life. In 1770, he began studying art at the St. Martin's Lane Academy, in London. Walton primarily worked as a portraitist, painting in oil and producing miniatures. Later he painted some genre works. Records show he later worked as a picture dealer and adviser to some major private collectors.

== Gallery ==
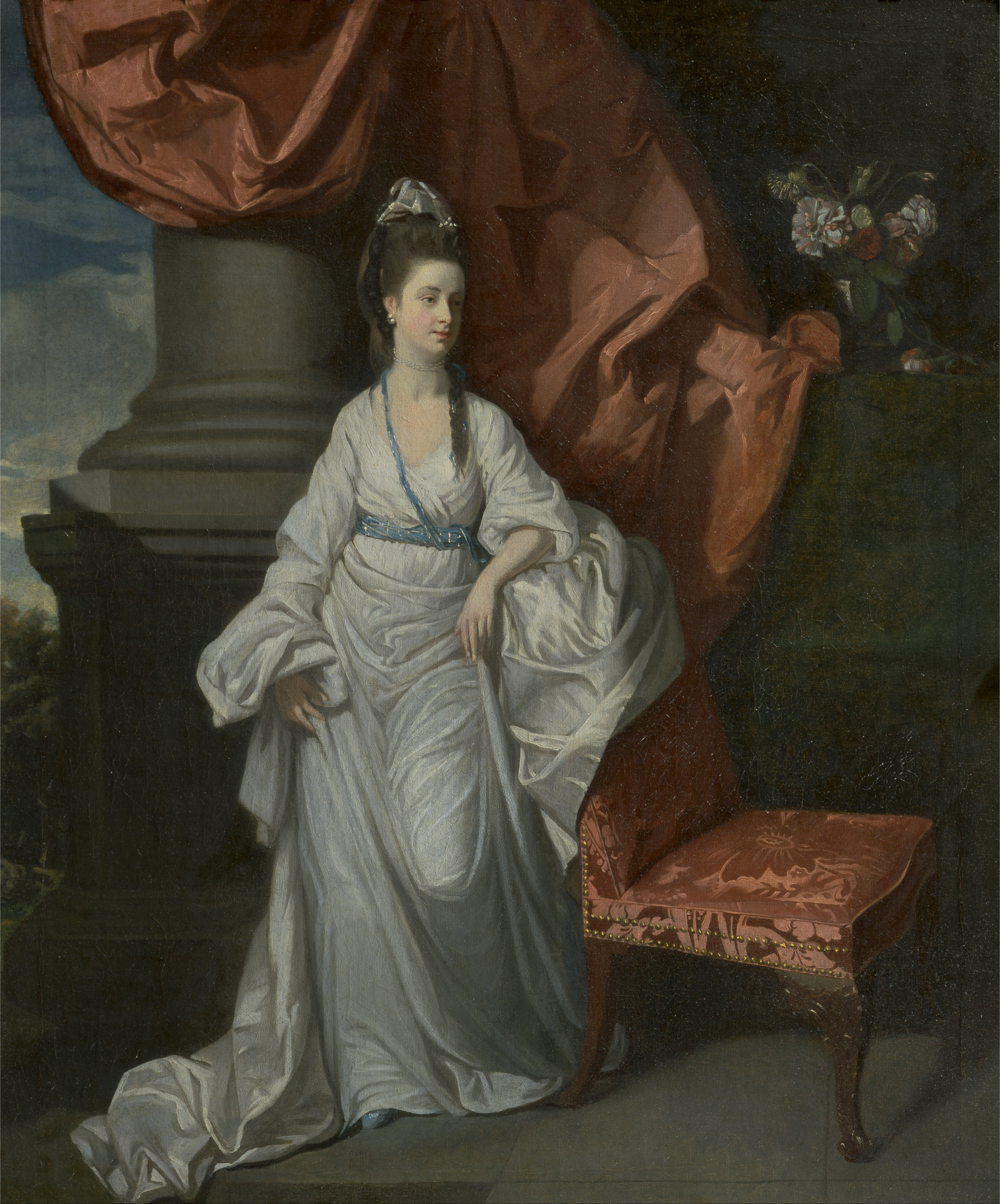
Lady Grant, Wife of Sir James Grant

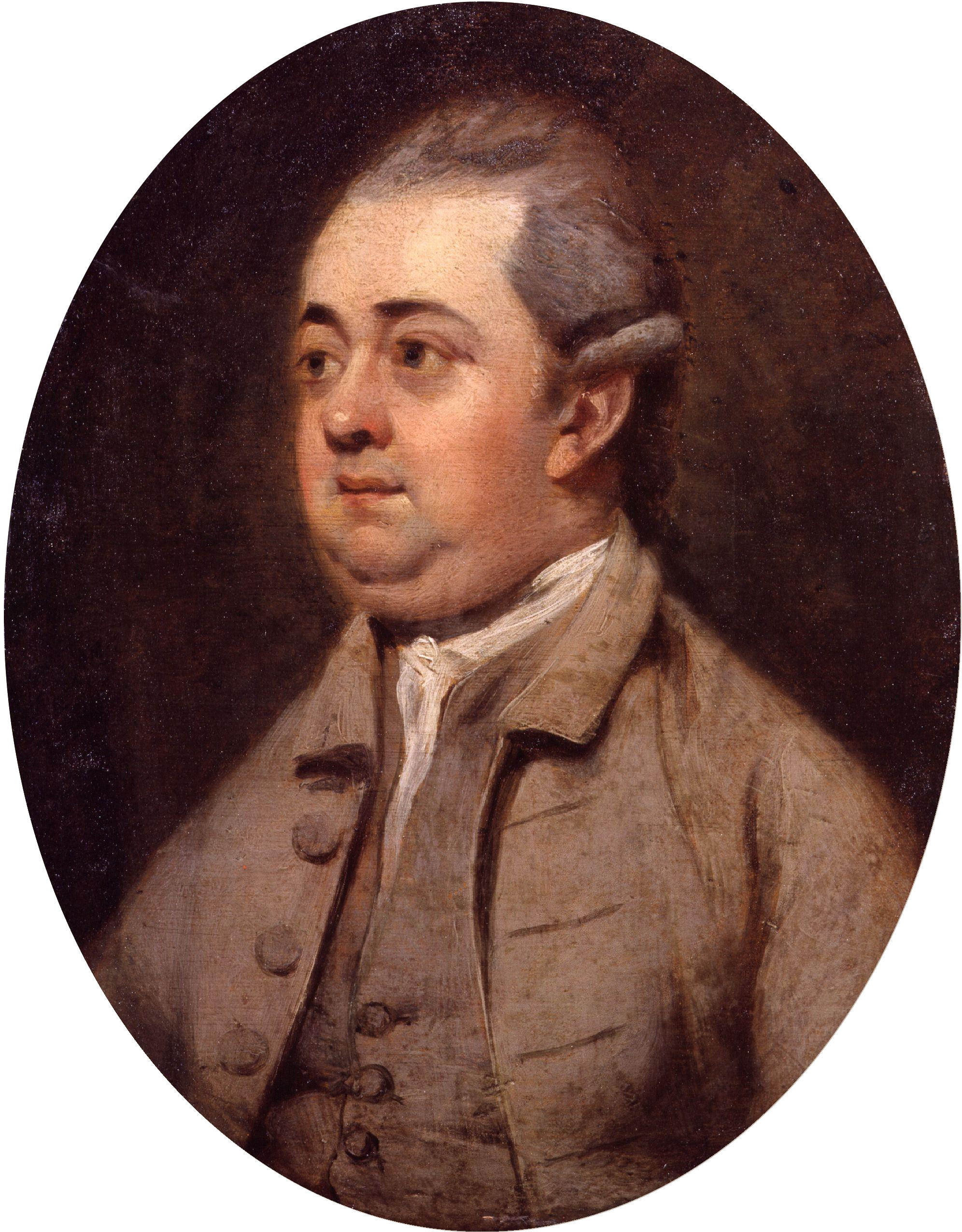
Portrait of Edward Gibbon, 1773

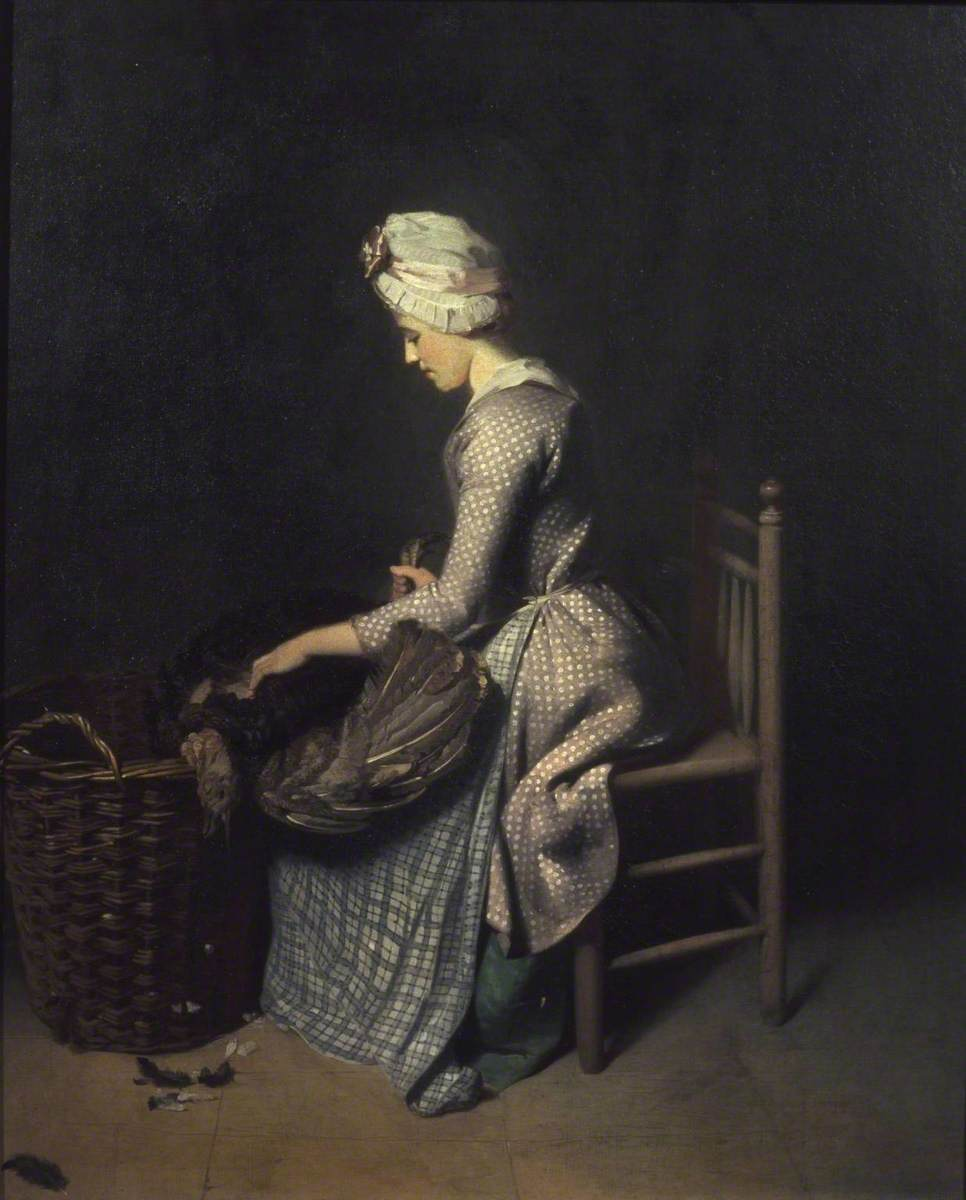
Plucking the Turkey, 1776

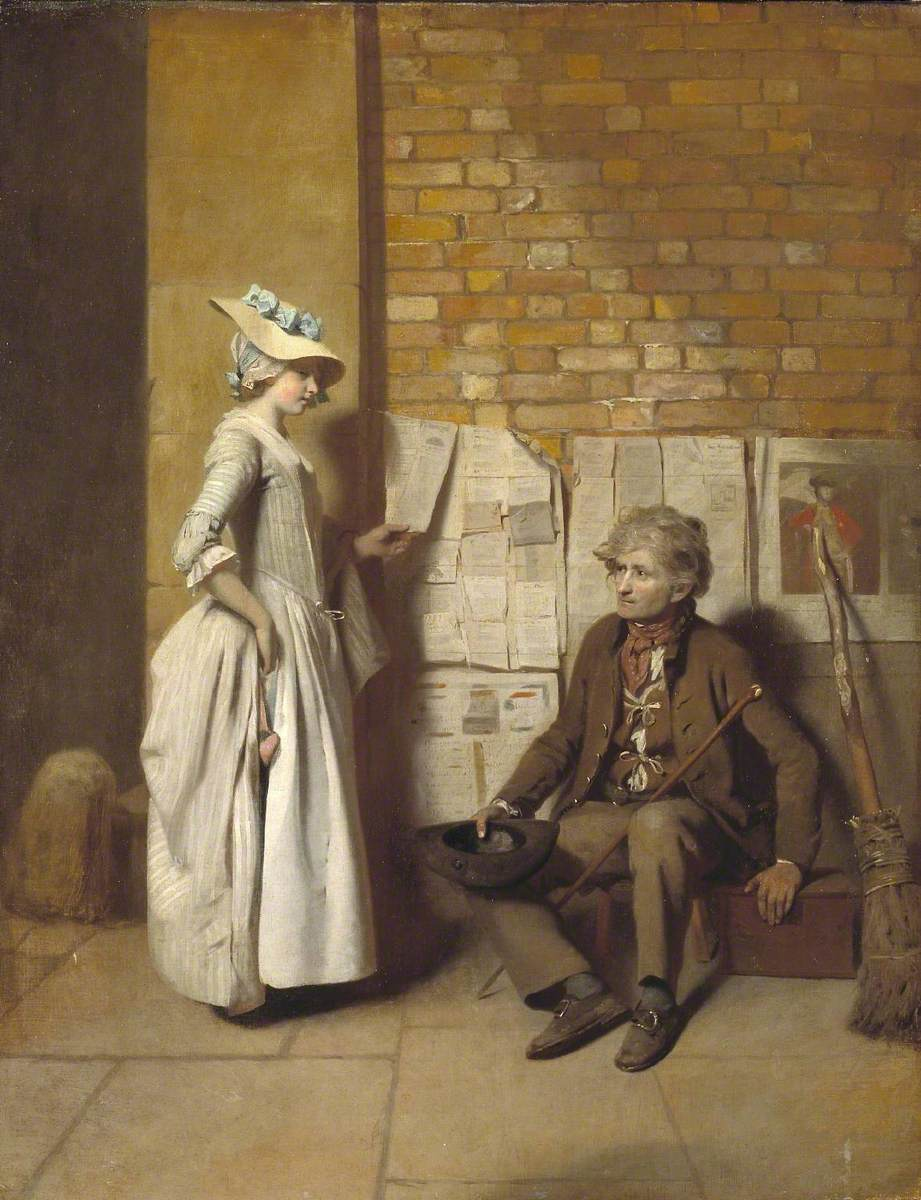
A Girl Buying a Ballad, 1778

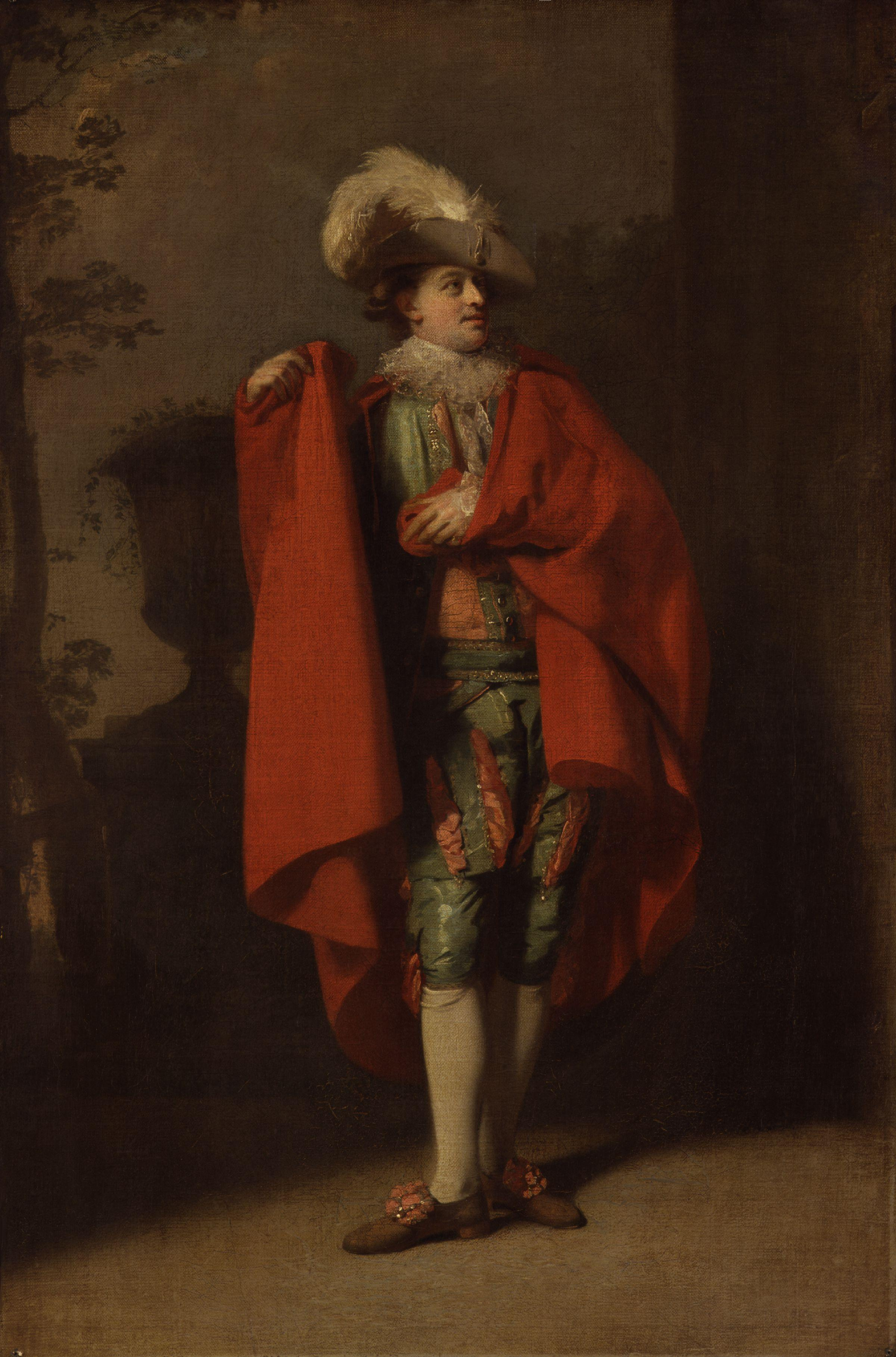
John Palmer as Count Almaviva, 1779
