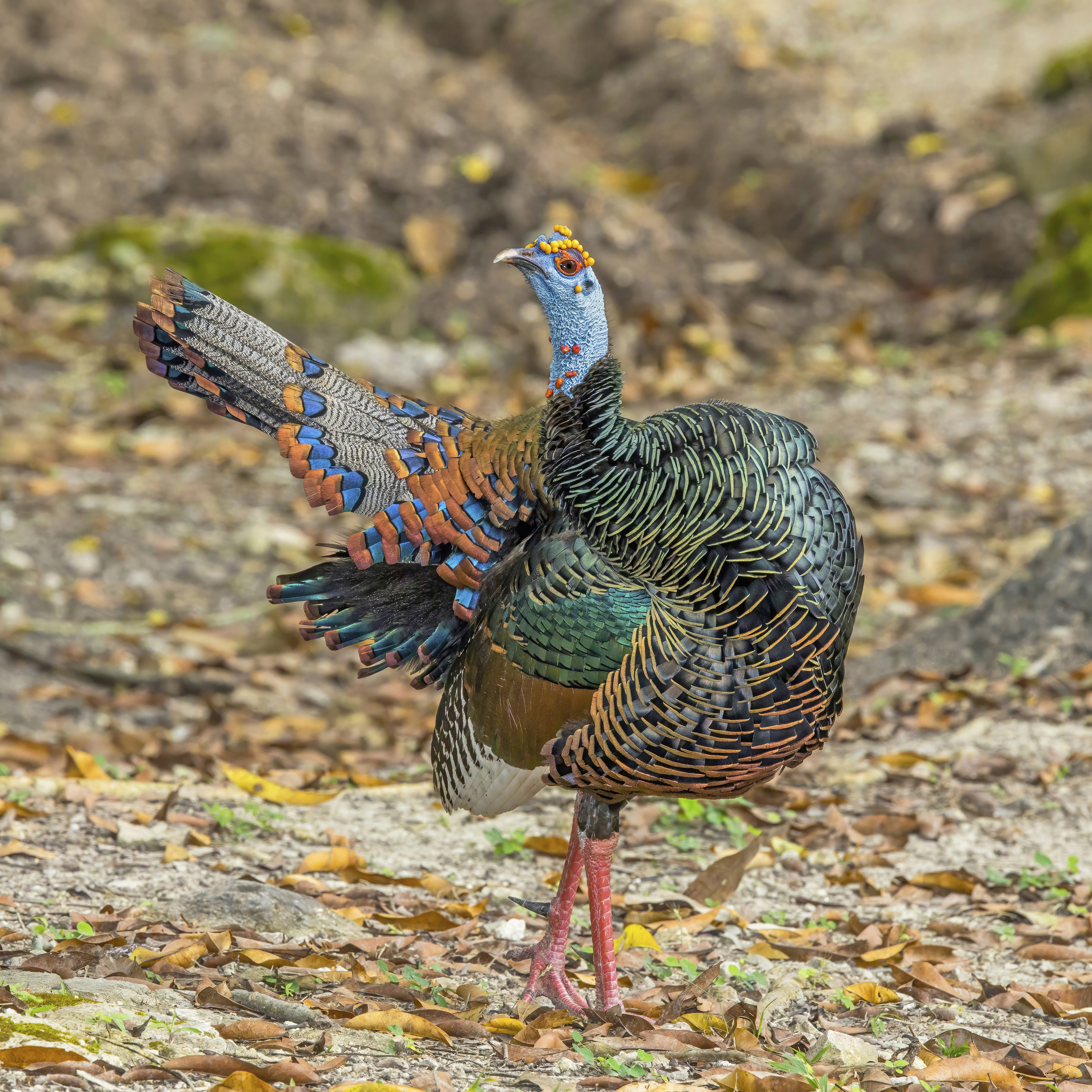
- Male, Peten, Guatemala

Conservation status
- Near Threatened (IUCN 3.1)

Scientific classification
- Kingdom: Animalia
- Phylum: Chordata
- Class: Aves
- Order: Galliformes
- Family: Phasianidae
- Genus: Meleagris
- Species: M. ocellata

Binomial name
- Meleagris ocellata Cuvier, 1820
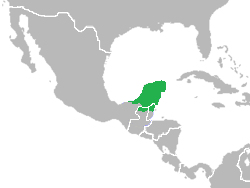
- Approximate distribution

Synonyms
- Agriocharis ocellata

= Ocellated turkey =

Species of turkey native to (Yucatan Peninsula) Mexico, Guatemala, and Belize

The ocellated turkey (Meleagris ocellata) is a species of turkey residing primarily in the Yucatán Peninsula, Mexico, as well as in parts of Belize and Guatemala. A relative of the North American wild turkey (Meleagris gallopavo), it was sometimes previously considered in a genus of its own (Agriocharis), but the differences between the two turkeys are currently considered too small to justify generic segregation. It is a relatively large bird, at around 70–122 cm (28–48 in) long and an average weight of 3 kg (6.6 lb) in females and 5 kg (11 lb) in males.

The ocellated turkey lives only in a 130,000 km^{2} (50,000 sq mi) range in the Yucatán Peninsula in Mexico—which includes all or part of the states of Quintana Roo, Campeche, Yucatán, Tabasco, and Chiapas—as well as the northern and western parts of Belize and northern Guatemala.

The ocellated turkey was considered endangered by Mexican authorities as recently as 2002 and has been considered Near Threatened by the IUCN since 2004.

== Ecology ==
The species is believed to have experienced a decline in response to land use changes and higher than sustainable harvest by migrant workers and subsistence hunters living in the Yucatán Peninsula region of Central America. A study conducted in the year 2011 indicated that the ocellated turkey made up a substantial amount of the diets of four prominent ethnic groups of the Yucatán Peninsula.

== Description ==
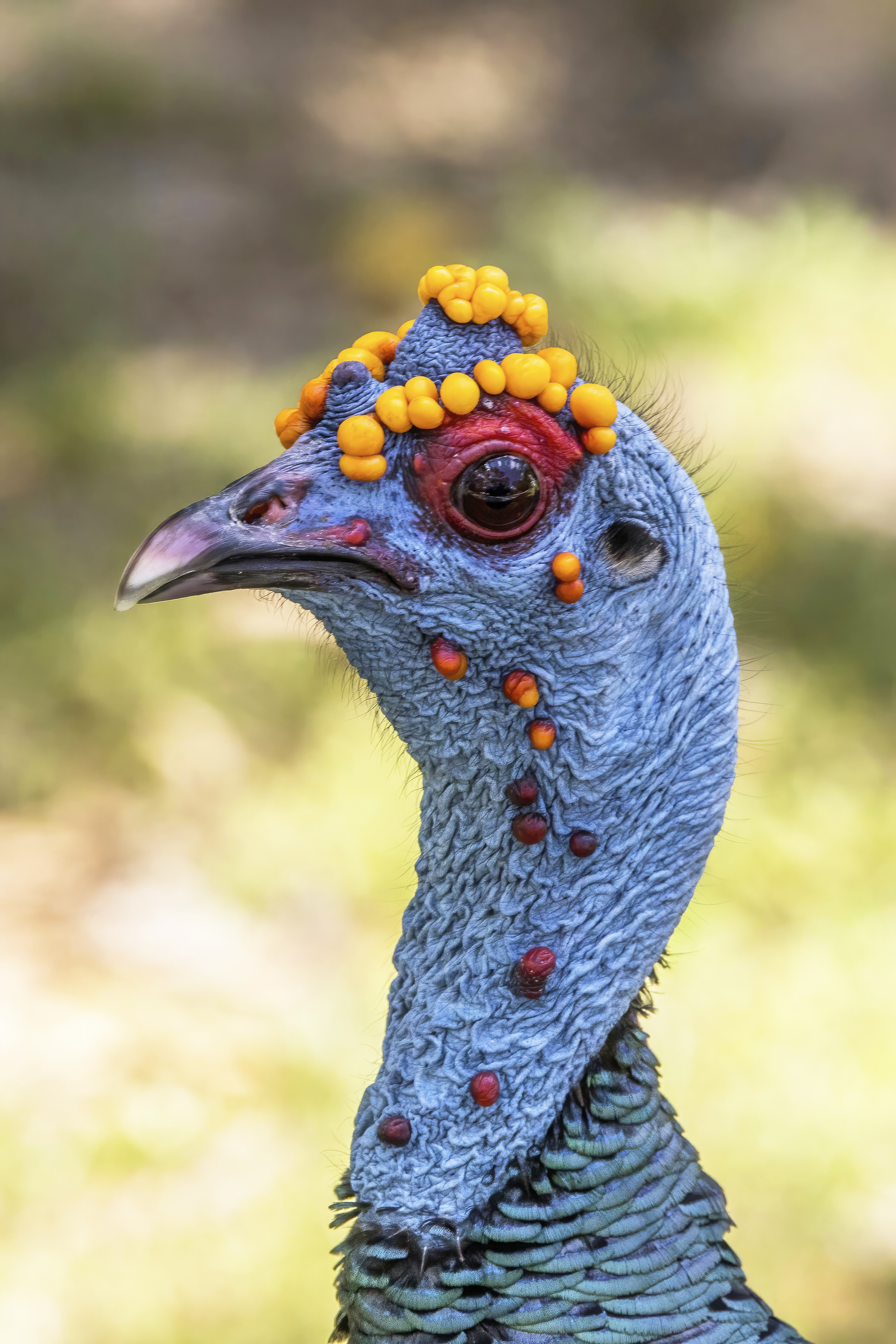
Closeup of a male

The body feathers of both sexes are a mixture of bronze and green iridescent color. Although females can be duller with more green, the breast feathers do not generally differ and cannot be used to determine sex. Neither sex possesses the "beard" typically found in wild turkeys. Tail feathers of both sexes are bluish-grey with an eye-shaped, blue-bronze spot near the end with a bright gold tip. The spots, or ocelli (located on the tail), for which the ocellated turkey is named, have been likened to the patterning typically found on peafowl. The upper, major secondary wing coverts are rich iridescent copper. The primary and secondary wing feathers have similar barring to that of North American turkeys, but the secondaries have more white, especially around the edges.

Both sexes have blue heads with some orange or red nodules, which are more pronounced on males. The males also have a fleshy blue crown covered with nodules, similar to those on the neck, behind the snood. During breeding season this crown swells up and becomes brighter and more pronounced in its yellow-orange color. The eye is surrounded by a ring of bright red skin, which is most visible on males during breeding season. The legs are deep red and are shorter and thinner than on North American turkeys. Males over one year old have spurs on the legs that average 4 cm (1 1/2 in), with lengths of over 6 cm (2.4 in) being recorded. These spurs are much longer and thinner than on North American turkeys.

Ocellated turkeys are much smaller than any of the subspecies of North American wild turkey, with adult hens weighing about 4 kg (8.8 lb) before laying eggs and 3 kg (6–7 pounds) the rest of the year, and adult males weighing about 5–6 kg (11–13 lb) during breeding season.

Vocalizations of the hen ocellated turkeys are similar to those of their northern relatives, however the male vocalization known as a "gobble" is quite different in comparison. The gobble begins with several low frequency "thumps", much like the sound of a small gasoline motor starting. As the tempo of thumps increases, the typical gobble is produced. Branton and Berryhill (2007) have observed that the male ocellated turkey does not gobble per se like the wild turkey. Rather, his song is distinct and includes some six to seven bongo-like bass tones which quicken in both cadence and volume until a crescendo is reached whereupon the bird's head is fully erect while he issues forth a rather high-pitched but melodious series of chops. The ocellated turkey will typically begin his singing 20 to 25 minutes before sunrise—similar to the wild turkey.

== Behavior ==
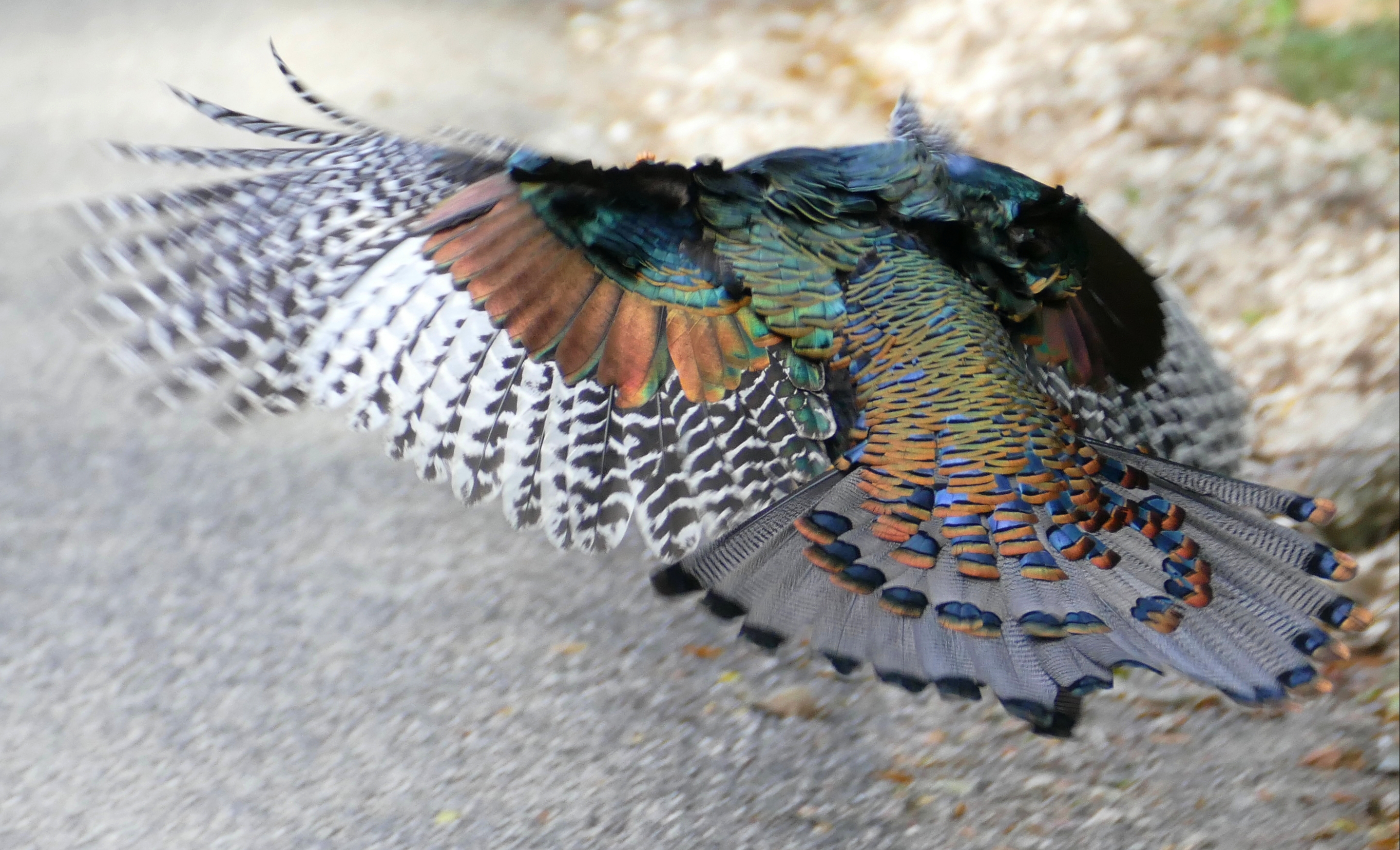
In flight

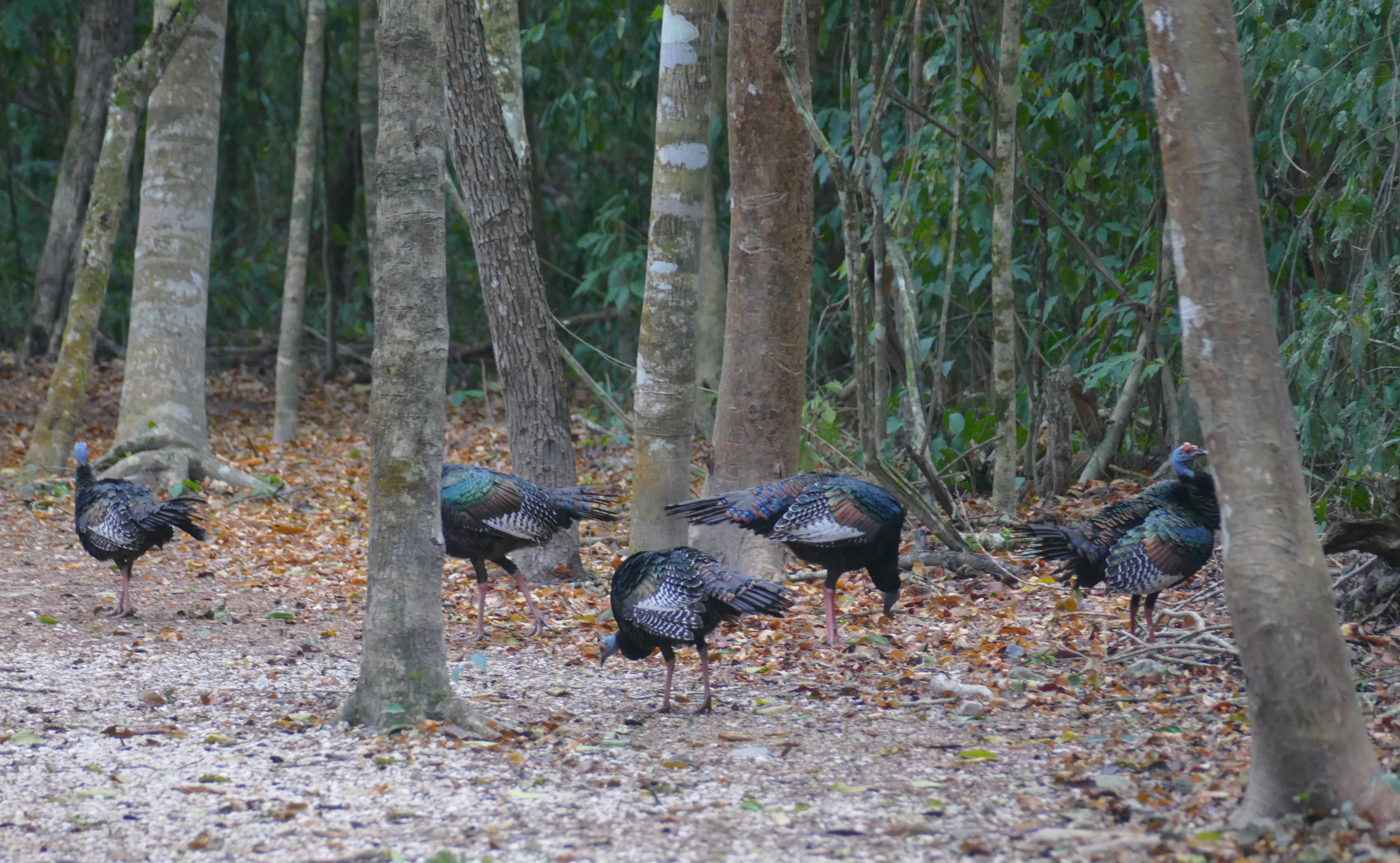
Foraging near Nohoch Mul pyramid

Turkeys spend most of the time on the ground and during the day, they often prefer running to escape danger rather than taking off, though they can fly swiftly and powerfully for short distances when necessary, as typical of gamebirds. Roosting is usually high in trees away from night-hunting predators, such as jaguars, and usually in a family group.

The ocellated turkey is a generalist in terms of its feeding habits. They are known to feed on a wide variety of forage including but not limited to insects, such as beetles, moths, and leafcutter ants, grass seeds, nuts, and leaves. The feeding rates of male ocellated turkeys have been observed to be significantly higher during January before the breeding season begins than when the breeding season is in full swing. Prior to the breeding season, adult male turkeys have been observed in flocks usually no larger than three mature birds, whereas flocks of eight or more birds consisted of yearling turkeys and hens.

The breeding season for the ocellated turkey begins in early February when the first gobbles are heard. The breeding season peaks in March and comes to an end by the end of April. Male ocellated turkeys engage in an elaborate, spirited display to attract females. Ocellated turkeys use their tail fans similar to North American turkeys; however, there are several distinct differences between the display of the ocellated and their North American cousins. Male turkeys begin the mating dance by tapping their feet against the ground in rapid succession. Next, the male birds move their tail feathers from side to side while quickly vibrating their wings and dragging the tips of them against the ground. As the male does this dance, he moves around the female making sure the dorsal surface of the tail feathers are constantly in view of the female.

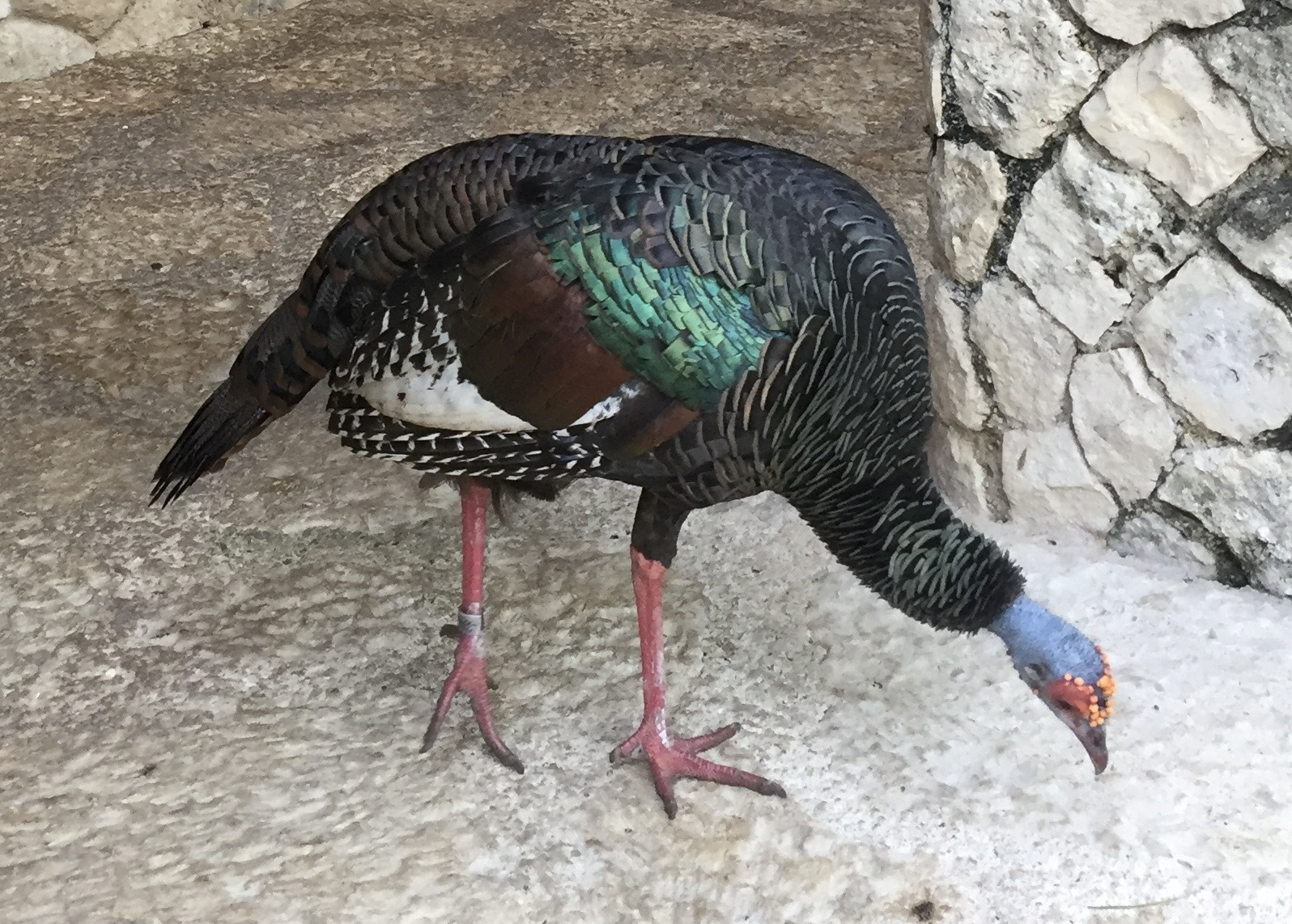
Female, Foraging in the Xcaret Park

Female ocellated turkeys lay 8–15 eggs in a well concealed nest on the ground. The poults hatch in May through July after a 28-day incubation period. The poults are covered in a reddish brown juvenile plumage which allows them to blend into their surroundings to hide from predators. The young are precocial and able to leave the nest after one night. They then follow their mother until they reach young adulthood when they begin to range though often re-grouping to roost.

== In culture ==
The Mayans (who call it kuuts or yuum kuuts) have a story where the turkey's feathers were given to him by the nightjar who vouched for him to be anointed king of the birds by the Great Ancestor (Nohochacyum) in return for a reward. As the turkey completely forgot what he owed the nightjar, the latter complained to Nohochacyum who punished the former by changing his once-melodious voice to guttural thumps. It is associated with water, rain (especially through the deity Chaak) and fecundity; tribes like the Chʼortiʼ once offered its blood across their fields in hopes of a good harvest. Its carcasses were also offered to use by Mayan chiefs, even found in their tombs.
