= Emperor John Alexander Woodford =

English ornithologist and collector (1764–1817)

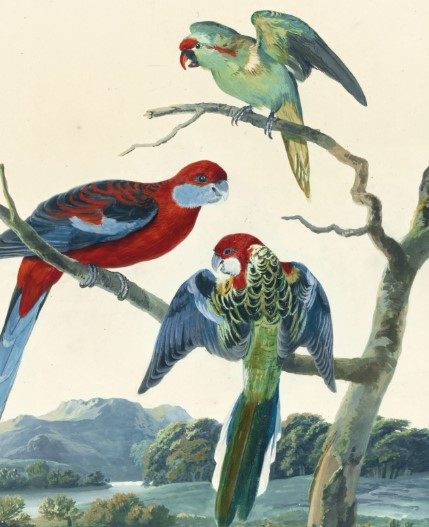
Parakeets from Emperor Woodford's collection.

Emperor John Alexander Woodford (1764–1817) was a British Army officer, early fellow of the Linnean Society of London, botanist, ornithologist and bird-related art collector, whose library of over 1,700 valuable books was sold by auction in 1809 following a scandalous misappropriation of public funds. His first name of Emperor is not a title but a family name derived from his mother's maiden name.

== Early life and military service ==
Born to Mary Emperor and Colonel John Woodford, Emperor Woodford was raised in the military Woodford household in Southern England and attended Westminster School before taking a commission as a young man, first in the Foot Guards and subsequently in the 17th Leicestershire Regiment. In Oct. 1794, following the completion of his military career, he was appointed to the lucrative position of Chief Inspector and Commissary General of Foreign Corps in His Majesty's forces and in 1797 he inherited a considerable private fortune after being named in the notorious will of his uncle, Peter Thellusson. This, combined with a sinecure he secured in the East India Company under his cousin, George Woodford Thellusson allowed him to devote his time and energy to his all consuming passions of book-collecting, ornithology, horticulture, and natural history.

== Ornithology and horticulture ==
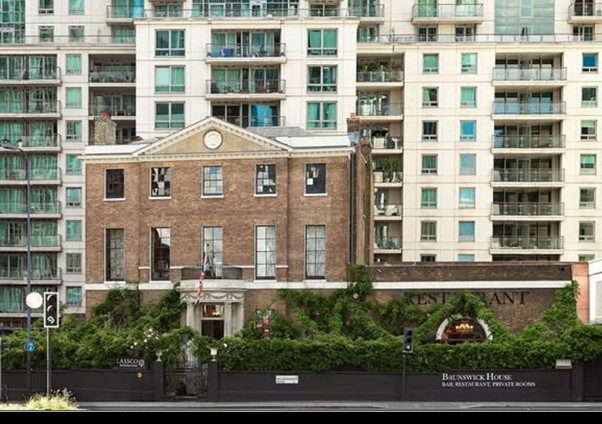
Brunswick House Vauxhall, Woodford's home 1798-1809

By the early 1800s Woodford's incipient bibliomania and passion for orntihology had developed into an obsession which led him first into impecunity and subsequently into fraud and theft as he attempted to compile a definitive collection of illustrations of rare and exotic birds. In an attempt to comprehensively update, or perhaps supersede, the work of Georges-Louis Leclerc, Comte de Buffon, Woodford commissioned hundreds of copies and studies from a number of painters and artists including Ramsay Richard Reinagle, Jean Lebrecht Reinold, Sydenham Edwards and John William Lewin.

Drawing from first-hand observation of the Leverian collection, the Exeter Change Collection, the Joseph Banks Collection and the private menagerie of William V, Prince of Orange, Woodford was able to compile an exquisite and unique collection which stood at the forefront of early nineteenth-century ornithology and provided a treasure-trove for future ornithological research. Woodford's collection was noted as one of the major sources of John Latham's seminal and encyclopaedic General History of Birds, 1821-1828.

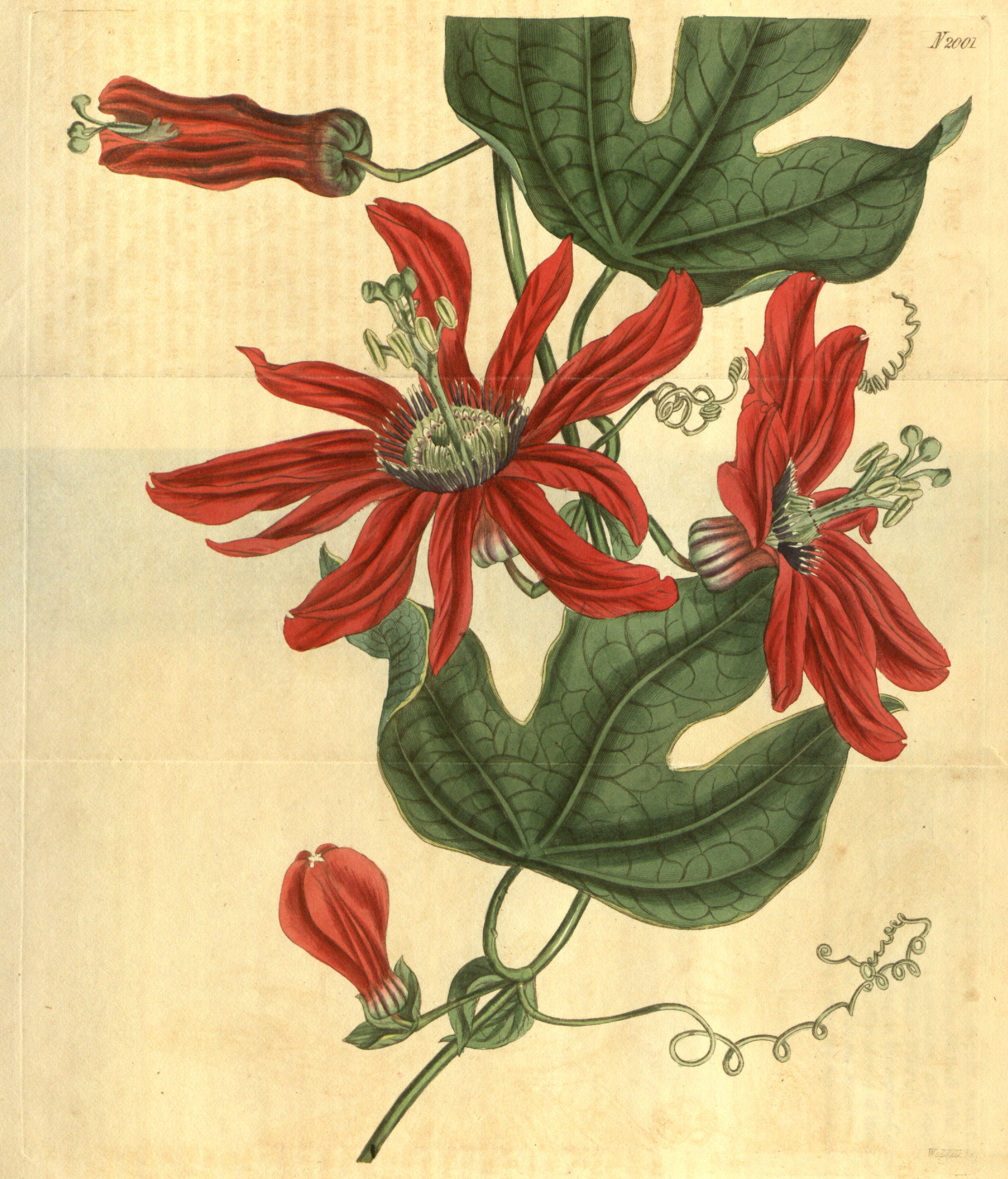
Passiflora Racemosa

While in London between 1798 and 1809, Woodford occupied Belmont House (Later Brunswick House) at Vauxhall where he housed his vast library as well as his botanical and ornithological collection. Here he had land reclaimed from the Thames and constructed hothouses and greenhouses to grow rare and exotic plants as well as constructing a handsome library to contain his many precious books. At Vauxhall Woodford is reported to have cultivated the first Zinnia elegans to be grown in Britain. During this period he also dispatched his half brother John Gordon on an all-expenses paid trip to New South Wales to gather rare and previously uncatalogued botanical specimens.

== Scandal and exile ==
Despite his inherited wealth and pair of official sinecures, between 1805 and 1809 it slowly become apparent that not only had Woodford exhausted his own fortune in his ornithological mania but that he had begun to misappropriate funds from his official position as Chief Inspector and Commissary General of Foreign Corps. Specifically he had taken monies intended for French Royalist veterans in British employ to subsidise his book-buying.

When the scandal finally came to a head, in May 1809, Woodford was forced to flee his country, creditors and an outraged press and Parliament. He later emerged at the court of the Portuguese Prince Regent in Brazil where he appears to have been enabled to carry on his researches into rare flora and fauna. Some time later, he is recorded as having successfully transported a rare specimen of Passiflora racemosa or Red Passion Flower, from Brazil to Lisbon. French records indicate that he died while residing in the Hôtel de Poissac, in Bordeaux in 1817.

== Legacy ==
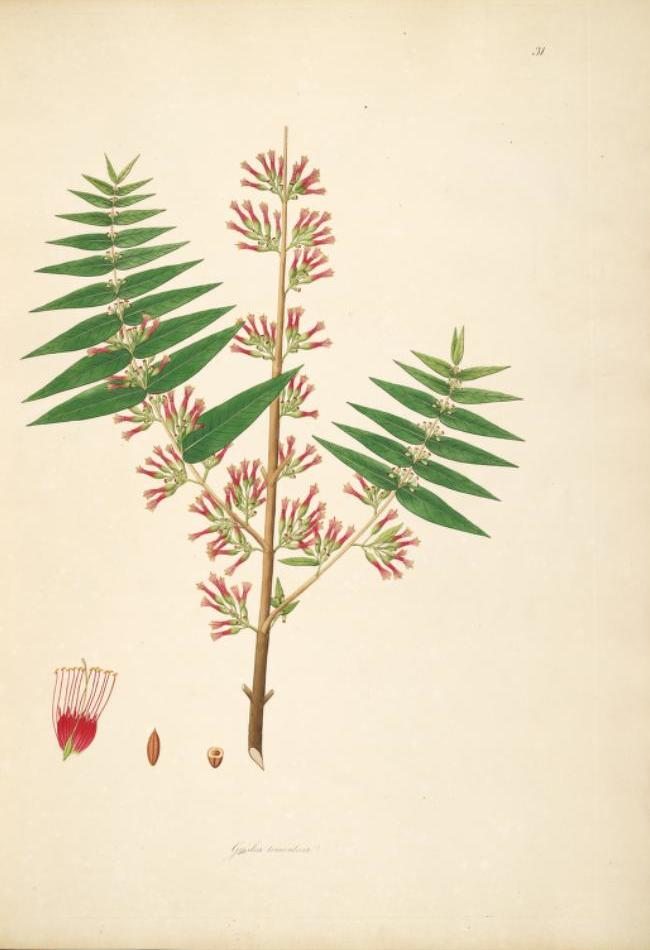
Woodfordia fruticosa

Despite the scandal that attached to his name, Woodford's role in the history of ornithology remains highly significant. His collection and illustrations in particular providing the backbone of John Latham's later magisterial Magnum Opus A General History of Birds.

Woodford's greenhouses at Vauxhall were destroyed by fire in 1805 and the remnants of his horticultral collection were auctioned in the same year. His impressive and valuable library was also sold off in May 1809 at Sotheby's and remained in private ownership until resurfacing, again at Sotheby's, in 2012 when it was again secured by a private buyer.

In 1806, before word of his financial improprieties had emerged, Woodford had been honoured by Richard Anthony Salisbury with the genus name of Woodfordia. Some years after his death, in 1834, the African Wood Owl (Strix woodfordii or Woodford's owl) was also named for him.
