= Henry Williams Baker =

Anglican priest and hymn writer

Sir Henry Williams Baker, 3rd Baronet (27 May 1821 – 12 February 1877), was an English Anglican priest and hymnwriter.

== Biography ==
Baker was the son of Vice-admiral Sir Henry Loraine Baker, C.B., by his marriage with Louisa Anne, only daughter of William Williams, Esq., of Castle Hall, Dorset. His father served with distinction at Guadeloupe in 1815. His grandfather was Sir Robert Baker of Dunstable House, Surrey, and of Nicholashayne, Culmstock, Devon, on whom a baronetcy was conferred in 1796. Sir Henry Williams Baker was born at Brunswick House, Vauxhall, London, on Sunday, 27 May 1821 in the house of his maternal grandfather. After completing his university education at Trinity College, Cambridge, took his B.A. degree and holy orders in 1844, and proceeded M.A. in 1847. In 1851 he was presented to the vicarage of Monkland near Leominster. On the death of his father, on 2 November 1859, he succeeded him as third baronet.

In 1852, while at Monkland, Sir Henry wrote his earliest hymn, 'Oh, what if we are Christ's.' Two others, 'Praise, O praise our Lord and King,' and 'There is a blessed Home,' have been referred to 1861 (Selborne's Book of Praise, pp. 176, 207–8, 288–9). Sir Henry Baker's name is chiefly known as the promoter and editor of 'Hymns Ancient and Modern,' first published in 1861. To this collection Baker contributed many original hymns, besides several translations of Latin hymns. In 1868 an 'Appendix' to the collection was issued, and in 1875 the work was thoroughly revised. The hymnal was compiled to meet the wants of churchmen of all schools, but strong objections were raised in many quarters to Sir Henry Baker's own hymn addressed to the Virgin Mary, 'Shall we not love thee. Mother dear?'

Sir Henry held the doctrine of clerical celibacy, and at his death the baronetcy devolved on a kinsman. He was the author of 'Daily Prayers for the Use of those who have to work hard,' as well as of a 'Daily Text-book' for the same class, and of some tracts on religious subjects. He died on Monday, 12 February 1877, aged 55, at the vicarage of Monkland, and was buried in the churchyard of the parish. His last words were from his hymn The King of Love My Shepherd Is: "Perverse and foolish oft I strayed / But yet in love He sought me / And on His shoulder gently laid / And home, rejoicing, brought me."

Stained glass windows have been put up to his memory in his own church and in All Saints Notting Hill.

== Hymns ==
- O praise ye the Lord! Praise him in the height (based on Psalm 150)
- My Father, for another night (tune of St. Timothy)
- The King of Love My Shepherd Is (based on Psalm 23)

Baronetage of Great Britain
Preceded by Henry Baker	Baronet (of Dunstable House); 1859–1877	Succeeded by George Sherston-Baker
