= Brunswick House =

Coordinates: 51.4848°N 0.1265°W

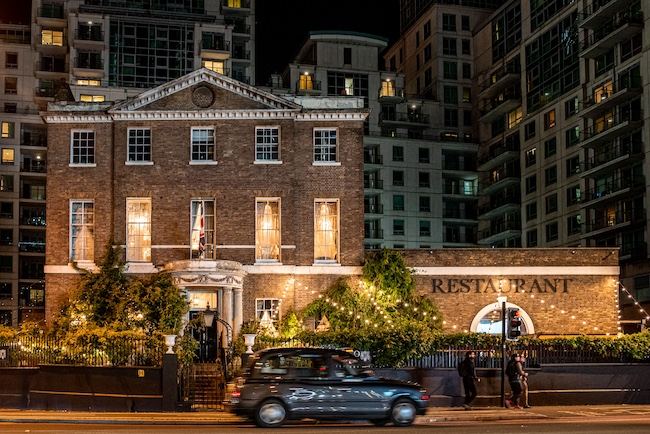
Brunswick House, Vauxhall, London

Brunswick House is a large and historic, Palladian Georgian mansion which survives near the River Thames in Vauxhall, in the London borough of Lambeth.

== 17th and 18th Centuries ==
Parts of Brunswick House date back to at least the mid seventeenth century (the vaulted cellar still gives an idea of its size). The current house was developed and extended in 1758 on freehold land owned by the Dawson family, purchased by Richard and Edward Dawson in 1737.

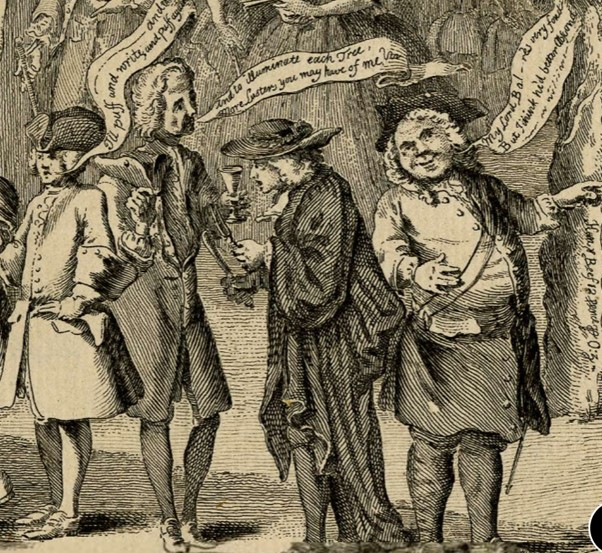
Edward Dawson (holding a glass) and Jonathon Tyers at Vauxhall Gardens, 1741

The Dawsons were local glassmakers who had started out apprenticed to the 2nd Duke of Buckingham's Glassworks in Vauxhall in the 1670s. Buckingham, a favourite of Charles II, had acquired the Royal Monopoly in Glass making by 1660 and, with his manager John Bellingham, set about recruiting a team of Venetian glassmakers who helped to revolutionise 17th Century English glassmaking. By 1670, however, the Duke of Buckingham was imprisoned in the Tower on a charge of High Treason and so handed the Glassworks over to the industrious apprentice, Richard Dawson.

Beginning in 1737 the Dawson family appears to have invested at least some of the profits of the Glassworks into the building of a speculative property, in the newly fashionable Palladian style, on a riverside location close to Vauxhall Gardens and the Portsmouth Road.

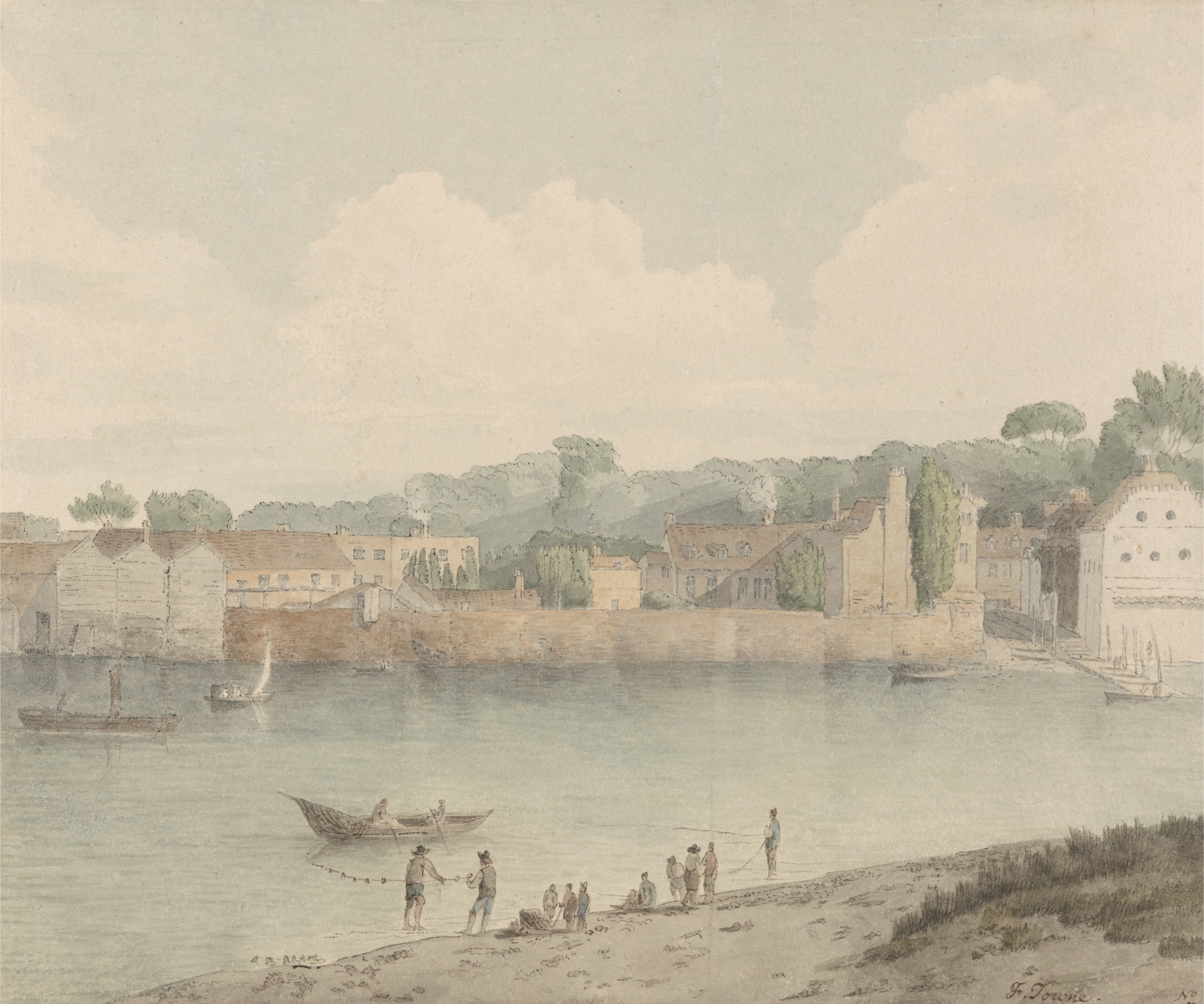
Vauxhall Stairs from Millbank 1797

The edifice completed in 1748, initially christened Belmont House, was described as a "mansion house, with offices, coach-house, and stable, lately erected by John Dawson" (Edward Dawson's nephew, son-in-law and heir). The site of the house and gardens measured nearly three acres and included a piece of land with a timber dock on lease from the Dean of Canterbury.

In 1791 the house, which was then called Belmont House, was divided into two; the larger or southwestern portion was leased to a Mr David Hunter and the other portion was leased to a Mr William Anderson.

Between 1798 and 1809 Emperor John Woodford occupied Belmont House where he housed his botanical and ornithological collection. Here he had land reclaimed from the Thames and constructed hothouses and greenhouses to grow rare and exotic plants as well as constructing a handsome library to contain his many precious books. At Vauxhall Woodford is reported to have cultivated the first Zinnia elegans to be grown in Britain. Woodford was later obliged to flee Britain, in 1809, having exhausted his personal fortune and misappropriated funds from his office as Chief Inspector and Commissary General of Foreign Corps in the Kings Forces in pursuit of his ornithological and horticultural obsessions. After his absconding from his debtors his greenhouses and library were auctioned off and dismantled.

== The Regency, The 'Black Duke of Brunswick' ==
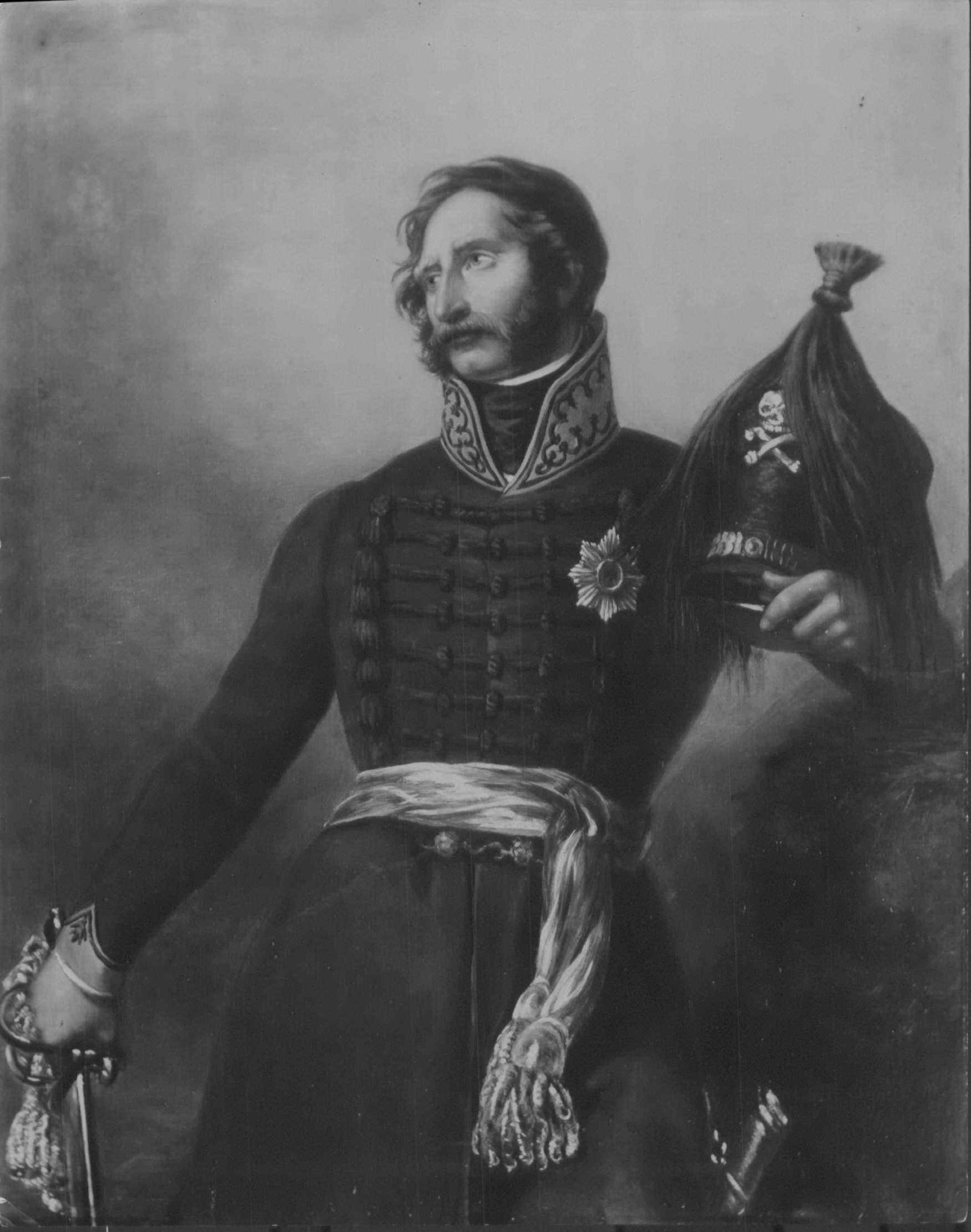
Frederick William, Duke of Brunswick and Wolfenbüttel (1771-1815)

In 1811 Anderson's half of the house was purchased by the exiled soldier and aristocrat Frederick William, Duke of Brunswick-Wolfenbuttel.

Frederick William was a bitter opponent of Napoleon's domination of Germany, and had been driven out of his Duchy of Brunswick, escaping to England with his private army in 1809 after defeat by Napoleon in the Battle of Wagram. While in exile in London the Duke took up residence and established his Court-in-Exile at Brunswick House (then still named Belmont House, in deference to the residence of the Duke's mother, the Dowager Duchess of Brunswick, in Greenwich). Frequently travelling between Vauxhall and St James's the Duke was an intimate of the Prince Regent and a familiar figure at court. During this period the House would have received a consistent stream of royal, diplomatic, military, and intelligence visits. The Dukes apparently morose and melancholic character and his habitul black dress - in mourning for his father and his Duchy - earned him the sobriquet of The Black Duke while in Britain.

In 1813 Frederick William returned to Brunswick to lead an uprising and raise fresh troops. He briefly restored his Ducal sovereignty and rebuilt his army however two years later was to be killed at the head of his men at the Battle of Quatre Bras in 1815.

The departure of the Duke and the Court of Brunswick led to something of a hiatus in the fortunes and character of the house. He was subsequently memorialised when its name was finally altered to Brunswick House in the mid 19th Century.

== The 19th Century ==
The House's next tenant of note was the Radical MP for Weymouth, William Williams, between 1818 and 1826. Descending from a prosperous family of West Country financiers, upon his majority Williams succeeded to a private fortune and a partnership in the long established family firm of Raymond, Williams, Vere, Lowe and Fletcher on Birchin Lane in the City of London, which would go on to form part of the modern Nat West group.

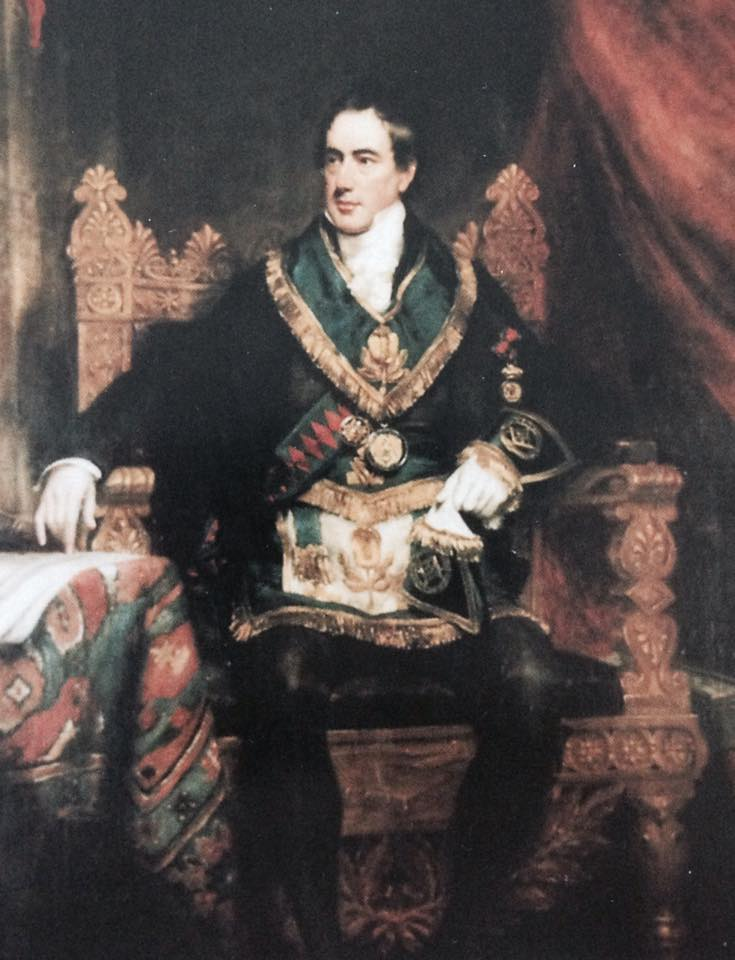
William Williams, Radical MP for Weymouth

Interestingly, Williams became a partisan in parliament of the cause of Queen Caroline, sister of the late Duke of Brunswick. Described as an 'Advanced Whig', a Friend of Reform and a staunch Abolitionist, Williams was bemoaned by King George IV as "one of the worst of radicals, invariably opposing the king and his government in every instance; in short one of the staunchest, bitterest and very worst of Whigs". He served as Masonic Provincial Grand Master of Dorset in 1812 and three years later published a volume of masonic Constitutions.

While William William's was in residence in Vauxhall he shared the occupation of Belmont House with his married daughter Louisa Anne and her husband, Vice-admiral Sir Henry Loraine Baker, C.B. who had served with distinction in America and at Guadeloupe in 1815. On Sunday, 27 May 1821 they were delivered of a son at Belmont House, Henry Williams Baker, who would go on to become one of the nations most celebrated hymnodists. His 1868 Hymn, The King of Love my Shepherd Is first appeared in the 1868 appendix to Hymns Ancient and Modern and would go on to become a national staple and Royal favourite, being sung at the funeral of Diana, Princess of Wales in 1997.

== The coming of industry ==
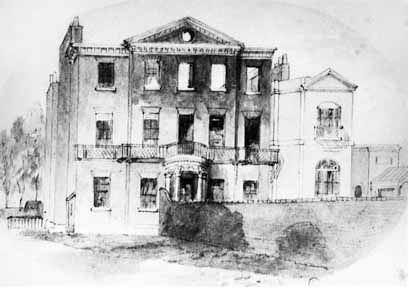
Brunswick House after the 1860 fire

With the arrival of the railway at Vauxhall in 1848 the area began to rapidly lose its reputation as a genteel riverside retreat. In light of this, David Hunter's interest in the house was sold to the Gas Light and Coke Company in 1845 and eventually purchased by the London and South Western Railway Company in 1854.

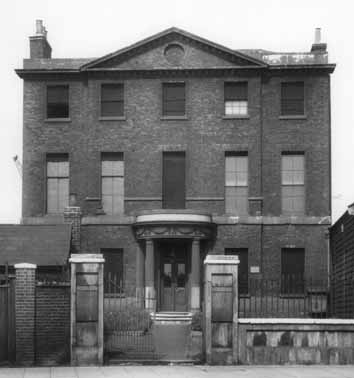
Brunswick House in 1942

In 1839 the Nine Elms Locomotive Works had been built on land adjacent to Brunswick House. They would be rebuilt in 1841 and remained the principal locomotive carriage and wagon workshops of the railway until closure in stages between 1891 and 1909. Thereafter a large steam motive power depot remained open on the site until 1967, serving Waterloo railway station. All this permanently blighted and obscured the House's riparian setting and, following a serious fire in January of 1860, the recently formed London and South West Railway Company had purchased the whole building ouright.

For the next 150 years the house would retain its links with the London and South Western Railway. First as works and offices for he adjacent Goods Yard and latterly as a Scientific and Literary Institute for the railway's staff. The club boasted two bars, a lending library and a billiard hall and remained in railway ownership until 1994 when it was sold to the railway staff association that was in occupation even though the adjacent railway yards had closed in 1967. The railwayman's association sold the house again in 2002.

During the two vacant years from 2002 to 2004 the building was squatted and extensively vandalised. A hundred and fifty years of railwaymen's club's papers and record books were burnt or stolen.

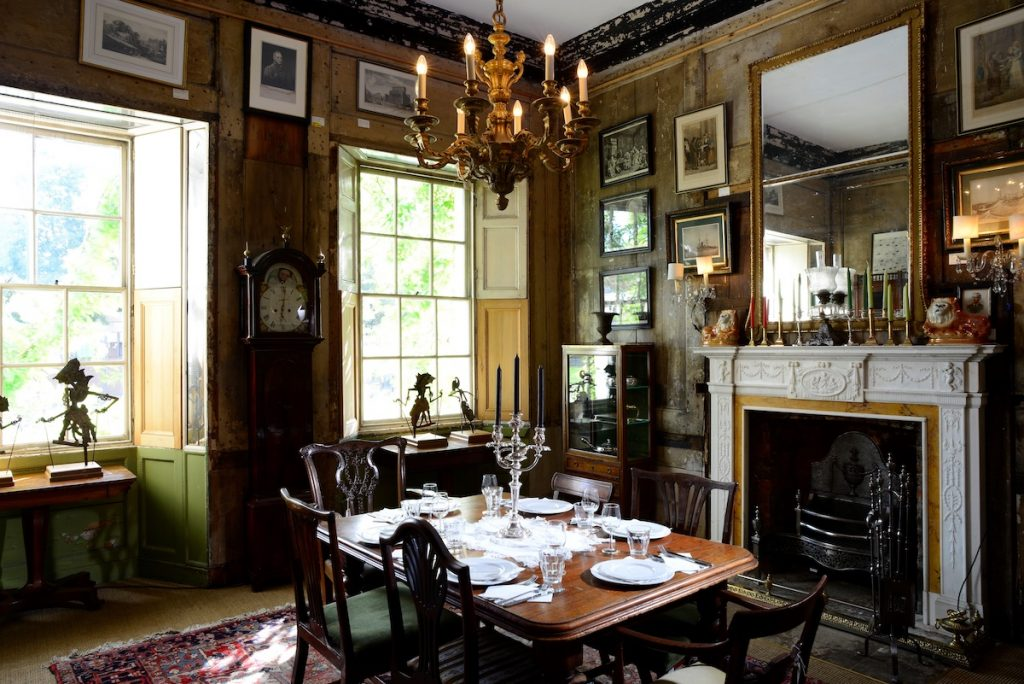
The Study, Brunswick House.

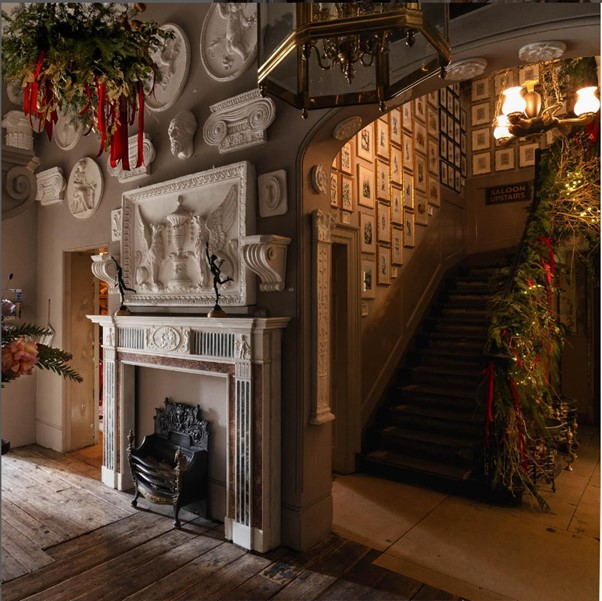
The Entrance Hall, Brunswick House

Since then a major restoration programme has seen the building brought back into use and is now home to the Brunswick House Cafe and antique showrooms run by the London Architectural Salvage and Supply Co (LASSCO).
