= Turton baronets =

Set index for Turton baronets

There have been two baronetcies created for persons with the surname Turton, one in the Baronetage of Great Britain and one in the Baronetage of the United Kingdom. Both creations are extinct.

- Turton baronets of Starborough Castle (1796)
- Turton baronets of Upsall (1926): see Sir Edmund Russborough Turton, 1st Baronet (1857–1929)
