= Mary Hayley =

English businesswoman (1728–1808)

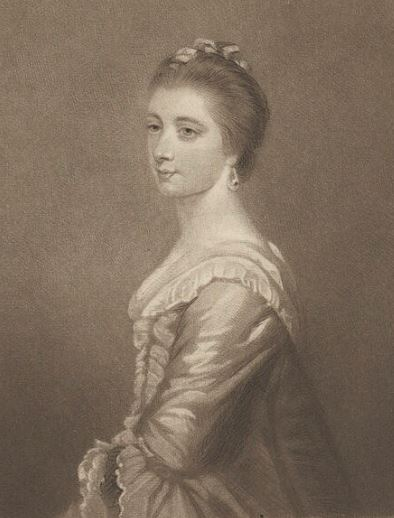
- Engraving by Samuel William Reynolds (1821) of "Mary Wilkes (Mrs. Hayley)" by Sir Joshua Reynolds (1763)
- Born: Mary Wilkes; 30 October 1728; Clerkenwell, London, England
- Died: 9 May 1808 (aged 79); Bath, England
- Other names: Mary Storke, Mary Haley, Madame Hayley, Mary Jeffery, Mary Hayley Jeffrey, Mary Jeffries
- Occupation: Businesswoman
- Years active: 1781–1792
- Relatives: John Wilkes (brother)

Signature
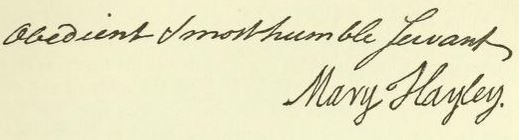

Mary Hayley (née Wilkes; 30 October 1728 – 9 May 1808) was an English businesswoman. She parlayed an inheritance from her first husband into a sizeable estate with her second husband. Upon the latter's death, she took over the business and successfully operated a shipping firm from 1781 to 1792 before living out her life in Bath.

Hayley was born in 1728 in London to the prosperous distiller Israel Wilkes junior and was a sister to the politician John Wilkes. Kind-hearted but opinionated, she lived an unconventional life and was known for her astute observation and discussion, based upon her wide reading. Refusing to bow to custom, she attended trials at the Old Bailey and travelled throughout Britain to satisfy her wide-ranging curiosity. Marrying a widower, Samuel Storke junior, in 1752, she became a widow within the year with a young step-son. As her husband's sole heir, she inherited his business and soon after his death married his chief clerk, George Hayley. He turned out to be a shrewd businessman, increasing her inherited wealth tenfold during his lifetime. Their business established extensive trade relationships with the American colonies, supplying the tea which gained infamy in the Boston Tea Party.

After her second husband's death and the end of the American Revolution, American merchants owed Hayley a large debt and she became one of the few Britons who successfully recouped their losses after the war. In 1784, she purchased a frigate used by both the Continental Navy and the Royal Navy and had it refurbished as a whaling and sealing vessel. She rechristened the frigate the United States and moved to Boston, where she lived for eight years. Unusually for women at the time, she became a benefactor, donating money and goods to charitable endeavours, and ran a whaling business. Her first venture, a voyage to the Falkland Islands, resulted in a shipment of whale oil, which was seized by the British government in 1785. She successfully recouped her losses from the Crown, as it was unable to prove that she owed duty, as British merchants were exempt if one-third of their crew was also British.

In 1786, Hayley married a Scottish merchant in Boston, Patrick Jeffrey. In 1792, she left him and returned to England with the stipulation that he never again appear in her presence. After a brief stay in London, she lived out her days in Bath.

== Early life ==
Mary Wilkes was born on 30 October 1728 in the Clerkenwell area of London, as the next to youngest child of Sarah Heaton and Israel Wilkes. Her mother was the daughter of a prosperous tanner and her father was a distiller. Her siblings included Sarah (1721-1767), known as Sally, who was said to have been the inspiration for Charles Dickens’ character Miss Havisham in Great Expectations. Among the others were Israel III (1722–1805); John (1725–1797) a prominent politician; Heaton (1727-1803) born 20 months before Mary; and Ann (1736–1750), who died from smallpox at the age of 14. Mary was known for her kind heart but also for her fiery outbursts and limited self-control, which may have been caused by severe headaches.

Wilkes, who was widely read and enjoyed critical discussion, was known for her astute observation and sound judgment. She had little use for either religion or other women, preferring to surround herself with the company of eminent male writers and scholars. She had a reserved seat at the Old Bailey, where she attended trials. The court tried felony cases, those for which the death penalty could be imposed. Flaunting convention, she refused to withdraw with the other ladies when evidence or discussion was deemed unsuitable for women to hear. Her curiosity compelled her to travel widely in Britain each summer in order to improve her knowledge. Though used to living in luxury, she was interested in "manufactories, manners, high and low, and worse than low", desiring to "see everybody and everything". Politically, Wilkes was an ally of her brother, John, and supported both civil liberties and curtailment of the Crown's power. As such, she supported the rights of the American colonies and was acquainted with a wide range of prominent American figures.

== Married life ==
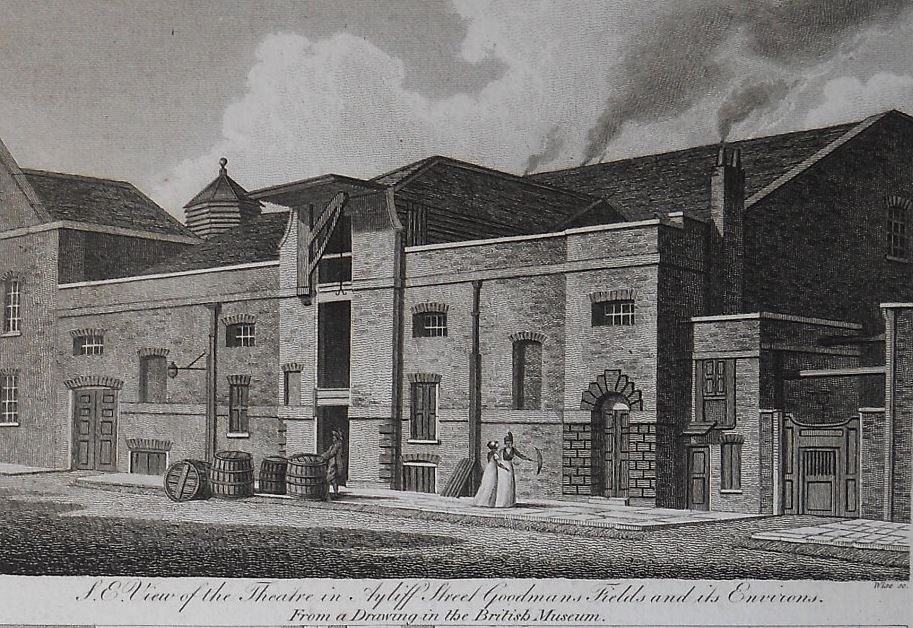
Great Ayliff Street on Goodman's Fields, London

On 18 June 1752, she married Samuel Storke junior (Note: The History of Parliament gives the name of Wilkes' first husband erroneously as Alexander Stock. The business relationships of Storke/Hayley and Storke/Hayley/Champion indicate that the entry in History of Parliament is incorrect, as do various biographical accounts of John Wilkes, which identify Mary's first husband as Storke or Stork and her obituary.) who had inherited from his father Samuel one of the leading London trading firms doing business with New England and the British West Indies. Storke had previously been married to a Miss Jones, and had a two-year-old son, Richard (1751–1767). Within a year of the marriage he died, leaving her an inheritance of £15,000, as well as a life interest in his former wife's estates in Monmouthshire and Gloucestershire. Soon after being widowed, Storke married the former clerk and negotiator in her husband's office, George Hayley.

Upon their marriage, Mary Hayley's inheritance became her new husband's property and he entered into a business arrangement with Storke's former business associate, Alexander Champion. George had been apprenticed to Storke and with the marriage rose from "rags to riches". While her husband ran the businesses, Hayley continued to indulge her interests in intellectual conversation, attending trials, travelling widely and going to the theatre. She enjoyed racing around London in her coach at breakneck speeds. In addition to their home in London's Great Ayliff Street, the couple had a residence in Bromley.

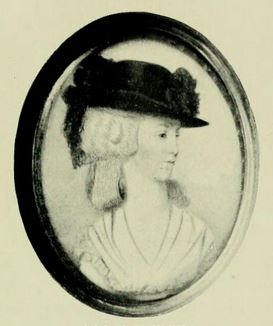
Dinah, Hayley's only child, later Lady Baker

In 1759, she gave birth to her only surviving child, a daughter, Dinah, with whom she would have a tempestuous relationship. Two sons and a daughter born to the Hayleys died in infancy.

George Hayley used his wife's money well, becoming one of the wealthiest merchants in London, one time president of Lloyd's of London, and a member of the House of Commons from 1774 to 1781. Mary Hayley brought her husband into the social and political circle of her brother John, and though George was taciturn in public and in their private life, he was aggressive in his business dealings. He operated at 9 Laurence Pountney Lane, as George Hayley and at 18 Great Ayliff (now Alie) Street on Goodman's Fields, he operated as both Hayley and Rotch and as Hayley and Hopkins. The firm was involved in the importation of whale oil from the American Colonies and had extensive business dealings with the New Bedford and Nantucket Rotch family, becoming a business partner of Francis Rotch in operating the Falkland Fleet. Rotch and Hayley owned several ships together, including the Abigail, the America, and the Egmont. Hayley also owned a ship with John Hancock, which was used to transport tea to the colonies. In addition, Hayley acted as a broker and agent for other cargo on ships owned by Hancock and Rotch. As such, when Rotch's ship the Dartmouth delivered a shipment of whale oil to London in 1773, it was Hayley who arranged for tea to be loaded for the return voyage. That ship became one of the vessels involved in the Boston Tea Party. (Note: Druett states that Hayley owned the Beaver, Dartmouth, Eleanor and William, the four ships involved in the Boston Tea Party. The Beaver was built and originally owned by William Rotch and at the time of the Tea Party was owned by Harrison & Company; the Dartmouth was owned by Aaron Lopes, Leonard Jarvis and Francis Rotch; the Eleanor was owned by the Boston merchant, John Rowe, and the William, which was shipwrecked in Cape Cod, near Provincetown, Massachusetts, never arriving in Boston, was owned by Richard Clarke.)

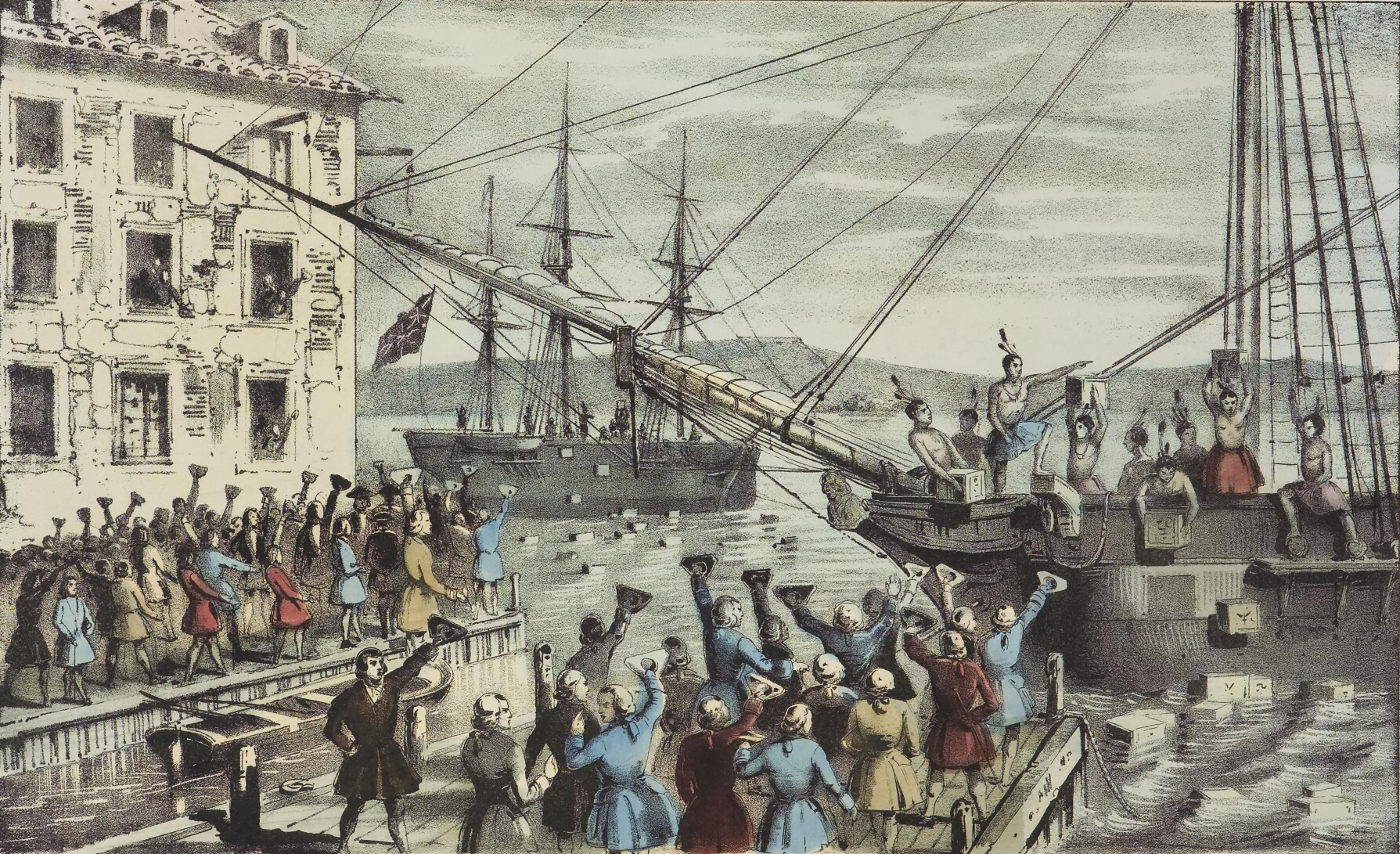
The Boston Tea Party as shown in Britain

Since the governor of Massachusetts closed Boston Harbor as a result of the rebellion, Rotch and Hayley, along with Alexander, Benjamin and Richard Champion; Thomas Dickason; Samuel Enderby and Samuel Enderby, Junior; and John St Barbe formed the British Southern Whale Fishery, also known as the South Sea Whale Fishery. In 1775, Rotch assembled the Falklands Fleet, containing 16 or 17 ships in order to establish a whaling base in the Falkland Islands. Rotch negotiated with Hayley to market the whale oil and after travelling to London to secure government protection of their ships and crew from seizure, joined the fleet off the coast of Brazil. He returned to London with the fleet in 1777. As a Quaker and a pacifist, Rotch did not participate in the American Revolution which had just begun. He became Hayley's chief clerk and a permanent houseguest in the Hayley home.

== In America ==
In 1781, George Hayley died and Mary took over the business, writing letters to his former business associates to assure them her firm would continue to serve them. Rotch served as her business advisor, personal companion, and they became betrothed. Hayley proved to be an astute businesswoman and by routing her funds from America, through neutral banks in France, was able to reclaim a large portion of her nearly £100,000 left from George's investments. Three years after George's death, the strained relationship between Hayley and her daughter erupted over settlement of George's will. In 1783, Dinah had married a captain of the Devon Militia, Robert Baker, whom Hayley considered a fortune-hunter because he was deeply in debt. To escape his creditors, he had taken Dinah to Saint-Omer, France, and filed suit to collect Dinah's inheritance from Hayley. After arriving in Boston and hearing of the impending birth of her first grandchild, Hayley sent money to the couple and a conciliatory note. (Note: Baker became a baronet in 1796, and the father of Sir Henry Baker, 2nd Baronet.)

Upon the conclusion of the American Revolutionary War, Hayley and Rotch made a plan to sail for the United States to attempt to collect around £20,000 still owed to her. Hayley wrote to her business partners informing them that she was leaving Alexander Champion, junior in charge of her affairs in London for the duration of her sojourn abroad. She purchased a frigate known as the Delaware which had been built in Philadelphia in 1776, but was captured by the British during the Chesapeake Bay blockade and after the war was sold by the British Navy. They sailed from Falmouth in April, arriving in Boston within 37 days on the ship which had been rechristened the United States.

Hayley, who may have accepted an offer to stay with Dorothy Quincy and her husband John Hancock when she arrived, took up residence in Boston, leasing a house and fitting it out with a collection of American furniture and artworks. She also purchased a summerhouse in Providence. She was quick to pursue relationships with her business partners and gain a favourable reputation with Boston's elite through efforts such as giving Hancock a new coach. In October 1784, she hosted a fireworks display to commemorate the third anniversary of the surrender at Yorktown by Cornwallis. Hayley spent her first Christmas in America with Catharine Macaulay, Nathanael Greene, Lafayette and George Washington, first visiting Washington's Mount Vernon estate in Virginia and then accompanying the party to New England. Unusual for a woman at the time, Hayley also became a benefactor to the poor and contributed to numerous charitable endeavours, including providing funds to care for both veterans of the war and widows; wood for the poor; blankets for prisoners; and donating money to a Charlestown meeting house and to a fund financing improvements of Boston Common. She also was one of the founders of the Massachusetts Humane Society, which was organised to save drowning victims. By July 1785, she had successfully recovered all debts owed to her.

Meanwhile, the United States sailed on to Nantucket, where it was outfitted for sealing. Rotch engaged a crew and the ship sailed under Captain Benjamin Hussey to the Falklands by the end of 1784. Completing its fishing, the United States returned to London in 1785, but upon its arrival the cargo was seized over a dispute on the duty. Hayley claimed no duty was due as she was a British subject and owned the boat and at least one-third of the crew were British subjects. A trial ensued and finally in 1786, the Crown lost its case and was obligated to pay Hayley £4,000 damages. (Note: Dickinson reports that the oil from this venture was returned to London on a boat named Maria and owned by Rotch, noting that customs agents refused to allow the oil to be sold in London having discovered a subterfuge committed by Rotch and Hayley, who claimed that the cargo was duty free because Hayley, was a British subject. The Maria then sailed to Dunkirk and sold the cargo without paying duty with the agreement that Rotch would establish trade between Nantucket and France. Given the report in The Public Advertiser of the events and the court finding in favour of Hayley, it appears that the two ships were confused by Dickinson and Hayley's United States cargo was seized. Further credence that Hayley was not involved is the 1784 letter from Hayley indicating that her business affairs in London were being handled by Champion rather than Rotch and a letter written by Champion under direction from Hayley. Champion wrote to Christopher Champlin on 26 August 1784, advising him that per Hayley there was no hope that oil imported from America would be able to enter Britain without paying the proper duty.) In 1786, Rotch and Hayley parted ways. He had gone to England in 1785 and went on to France to develop business interests there. Hayley remained in Boston and on 14 June 1786, married Patrick J. Jeffrey, (c. 1748–1812) a Scotsman and the uncle of Francis Jeffrey (later Lord Jeffrey) . Patrick was in America to collect debts owed to a British creditor. (Note: Druett reported that Hayley married Jeffrey, "a wealthy Bostonian", in December 1784, upon the departure of Rotch for Nantucket to visit family. Fitzgerald also reports that soon after arriving in America, Rotch returned to England to "secure property left behind" for Hayley and "… in one short week after his departure she had united herself" in marriage with an agent he had left in charge of her affairs. Given the marriage record showing that the event did not take place until 1786, and the newspaper report from Leeds indicating he was Scottish, both reports appear erroneous. Rotch's return to England may have had to do with his own ship Maria's difficulty.) Gossip about her appearance and whether he had married her for her money began to appear in the press around the same time as she married Patrick Jeffrey, who was more than twenty years her junior, but in the beginning of their relationship they appeared devoted.

Jeffrey, as she was now styled, continued to enjoy travel and went on numerous excursions throughout the US with Catharine Macaulay. Jeffrey sold the United States to DeBauque Brothers in late 1786. In 1791, Patrick, who was now the partner of Joseph Russell junior in a Boston mercantile firm, sailed to Madeira for his health. He returned in May 1792 and within six months, Jeffrey would sail for England without him.

== Return to England ==
Jeffrey returned briefly to London and then retired to Bath, where she lived in a fashionable style in her home on Gay Street. She did not divorce her husband, which would have required an act of parliament, but they lived apart. One story says she agreed to pay him £10,000 if he would never set foot in England during her lifetime. Another reports that Patrick Jeffrey gave her an allowance while he remained in Boston living off her money like a king in the mansion of the former royal governor, Thomas Hutchinson. Jeffrey's only child, Lady Dinah died in 1805, leaving six children, and her obituary omits any mention of her mother. One of these grandchildren was Sir Henry Baker, 2nd Baronet, who served in the Royal Navy in the War of 1812.

== Death and legacy ==
Jeffrey died on 9 May 1808 at her home in Bath. Though her story would go largely unknown, she was one of the few women engaged in trade between Britain and the American colonies, as well as the burgeoning United States. At the end of the American Revolution, British merchants were owed between £2,500,000 and £5,000,000 depending on the interest due for the duration of the war. Lacking a federal mechanism, most British creditors had to engage with different state governments, limiting their ability to collect. Jeffrey was one of the few creditors who managed to recoup their losses in the immediate post-war period.
