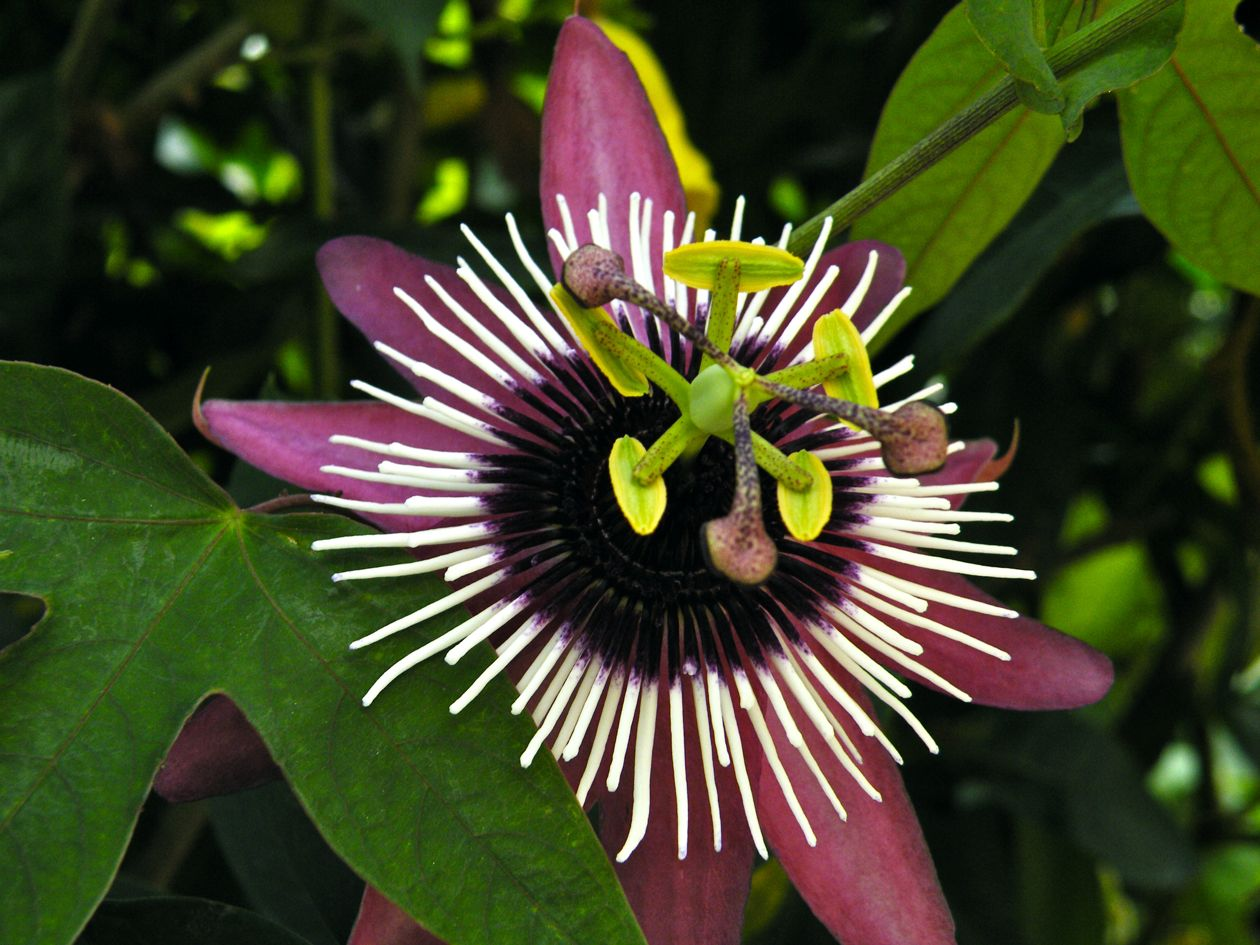

Scientific classification
- Kingdom: Plantae
- Clade: Tracheophytes
- Clade: Angiosperms
- Clade: Eudicots
- Clade: Rosids
- Order: Malpighiales
- Family: Passifloraceae
- Genus: Passiflora
- Species: P. × violacea

Binomial name
- Passiflora × violacea Loisel.

= Passiflora × violacea =

Species of vine

Passiflora × violacea, the violet passion flower, is a hybrid between two species of flowering plants, Passiflora racemosa × Passiflora caerulea, in the family Passifloraceae.

It is an evergreen climber growing to 6 m (20 ft) with five-lobed leaves, clinging spiral tendrils, large showy purple flowers with maroon and white filaments, and the prominent stigmas and anthers typical of the genus. While somewhat hardier than one of its parents, P. racemosa, it is considerably less hardy than the other, P. caerulea (which can be grown outside in warm or coastal areas). P. × violacea will tolerate temperatures down to −1 °C (30 °F), but in most temperate zones is grown under glass, for instance in an unheated conservatory or greenhouse.

Passiflora × violacea may well be the very first Passiflora to have been hybridised, by the British nurseryman Thomas Milne, in 1819. It was subsequently described by Joseph Sabine of the Royal Horticultural Society, then in 1824 by the French botanist Jean-Louis-Auguste Loiseleur-Deslongchamps in the "Herbier General de l'Amateur", giving it its current name.

This hybrid has in its turn given rise to several cultivars, notably 'Victoria'. It has won the Royal Horticultural Society's Award of Garden Merit.
