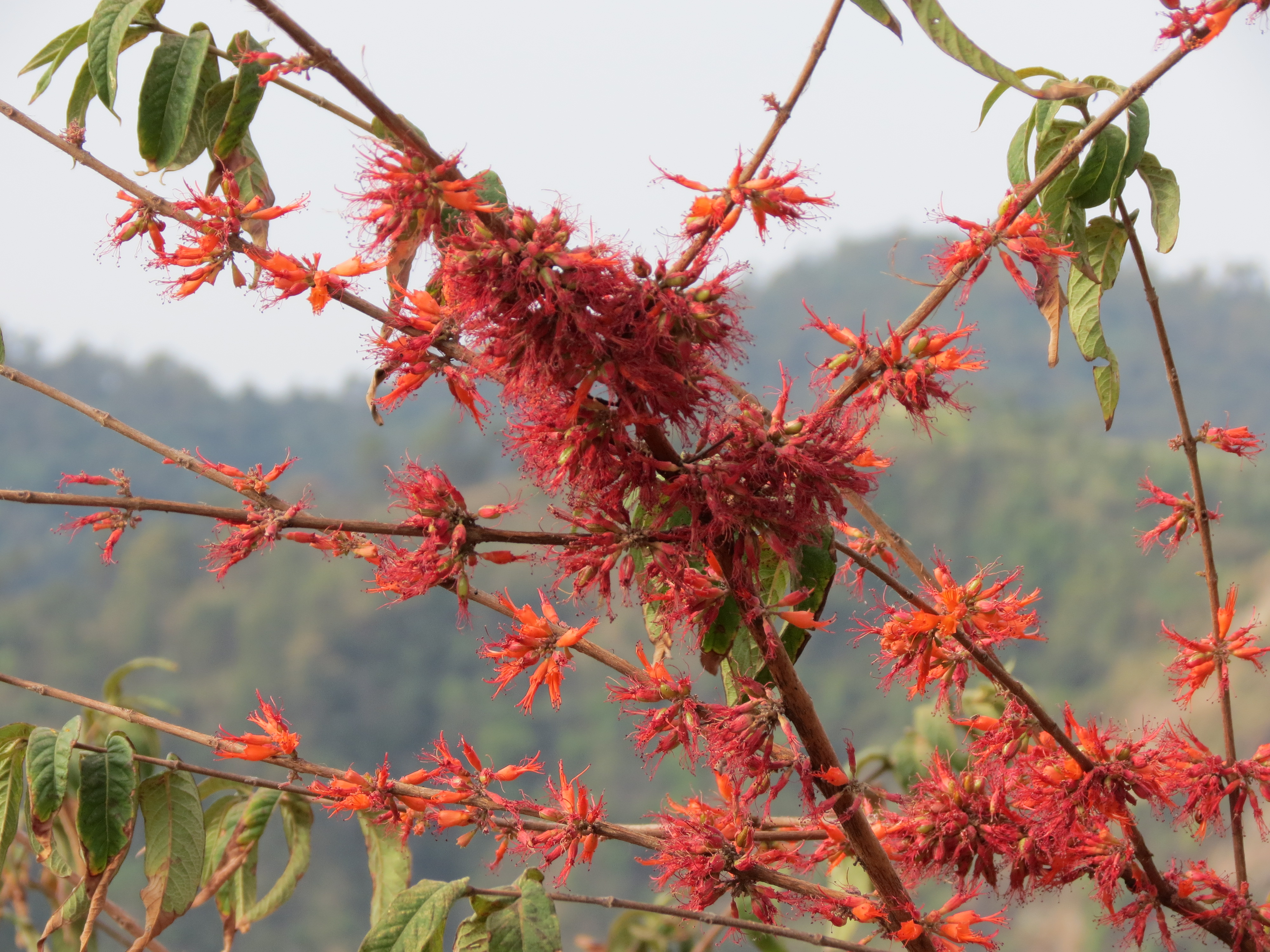
- Woodfordia fruticosa

Scientific classification
- Kingdom: Plantae
- Clade: Tracheophytes
- Clade: Angiosperms
- Clade: Eudicots
- Clade: Rosids
- Order: Myrtales
- Family: Lythraceae
- Subfamily: Lythroideae
- Genus: Woodfordia; Salisb.

= Woodfordia (plant) =

Genus of flowering plants

Woodfordia is a genus of flowering plant in the family Lythraceae.

It is native to South and Southeast Asia and is named for the English botanist and ornithologist Emperor John Woodford.

== Species ==
- Woodfordia floribunda (unresolved)
- Woodfordia fruticosa (L.) Kurz (= W. tomentosa)
- Woodfordia uniflora (A. Rich.) Koehne
