= HMS Otter (1778) =

Sloop of the Royal Navy

History

France
- Name: Glanure
- Captured: 24 February 1778

Great Britain
- Name: HMS Otter
- Namesake: Otter
- Acquired: 1778 by purchase of a prize
- Fate: Sold 1783

Great Britain
- Name: Cyclops
- Namesake: Cyclopes
- Acquired: By purchase
- Captured: 15 December 1795

General characteristics
- Tons burthen: 230, or 297, or 345 (bm)
- Complement: RN: 121; Slaver: 1793:45; 1795:15
- Armament: RN: 14 guns; Slaver: 1793: 18 × 6-pounder guns; 1795: 8 × 6&9-pounder guns

HMS Otter was the French merchantman Glanure, which the Royal Navy (RN) captured early in 1778. The Royal Navy took her into service as the sloop HMS Otter and she served in the American theatre. The Navy sold her in 1783. She became a merchantman and then a slave ship in the triangular trade in enslaved people. She made two complete voyages bringing captives to Jamaica. The French captured her in December 1795 as she was on her way to deliver her third cargo of captives.

== Origins ==
A key source states that Otter was the American ship Gleneur, captured in 1778. There is no record of Royal Navy vessels ever capturing a Gleneur, or a Glaneur in 1778; there is evidence for the capture of a French vessel named Glanure.

HMS Lizard and HMS Perseus captured the French ship Glanure on 24 February 1778. At 6 a.m. Perseus, Captain Elphinstone was about seven or eight leagues SSW of the Charlestown Light when she sighted a strange sail making for the Charlestown Bar and gave chase. Lizard had joined Perseus. The winds were calm and Perseus had to lower her boats so that they could tow her. Lizard captured the quarry at about 2 p.m. Perseus came up at 4 p.m. The quarry was Glanure, sailing from Rochelle to Charlestown with a cargo of dry goods and salt. Perseus took the 43 man crew on board and Lizard took Glanure to St Augustine, arriving there on 9 March.

== HMS Otter ==
The Royal Navy purchased Glanure at Boston for £3091 10s. It then commissioned her in December under Commander Richard Creyke. She was variously referred to as an armed ship, or a sloop.

In August 1778 Otter captured the brig Margaritta, which she sent to New York.

While under the orders of Commodore Sir George Collier, in May 1779 Otter assisted at the capture and destruction of the towns of Norfolk, Suffolk, Portsmouth, Gosport, and others of less note in the vicinity of Elizabeth River; the strong posts of Stoney Point, Fort la Fayette, and Varplanks, up the North River; and the towns of Newhaven, Fairfield, Norwalk, and Greenfield, on the Connecticut shore; together with an immense quantity of shipping, merchandise, provisions, and naval and military stores. In particular Captain Creyke took a small group of vessels up the main branch of the Chesapeake. They destroyed many vessels, including two with 200 hogsheads of tobacco.

On 9 May 1779 Otter captured the polacre Nancy (alias Berlin).

Otter also accompanied Sir George Collier to the Penobscot river, where nineteen sail of American armed vessels, and upwards of twenty transports, were either taken or destroyed, in August 1779.

On 21 and 23 April 1780 Iris, Delaware, and Otter captured the American privateers Amazon, General Wayne, and Neptune. The capture had taken place a few leagues from Sandy Hook and Iris and Delaware brought them into New York on 1 May. (Note: Amazon, of eight guns, had a crew of 30 or 50 men under the command of Captain Noah Stoddard. She was a brigantine that had received a letter of marque on 27 March 1780 from Massachusetts. General Wayne, of 12 guns, had a crew of 45 men under the command of Captain Price (or John Rice). She was a Pennsylvania letter of marque. Neptune, of 16 guns, had a crew of 100 men under the command of Captain Young.)

Otter was among the vessels sharing in the prize money for the capture in October and November 1780 of the brigantines Surprise and Peggy, and the schooner Neilson.

On 25 January 1781 HMS Blonde, Captain Andrew Barkley, Otter, and Delight, as well as some smaller vessels, carried 300 troops from Charleston to the Cape Fear River. The troops, together with 80 marines, temporarily occupied Wilmington, North Carolina on 28 January. The object of the expedition was to establish sea communications with Lord Cornwallis and provide a base for the army, which was moving north.

HMS Vulture and Otter captured the brig Granada on 28 November 1781.

Creyke was promoted to post captain on 17 December 1782, but already in April 1782 R.Murray had replaced Creyke in command of Otter.

Disposal: The Navy sold Otter on 9 October 1783 for £735 12s 5d.

== Cyclops ==
=== Merchantman ===
Although the Navy had sold Otter in 1783, she did not enter Lloyd's Register (LR) until 1787. The entry showed Cyclops with T.Foster, master, M'Clean, owner, and trade Greenock–Liverpool. It showed her as a French prize and the former man-of-war Otter.

Year	Master	Owner	Trade	Source
1789	H.Currie	P.Freeland	Liverpool–Charleston	LR
1790	H.Currie; E.Peacock	P.Freeland; J.Jackson	Liverpool–South Carolina	LR
1791	E.Peacock; J.Threllfall	J.Jackson; Gregson & Co.	Liverpool–Africa; Liverpool–Africa	LR

=== Enslaver ===
1st enslaving voyage (1791–1792): Captain Joseph Threlfall sailed from Liverpool on 4 May 1791. She started acquiring her captives in Africa on 9 July, and sailed from Africa on 1 September. She had embarked 437 captives at Calabar and she delivered 349 to Kingston, Jamaica on 13 November. This represented a 20% mortalitybrate. She sailed from on 20 December and arrived back at Liverpool on 15 February 1792. She had left Liverpool with 24 crew members and lost none of them on the voyage.

2nd slave voyage (1793–1794): War with France commenced a few months before Cyclopes sailed again. Captain Patrick Fairweather acquired a letter of marque on 6 June 1793. He sailed from Liverpool on 13 June. Cyclops acquired captives at Bassa and then Calabar. She left on 27 July, having embarked 339 captives, and on 15 October delivered 204 to Kingston. This represented a 40% mortality rate. She sailed from Kingston on 26 February 1794 and arrived back at Liverpool on 17 March. She had left Liverpool with 30 crew members and suffered 16 crew deaths on the voyage.

3rd enslaving voyage (1795–Loss): Captain William Grice acquired a letter of marque on 2 January 1795. Cyclops sailed from Liverpool on 7 January. She gathered her captives at Ambriz.

== Fate ==
A privateer captured three British slave ships off the west coast of Hispaniola on about 15 December 1795 as they were on their way to Jamaica. Cyclops, Grice, master, carrying 470 captives, was one of the three. African Queen, Williams, master, was carrying 411 captives. Lastly, Dispatch, Jackson, master, was carrying 250 captives.

In 1795, 50 British slave ships were lost. This was the largest annual loss in the period 1793 to 1807. Seven slave ships were lost on their way from Africa to the West Indies. During the period 1793 to 1807, war, rather than maritime hazards or resistance by the captives, was the greatest cause of vessel losses among British slave vessels.
