= Dispatch (1784 ship) =

History

Great Britain
- Name: Dispatch
- Builder: Bermuda
- Launched: 1784
- Captured: December 1795

General characteristics
- Tons burthen: 73, or 90 (bm)
- Complement: 1793 (April):45; 1793 (October):12
- Armament: 1793 (April): 14 × 3-pounder guns; 1793 (October): 6 × 3&4-pounder guns

Dispatch was built in Bermuda in 1784, and came to England possibly as early as 1786. In 1792, she made a voyage as a slave ship carrying slaves from Africa to the West Indies in the triangular trade of enslaved people. She was then briefly a privateer before returning to the slave trade. The French captured her in 1795, while she was on her third slave trading voyage.

== Career ==
Dispatch first appeared in Lloyd's Register (LR) in 1789. Missing issues or missing pages in extant issues mean she may have appeared earlier. Dispatch, Croke, master, first appeared in the ship arrival and departure (SAD) data in Lloyd's List (LL) in 1787.

Year	Master	Owner	Trade	Source
1789	N.Croke	Kough	Ross–Portsmouth	LR
1791	N.Croke	Kough	Ross–Portsmouth	LR

1st enslaving voyage (1792–1793): Captain Caleb Gardner sailed from Liverpool to Africa on 7 May 1792. Dispatch arrived at Saint Ann's Bay, Jamaica on 23 November. There she delivered an estimated 200 captives. She sailed for home on 1 January 1793, and arrived back at Liverpool on 15 February 1793. She had left Liverpool with 15 crew members and suffered one crew member death on her voyage.

Shortly after Dispatch returned, war with France broke out. Her owners decided to send her privateering.

Year	Master	Owner	Trade	Source
1793	J.Gardner; J.Bellis	Gregson & Co. Case & Co.	Liverpool–Africa	LR
1794	J.Bellis	Case & Co.	Liverpool privateer	LR

Captain John Bollis acquired a letter of marque on 30 April 1793. LL carried only one mention of her taking a prize. In July, the "Dispatch privateer", of Liverpool, recaptured Three Brothers, of Dartmouth, which was laden with fish. Three Brothers had been on her way from Bergen to Venice with a cargo of stockfish when she had been captured.

Dispatch's owners removed her from privateering. On 31 October, Captain Edward Jackson acquired a letter of marque, but with a third fewer men and guns than before. She then returned to the slave trade.

Year	Master	Owner	Trade	Source
1793	E.Jackson	Case & Co.	Liverpool–Africa	LR; large repair 1794

2nd enslaving voyage (1793–1794): Captain Edward Jackson sailed from Liverpool on 22 December 1793, bound for West Africa. Dispatch arrived at Kingston on 15 June 1794. There she landed 146 captives. She sailed from Kingston on 9 July 1794, and arrived at Liverpool on 18 September 1794. She had left Liverpool with 17 crew members and suffered one crew death on the voyage.

3rd enslaving voyage (1794–loss): Captain Jackson sailed from Liverpool on 20 November 1794, bound for Malembo. She sailed from Africa on 1 November. (Note: Dispatch, Jackson, master, does not appear on the lists of vessels cleared out to Africa from English ports during the period 1796 to 1807.)

== Fate ==
Lloyd's List reported that a French privateer had captured three British slave ships off the west coast of Hispaniola on about 15 December 1795, as they were on their way to Jamaica. Dispatch, Jackson, master, was carrying 250 captives. Cyclops, Grice, master, was carrying 470 captives. African Queen, Williams, master, was carrying 411 captives.

Dispatch arrived at Saint Vincent, most of which was then under French control as a result of the Second Carib War. There Dispatch landed 158 captives on 1 December.

In 1795, 50 British enslaving ships were lost. This was the largest annual loss in the period 1793 to 1807. Seven enslaving slave ships were lost on their way from Africa to the West Indies. Still, During the period 1793 to 1807, war, rather than maritime hazards or resistance by the captives, was the greatest cause of vessel losses among British slave vessels.
