= African Queen (1792 ship) =

Slave ship

History

Great Britain
- Name: African Queen
- Owner: 1792:James Rodgers; 1794:John Anderson & Charles Young; 1795:John Anderson
- Builder: Folkestone
- Launched: 1780
- Captured: December 1795

General characteristics
- Tons burthen: 277 (bm)
- Armament: 16 × 4&3-pounder guns

African Queen was built at Folkestone in 1780, though almost surely under a different name. In 1792, she became a Bristol-based slave ship in the triangular trade in enslaved people. She made two complete voyages transporting enslaved people. On the first of these voyages she suffered a high mortality, both among her captives and her captains and crew. A privateer captured her in 1795 as she was on her way to Jamaica with captives while on her third voyage transporting enslaved people.

== Career ==
African Queen first appeared in Lloyd's Register (LR) in 1793 with Williams, master, J.Anderson, owner, and trade Bristol–Africa. It gave her origin as Folkestone and her launch year as 1783. She had been rebuilt in 1785, and had undergone lengthening and a "good repair" in 1791. However, the 1796 volume amended the launch year to 1780.

1st voyage transporting enslaved people (1792–1793): Actually, African Queen left Bristol on her first voyage to acquire and transport enslaved people on 16 January 1792. She left with 37 crew members and enlisted three more on 3 March on the African coast. She had arrived at Old Calabar on 17–18 March, and she acquired captives there. While she was acquiring captives at least 21 crew members died, including two captains in succession. Captain Samuel Stibling died on 14 May, and Captain Hamet Forsyth, who had replaced Stribling, died on 1 October. While African Queen was on the coast she employed two smaller vessels, Dragon, and Fame, as ship's tenders.

African Queen sailed from the coast of Africa either on 10 October or 11 November. Captain James Lloyd, who had replaced Forsyth, died at sea on 1 December; (Note: Lloyd had sailed on voyage transporting enslaved people the year before as a ship's surgeon.) Captain Long, originally her third mate, took command. She arrived at Montego Bay, Jamaica, on 18 January 1793. She had embarked 330 captives and she landed 214, for a mortality rate of 35%.

Of the 116 captives that died, 78 had died before African Queen could stop at Dominica for refreshments; 38 died on the leg between Dominica and Jamaica. She had spent eight months on the coast, much of it during hot weather. Both then and during the voyage the loss of crew members, including the ship's surgeon, meant that sanitation measures fell behind and captives could not be brought on deck for air. After African Queen arrived at Kingston it took several days before she could dock. In the twelve days before the captives were sold, another 11 captives died. One captive was identified as "pawn", that is, he had been pledged as security by a merchant in Africa, and so legally was not property of the vessel's owners. The young man remained on board African Queen to go to Bristol, and from there, eventually back to Africa. The sale of the remaining 202 captives took three days. The 65 men, 74 women, five adolescents, and 58 children sold for £7,800; James Rodger's, the vessel's owner had invested an initial £10,650 in the voyage.

At Montego Bay African Queen discharged three crew men and enlisted two. She left Jamaica with 19 crew members. She left on 11 March and arrived back at Bristol on 6 May.

2nd voyage transporting enslaved people (1794–1795): Captain Thomas Williams acquired a letter of marque on 13 June 1794. Williams, of Bristol, sailed for the firm John and Alexander Anderson & Co. on four different slave ships. Before taking command of African Queen, Williams was captain of Active for two voyages.

Williams sailed from Bristol on 28 June 1794, bound for West Africa. African Queen acquired 411 captives at Calabar. She arrived at Grenada on 19 October and landed 401 captives, for a mortality rate of about 1%. She had left Bristol with 31 crew members and suffered two crew deaths by the time she reached Grenada. African Queen sailed from Grenada on 18 November and arrived back at Bristol on 12 January 1795.

The Slave Trade Act 1788 (Dolben's Act) was the first British legislation passed to regulate the shipping of enslaved people. One of the provisions of the act was bonuses for the master (£100) and surgeon (£50) if the mortality among the captives was under 2%; a mortality rate of under 3% resulted in a bonus of half that. Dolben's Act apparently resulted in some reduction in the numbers of captives carried per vessel, and possibly in mortality, though the evidence is ambiguous. (Note: At the time the monthly wage for a captain of ship out of Bristol transporting enslaved people was £5 per month. That said, masters and surgeons received most of their income in the form of "coast commissions", based on the total number of captives they delivered, plus the income of the sale of two (or more) privilege captives.)

3rd voyage transporting enslaved people (1795): African Queen underwent a second good repair in 1795. Captain Williams then sailed from Bristol on 18 May 1795 bound for West Africa. In 1795, 79 British vessels sailed from British ports on voyages to transport enslaved people. Six of these sailed from Bristol.

African Queen acquired captives in the Sierra Leone estuary.

A privateer captured three British slave ships off the west coast of Hispaniola on about 15 December 1795, as they were on their way to Jamaica. African Queen, Williams, master, was one of the three. She was carrying 411 captives. Cyclops, Grice, master, was carrying 470 captives, and Dispatch, Jackson, master, was carrying 250.

In 1795, 50 British ships in the triangular trade were lost. This was the largest annual loss in the period 1793 to 1807. Seven of these ships were lost on their way from Africa to the West Indies. During the period 1793 to 1807, war, rather than maritime hazards or resistance by the captives, was the greatest cause of vessel losses among British enslaving vessels.
