= St. Columba (tune) =

Traditional Irish melody

St. Columba is a traditional Irish tune. It was first published by George Petrie in 1855, and it was republished in Charles Villiers Stanford's edited compilation of the tunes Petrie collected. It was described as having been "sung on the dedication of a chapel" in County Londonderry. The tune was paired with the hymn The King of Love My Shepherd Is in The English Hymnal (1906), and it rose in popularity with the hymn.

The St Columba melody has also been used as the tune for the Latin hymn 'Labente jam solis rota' by the French hymn writer and poet Charles Coffin, published in 1736 in his Hymni Sacri Auctore Carolo Coffin. It was later translated into English by John Chandler with the first line 'As now the sun's declining rays' and the chorus 'All glory to the Father be'.
