= Hayes baronets of Westminster (1797) =

Escutcheon of the Hayes baronets of Westminster

The Hayes baronetcy, of Westminster, London, was created in the Baronetage of Great Britain on 6 February 1797 for John Hayes, a military physician and Physician-Extraordinary to the Prince of Wales. The title became extinct on the death of the 3rd Baronet in 1896.

== Hayes baronets, of Westminster (1797) ==
- Sir John Macnamara Hayes, 1st Baronet (1750–1809)
- Sir Thomas Pelham Hayes, 2nd Baronet (1794–1851)
- Sir John Warren Hayes, 3rd Baronet (1799–1896), left no male heir. His son, Capt. John Beauchamp Hayes (1849–1884), predeceased him, having had three daughters.

== Notes ==
Baronetage of Great Britain
Preceded by Baker baronets	Hayes baronets of Westminster; 6 February 1797	Succeeded by Pechell baronets
