= USS Delaware (1776) =

Frigate of the Continental Navy

History

United States
- Name: USS Delaware
- Ordered: 13 December 1775
- Builder: Warwick Coates
- Launched: July 1776
- Captured: 27 September 1777

Great Britain
- Name: HMS Delaware
- Acquired: 1777
- Fate: Sold April 1783

Great Britain
- Name: United States
- Acquired: 1783 by purchase
- Fate: Sold 1786

France
- Name: Dauphin
- Acquired: By purchase 1786 or 1788
- Fate: Still in service in 1795

General characteristics
- Class & type: Frigate
- Tons burthen: 560, or 5631/49, or 695 (bm)
- Length: Overall: 117 ft 0 1/2 in (35.7 m); Keel: 98 ft 0 1/2 in (29.9 m) (deck)
- Beam: 32 ft 10 1/2 in (10.0 m)
- Depth of hold: 9 ft 8 1/2 in (3.0 m)
- Propulsion: Sail
- Armament: USN:22 × 12-pounder + 6 × 6-pounder guns; RN:28 × 9-pounder guns; Dauphin:32 guns
- Notes: Built of live oak

USS Delaware was a 24-gun frigate of the Continental Navy that had a short career during the American Revolutionary War as the British Royal Navy captured her in 1777. The Royal Navy took her in as an "armed ship", and later classed her a sixth-rate. The Royal Navy sold her in 1783. British owners named her United States and then French interests purchased her and named her Dauphin. She spent some years as a whaler and then in March 1795 she was converted at Charleston, South Carolina, to French privateer. Her subsequent fate is unclear.

== Continental Navy ==
She was built under the 13 December 1775 order of the Continental Congress in the yard of Warwick Coates of Philadelphia, Pennsylvania, under the direction of the Marine Committee. Upon her launching in July 1776, Captain C. Alexander took command.

Delaware served in the Delaware River, joining with Commodore John Hazelwood's Pennsylvania state ships in operations that delayed the Royal Navy in approaching Philadelphia and supplying British troops. When the British took possession of Philadelphia on 26 September 1777, Delaware, now under the command of John Barry, in company with several smaller ships, advanced upon British fortifications which were being erected and opened fire while anchored some 500 yards from shore.

On 27 September she went aground on the ebb tide and came under concentrated British artillery fire, which led Alexander to strike his colors and surrender to troops under Lord Cornwallis, at the time having 24 guns on the upper deck. Delaware was taken into the Royal Navy. Admiral Lord Richard Howe described her the thirty two gun frigate 25 October 1777 was captured as she attempted to pass above the town, Philadelphia recently taken by troops.

== Royal Navy ==
The Royal Navy bought her from the Prize Court as a sloop and as described by Howe an "armed ship", appointing Lieutenant James Watt of HMS Roebuck to command her. HMS Delaware was later re-classed her a sixth rate.

In April 1778 Commander Christopher Mason commissioned her.

On 1 December 1779 Delaware escorted a convoy of supply ships to Bermuda, and also brought some 100 officers and men of the Royal Garrison Battalion of Veterans to defend Bermuda. She and the troops arrived in time to forestall an American attack. When four American naval vessels arrived later that day they saw Delaware in place and British troops patrolling, and so left quickly.

On 6 June 1779 HMS Daphne captured the American privateer Oliver Cromwell. Delaware and the privateer Union were in company and so shared in the prize money. (Note: The State of Connecticut had financed the construction of Oliver Cromwell. The Hayden shipyards launched her in 1776 and she proceeded to take five prizes before she herself fell prey to Daphne. In the engagement with Daphne Oliver Cromwell had three men killed; a further four died of their wounds. The British renamed her Restoration. There is no record of her serving in the Royal Navy, however, a Restoration appears in Lloyd's Register in 1779. She is a ship of 130 tons (bm), reportedly built in 1777 in America, with R. Crombie, master, and W. Wallace, owner. Her trade is Liverpool—New York.)

On 21 and 23 April 1780 Iris, Delaware, and Otter captured the American privateers Amazon, General Wayne, and Neptune. The capture had taken place a few leagues from Sandy Hook and Iris and Delaware brought them into New York on 1 May. (Note: Amazon, of eight guns, had a crew of 30 or 50 men under the command of Captain Noah Stoddard. She was a brigantine that had received a letter of marque on 27 March 1780 from Massachusetts. General Wayne, of 12 guns, had a crew of 45 men under the command of Captain Price (or John Rice). She was a Pennsylvania letter of marque. Neptune, of 16 guns, had a crew of 100 men under the command of Captain Young.)

== United States ==
The Royal Navy sold Delaware on 14 April 1783 for £300 to Mary Hayley, who renamed her United States. She sailed from Falmouth to Boston in April 1784. Hayley had the boat fitted out as a whaler and seal hunting vessel, shipping to the Falkland Islands in late 1784. The ship returned in 1785 with a cargo of whale oil, which was seized by customs agents. After a trial, the Crown lost its case against Hayley for duty, as she was a British citizen, and was ordered to pay her £4,000 for her losses.

United States first appeared in Lloyd's Register (LR) in 1786 with J.Scott, master, Mrs Hayley, owner, and trade London–Boston. She had undergone a thorough repair in 1784. She was no longer listed in LR in 1787.

In the fall of 1786, Francis Rotch reported that Hayley had sold the United States to the firm Brothers DeBauque and that he had advised them to send the ship to the Falklands rather than Greenland.

== Dauphin ==
United States may have operated under both that name, and under Dauphin for some years.

French records that show Dauphin in 1785 with Paul Coffin, master. She was described as a frigate of 695 tons. Her known ports of call included Lorient (1792), New Bedford (November 1792), then Brazil, Delagoa Bay, Saint-Laurent Bay, Île de France, and Nantucket in November 1793. She became American again in November 1793, and was in Dunkirk in 1794.

As United States she made a second voyage to the Falklands in 1786. A whaler by the name of United States arrived at Dunkirk in July 1787 from the Falklands.

Francis Rotch commissioned her in August 1787 under the name Dauphin. (Note: William Rotch Jnr. was an American Quaker who had operated whalers out of Dunkirk between 1786 and 1794. Francis Rotch (1750-1822), was a brother of William Rotch Snr. From about 1760 to 1900, the Rotch family were key figures in the development of the whaling industry in Nantucket and New Bedford.)

French records indicate that under Captain Uriah Swain, Dauphin, Francis Rotch, agent, sailed to the coast of Brazil on 18 August 1787, and returned on 4 July 1788 with 1452 barrels of whale oil and 16,000 lbs of whalebone. She returned to Dover in 1788, selling her 25,000 gallons of whale oil duty free. The 13,000 seal skins she had collected were sold in China for ten times their New York value, confirming the lucrative nature of the China Trade. After this voyage, the vessel was sold in 1788 to the French South Sea whaling partnership.

In 1791 Dauphin was under the command of Jonathan Parker.

On 22 November 1792 Dauphin sailed for Brazil and Delagoa Bay under the command of Captain Stephen Gardner. At some point he left and Captain Lallermant replaced him. She returned in November 1793 with 1900 barrels of whale oil.

In May 1794 Dauphin arrived at Charleston, South Carolina. She was sold at auction on 23 June to Jean Bouteille who wished to convert her to a privateer. Despite efforts by Benjamin Moodie, the British Vice-consul in Charleston to block her conversion, in March 1795 she was ready and sailed for Port-de-Paix. Her ultimate fate is unknown.

== See also ==
- List of sailing frigates of the United States Navy
- List of ships captured in the 18th century
- Bibliography of early American naval history
