= The King of Love My Shepherd Is =

1868 Christian hymn written by Henry Williams Baker

- Genre: Hymn
- Written: 1868
- Text: Henry Williams Baker
- Based on: Psalm 23
- Meter: 8.7.8.7
- Melody: "Dominus Regit Me" by John Bacchus Dykes

The King of Love My Shepherd Is is an 1868 hymn with lyrics written by Henry Williams Baker, based on the Welsh version of Psalm 23 made by Edmund Prys.

It is most often sung to one of four different melodies:

1. "Dominus Regit Me", composed by John Bacchus Dykes, a friend and contemporary of Henry Williams Baker. It first appeared in the 1868 appendix to Hymns Ancient and Modern. In 1997 this version was sung at the funeral of Diana, Princess of Wales.
2. The traditional Irish tune "St. Columba". The tune, first transcribed by George Petri in the mid nineteenth century, was paired with the text by Ralph Vaughan Williams in The English Hymnal (1906), in an existing harmonisation by Charles Villiers Stanford.
3. "Remsen", by Rees Thomas, which first appeared in Daniel Prothero's Welsh 1918 hymnbook Cân a Mawl, for the Calvanistic Methodists of North America.
4. "Ich dank' dir schon", composed by Michael Praetorius in 1610, as published in The Lutheran Hymnal, No. 431 (1941).

Other choral settings of the text include those by Edward Bairstow (1931), Charles Gounod (1899), Harry Rowe Shelley (1886) and Arthur Somervell (1903). There are many other settings of texts derived from Psalm 23.

Henry Baker's last words were reportedly lyrics from this hymn.

== Lyrics ==
The King of love my shepherd is,
whose goodness faileth never.
I nothing lack if I am his,
and he is mine forever.

Where streams of living water flow,
my ransomed soul he leadeth;
and where the verdant pastures grow,
with food celestial feedeth.

Perverse and foolish, oft I strayed,
but yet in love he sought me;
and on his shoulder gently laid,
and home, rejoicing, brought me.

In death's dark vale I fear no ill,
with thee, dear Lord, beside me;
thy rod and staff my comfort still,
thy cross before to guide me.

Thou spreadst a table in my sight;
thy unction grace bestoweth;
and oh, what transport of delight
from thy pure chalice floweth!

And so through all the length of days,
thy goodness faileth never;
Good Shepherd, may I sing thy praise
within thy house forever.
