= Sherston-Baker baronets =

Title in the Baronetage of Great Britain

Escutcheon of the Sherston-Baker baronets of Dunstable House

The Baker, later Sherston-Baker Baronetcy, of Dunstable House in Richmond in the County of Surrey, is a title in the Baronetage of Great Britain. It was created on 14 May 1796 for Robert Baker of the Surrey Fencible Cavalry, in recognition of his raising and maintaining a cavalry regiment of 500 men styled "The Richmond Rangers". He had married in 1783 Dinah Hayley, daughter of George Hayley.

He was succeeded by his son, the 2nd Baronet, a vice-admiral in the Royal Navy. The 4th Baronet was Recorder of Helston and of Barnstaple and Bideford and a County Court judge. The 5th Baronet assumed by deed poll the additional surname of Sherston in 1923.

== Baker, later Sherston-Baker baronets, of Dunstable House (1796) ==
- Sir Robert Baker, 1st Baronet (1754–1826)
- Sir Henry Loraine Baker, 2nd Baronet (1787–1859)
- Sir Henry Williams Baker, 3rd Baronet (1821–1877), a cleric and hymnwriter, promoter of Hymns Ancient and Modern.
- Sir George Edward Dunstan Sherston Baker, 4th Baronet (1846–1923)
- Sir Dodington George Richard Sherston-Baker, 5th Baronet (1877–1944)
- Sir Humphrey Dodington Benedict Sherston-Baker, 6th Baronet (1907–1990)
- Sir Robert George Humphrey Sherston-Baker, 7th Baronet (born 1951)

The heir apparent is the current holder's son David George Arbuthnot Sherston-Baker (born 1992).

== Notes ==
Baronetage of Great Britain
Preceded by Turton baronets	Baker baronets of Starborough Castle; 14 May 1796	Succeeded by Hayes baronets
