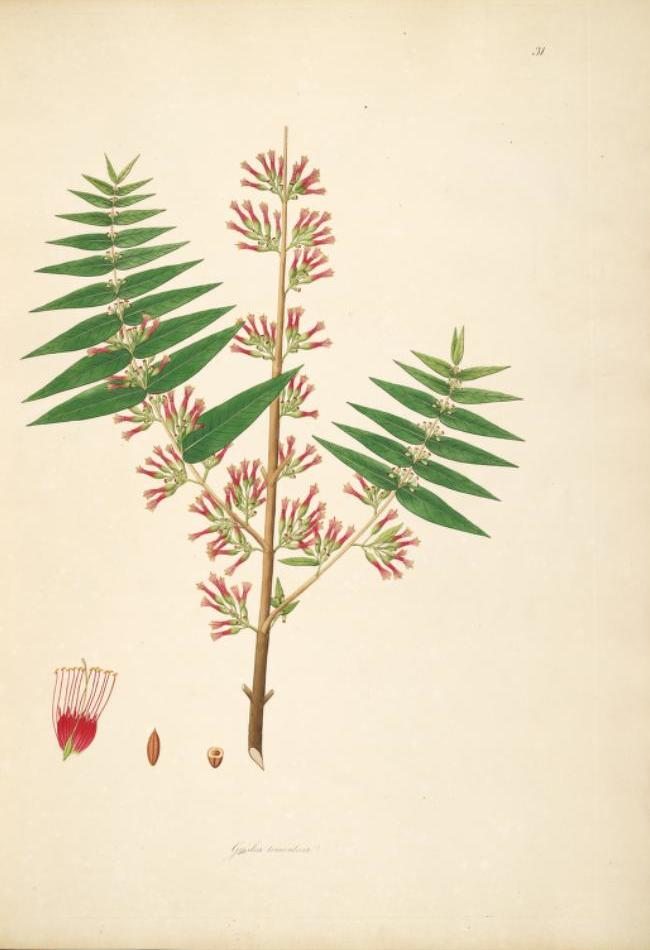
- Woodfordia fruticosa, illustration

Conservation status
- Least Concern (IUCN 2.3)

Scientific classification
- Kingdom: Plantae
- Clade: Tracheophytes
- Clade: Angiosperms
- Clade: Eudicots
- Clade: Rosids
- Order: Myrtales
- Family: Lythraceae
- Genus: Woodfordia
- Species: W. fruticosa

Binomial name
- Woodfordia fruticosa (L.) Kurz

Synonyms
- Acistoma coccineum Zipp. ex Span. Grislea micropetala Hochst. & Steud. Grislea punctata Buch. Ham. ex Sm. Grislea tomentosa Roxb. Lythrum fruticosum L. Lythrum hunteri DC. Lythrum punctatum Span. Woodfordia floribunda Salisb. Woodfordia tomentosa (Roxb.) Bedd.

= Woodfordia fruticosa =

Species of flowering plant

Woodfordia fruticosa is a species of plant in the family Lythraceae. It is known to the Gujarati people as dhavdi.

== Distribution ==
Woodfordia fruticosa is found in: Tanzania, Madagascar, Comores, Saudi Arabia, Oman, Myanmar, Bhutan, Indonesia, China (Guangdong, Guangxi, Yunnan), India, Sri Lanka, Nepal, Pakistan and Vietnam.
