= Sir Henry Baker, 2nd Baronet =

British Royal Navy admiral (1787–1859)

Vice-Admiral Sir Henry Baker Bt CB
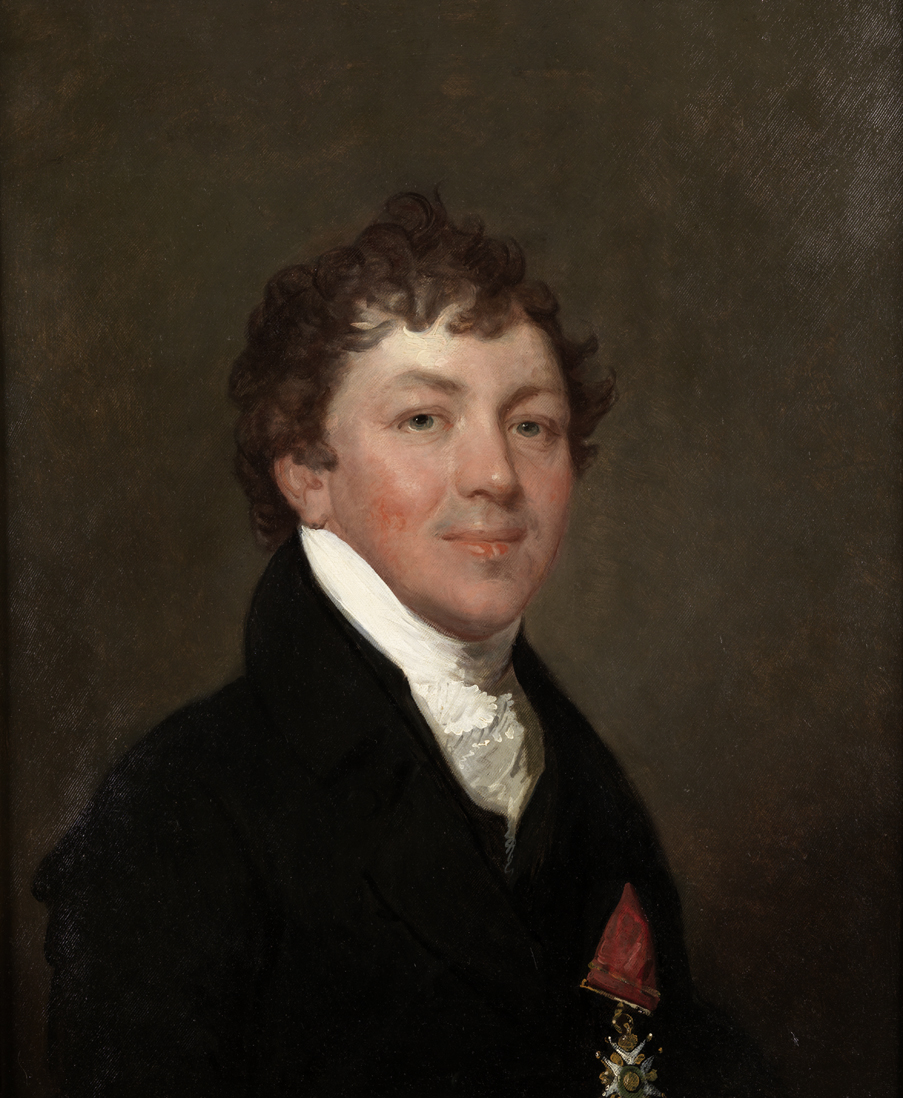
- Born: 3 January 1787; Nancy, France
- Died: 2 November 1859 (aged 72)
- Military career
- Allegiance: United Kingdom
- Branch: Royal Navy
- Service years: 1797–1846
- Rank: Vice-Admiral
- Commands: Anholt; HMS Conflict; HMS Fairy; HMS Howe; HMS Camperdown
- Conflicts: French Revolutionary Wars; Napoleonic Wars; Blockade of Saint-Domingue; Walcheren Campaign; Battle of Anholt; Battle of Guadeloupe (1815); War of 1812; Raid on Alexandria

Vice-Admiral Sir Henry Loraine Baker, 2nd Baronet, CB (3 January 1787 – 2 November 1859) was an officer of the British Royal Navy who served during the French Revolutionary and Napoleonic Wars against France and her allies, and also in the War of 1812 against the United States.

== Biography ==
Baker was born in Nancy, France, the eldest surviving son of Sir Robert Baker, Bt., and Dinah Hayley, the daughter of Mary (née Wilkes) and George Hayley, Alderman and MP for the City of London. Baker entered the Royal Navy in December 1797 as a first class volunteer aboard the frigate Unite under the command of Captain Charles Rowley. He then served aboard the brig-sloop Cruizer under Captains Charles Wollaston and James Brisbane, before returning to Captain Rowley to serve as a midshipman in Boadicea, all in home waters, until the peace of 1802.

In July 1802 he joined Centaur under Captain Bendall Robert Littlehales, and after taking part in the capture of Saint Lucia under Admiral Sir Samuel Hood, he and Littlehales returned home aboard the hired brig Morne Fortunee with despatches in June 1803. He was then attached to Northumberland, Captain the Honourable Alexander Cochrane, but soon returned to the West Indies to serve aboard Theseus under Captain John Bligh in operations at Saint-Domingue. Baker took part in the blockade of Cape François; the capture of Fort Dauphin, where two forts and a 28-gun corvette La Sagesse, were taken; and the surrender of the French squadron with the remains of General Rochambeau's army on board.

On 16 July 1804 Baker followed Captain Bligh into the frigate Surveillante with the rank of acting-lieutenant. In March 1805 he was transferred 18-gun Reynard under the command of Captain Jeremiah Coghlan. On 20 March the Reynard destroyed a large French privateer General Ernouf, as a result of which Baker's commission was confirmed and backdated to 18 October 1804. In December 1805 he joined the Fortunée under Captain Henry Vansittart, then from May 1806 served aboard Mediator under Captain William Furlong Wise as first lieutenant. He took part in the capture of several privateers, and the storming of the fort at Samaná on 14 February 1807. He then served aboard Veteran, the flagship of Rear-Admiral James Richard Dacres.

Baker returned home in late 1807 and joined the Castor under Captain William Roberts, then Eagle under Captain Rowley again, and Leda under George Sayer. In August 1809, he took charge of a gun-boat, and was particularly mentioned by Sir George Cockburn for his part at the bombardment of Vlissingen during the Walcheren Campaign. On 15 August 1810, he assumed command of a 10-gun schooner named Anholt, and served as second in command under Captain James Wilkes Maurice at the defence of Anholt, in March 1811 when that island was attacked by a Danish force at least four times larger than the British garrison. Baker in Anholt played a major part in the defeat of the enemy by bearing down along the northern shore of the island, and placing them between two fires. This was acknowledged, on his arrival in England with despatches, by promotion to the rank of commander dated 8 April 1811.

On 28 October 1812 Baker was appointed to command of the brig Conflict, and on 18 March 1814 to the brig-sloop Fairy, both on the North America Station. In August 1814 he took part in operations on the Potomac River; at the capture of Fort Washington, and the capitulation of Alexandria. In the despatches of Captain James Alexander Gordon, he was praised for his conduct, particularly for his part in preventing the grounded Devastation from falling into the hands of the enemy. Following the surrender of Guadeloupe in August 1815, in which he also took part, he was received promotion to post-captain, backdated to 13 June 1815, and about the same time made a Companion of the Bath.

On 27 June 1820 he married Louisa Ann Williams, the daughter of William Williams of Belmont House, South Lambeth, formerly MP for Weymouth, and had two sons and five daughters. He succeeded his father as second baronet on 4 February 1826.

On 29 July 1840, Baker was selected by Vice-Admiral Sir Henry Digby, Commander-in-Chief, The Nore, to be his flag captain in the Howe at Sheerness. In October 1841, a few days after transferring with Digby to Camperdown, while in attendance on the Lords of the Admiralty, he broke his leg and received other severe injuries. He resigned the command of Camperdown in December, and on 19 January 1842 was granted a pension of £180. He was promoted to rear-admiral on 6 November 1850, and to vice-admiral on 9 July 1857. Vice-Admiral Baker died on 2 November 1859.

== See also ==
- Sherston-Baker baronets

Baronetage of the United Kingdom
| Preceded by Sir Robert Baker | Baronet (of Dunstable House); 1826–1859 | Succeeded by Sir Henry Williams Baker |
