= Turton baronets of Starborough Castle (1796) =

Turton baronets
- Arms of the Turton baronets of Starborough Castle
- Creation date: 1796
- Status: extinct
- Extinction date: 1854
- Seat: Starborough Castle
- Arms: or, ten trefoils, slipped, vert, four, three, two, and one; a canton gules
- Crest: out of a mural coronet argent a cubit arm, erect, vested vert, cuff of the first, holding in the hand proper a banner, per pale, argent and of the second, fringed gold (sic), staff also of the first, headed or

The Turton Baronetcy, of Starborough Castle in the County of Surrey, was created in the Baronetage of Great Britain on 13 May 1796 for the barrister Thomas Turton. He was High Sheriff of Surrey for 1795–6, and came to notice during the 1796 riots in the county. He was Member of Parliament for Southwark from 1806 to 1812.

The title became extinct on the death of the 2nd Baronet in 1854.

== Turton baronets, of Starborough Castle (1796) ==
- Sir Thomas Turton, 1st Baronet (1764–1844)
- Sir Thomas Edward Michell Turton, 2nd Baronet (1790–1854). He was legal advisor to Lord Durham, for his journey to British North America 1838. The appointment was questioned in parliament, on the grounds that Turton was not of good character. He became a personal secretary to Durham.

== Notes ==
Baronetage of Great Britain
Preceded by Cradock-Hartopp baronets	Turton baronets of Starborough Castle; 13 May 1796	Succeeded by Baker baronets
