= George Sherston Baker =

British barrister and legal author (1846–1923)

Baker in 1898.

Sir George Edward Dunstan Sherston Baker, 4th Baronet (19 May 1846 – 15 March 1923) was a British barrister and judge. He was a County Court judge from 1901 until his death. He was also a prolific writer on legal topics.

== Selected bibliography ==
- Hallock’s International Law, 2nd edn 1878, 3rd 1893, 4th 1908
- The Laws relating to Quarantine, 1879
- The Office of Vice-Admiral of the Coast, 1884
- Law Reports, Digest of Cases, 1881–1885
- (editor) Law Magazine and Review, 1895–1898
- Archbold’s Quarter Sessions, 5th edn 1898
- First Steps in International Law, 1899

== See also ==
- Sherston-Baker baronets
