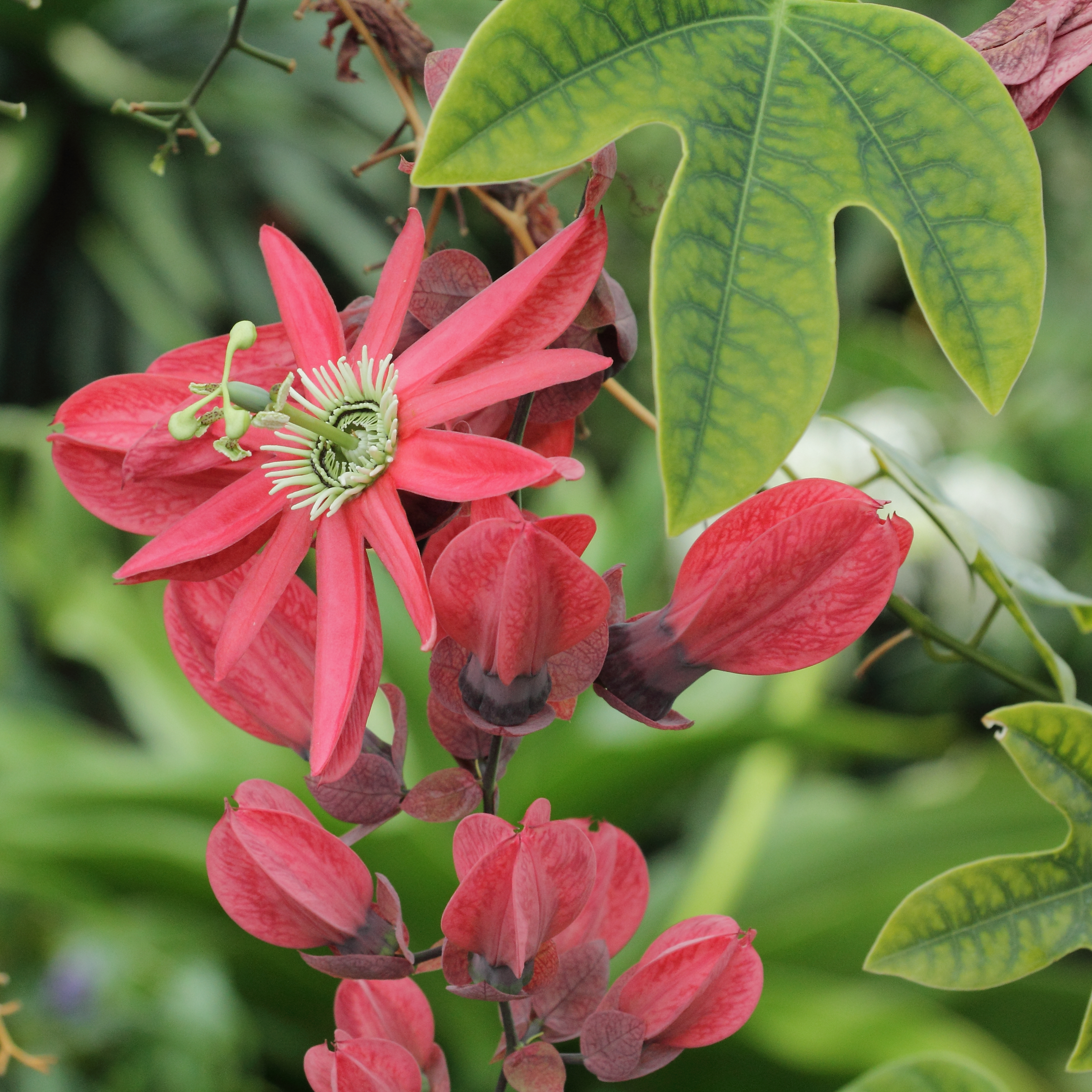

Scientific classification
- Kingdom: Plantae
- Clade: Tracheophytes
- Clade: Angiosperms
- Clade: Eudicots
- Clade: Rosids
- Order: Malpighiales
- Family: Passifloraceae
- Genus: Passiflora
- Species: P. racemosa

Binomial name
- Passiflora racemosa Brot.

= Passiflora racemosa =

Species of vine

Passiflora racemosa, the red passion flower, is a species of flowering plant in the family Passifloraceae, native to Brazil. It is an evergreen climber growing to 5 m (16 ft), with simple or 3-lobed leaves to 10 cm (4 in) long, and vivid red flowers borne in summer. The flowers are 12 cm (5 in) in diameter, with purple and white coronas. They are followed by oblong green fruits.

The specific epithet racemosa indicates that the flowers are borne in racemes.

With a minimum temperature requirement of 13 °C (55 °F), in temperate regions this plant must be grown under glass. It has gained the Royal Horticultural Society's Award of Garden Merit.
