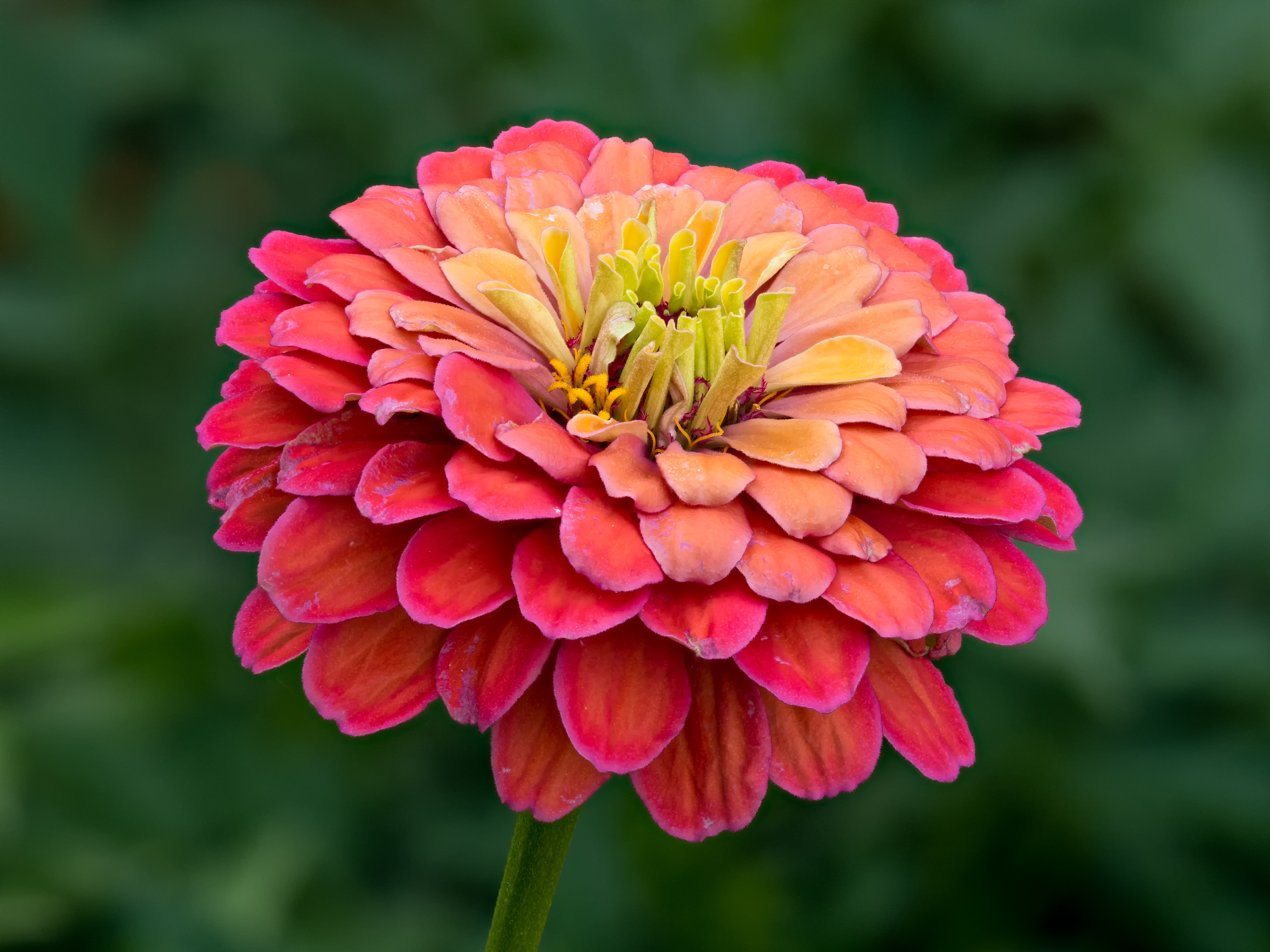

Scientific classification
- Kingdom: Plantae
- Clade: Embryophytes
- Clade: Tracheophytes
- Clade: Angiosperms
- Clade: Eudicots
- Clade: Asterids
- Order: Asterales
- Family: Asteraceae
- Tribe: Heliantheae
- Genus: Zinnia
- Species: Z. elegans

Binomial name
- Zinnia elegans Jacq. 1793, conserved name not Jacq. 1797 nor Sessé & Moc. 1890

Synonyms
- Zinnia violacea Cav.; Crassina elegans (Jacq.) Kuntze; Zinnia australis F.M.Bailey

= Zinnia elegans =

Species of flowering plant

Zinnia elegans (syn. Zinnia violacea) known as youth-and-age, common zinnia or elegant zinnia, is an annual flowering plant in the family Asteraceae. It is native to Mexico but grown as an ornamental in many places and naturalised in several places, including scattered locations in South and Central America, the West Indies, the United States, Australia, and Italy.

== Description ==
The uncultivated plant grows to about 15 cm (5.27 in) in height. It has solitary flower heads about 5 cm (2 in) across. The purple ray florets surround black and yellow discs. The lanceolate leaves are opposite the flower heads. Flowering occurs during the summer months.

== History ==
The species was first collected in 1789 at Tixtla, Guerrero, by Sessé and Mociño. It was formally described as Zinnia violacea by Cavanilles in 1791. Jacquin described it again in 1792 as Zinnia elegans, which was the name that Sessé and Moçiño had used in their manuscript of Plantae Novae Hispaniae, which was not published until 1890. The genus was named by Carl von Linné after the German botanist Johann Gottfried Zinn, who described the species now known as Zinnia peruviana in 1757 as Rudbeckia foliis oppositis hirsutis ovato-acutis, calyce imbricatus, radii petalis pistillatis. Linné realised that it was not a Rudbeckia.

== Cultivation ==
The garden zinnia was bred via hybridisation from the wild form. Zinnias are popular garden plants with hundreds of cultivars in many flower colours, sizes and forms. There are giant forms with flower heads up to 15 cm (6 in) in diameter.

Flower colours range from white and cream to pinks, reds, and purples, to green, yellow, apricot, orange, salmon, and bronze. Some are striped, speckled or bicoloured. There are "pom-pom" forms that resemble dahlias. Sizes range from dwarf varieties of less than 15 cm (6 in) in height to 90 cm (3 ft) tall. The powdery mildew common to zinnias in humid climates is less common in recently developed varieties, which are resistant.

The following have won the Royal Horticultural Society's Award of Garden Merit:

- 'Benary's Giant Salmon Rose'
- 'Benary's Giant Scarlet'
- 'Dreamland Mixed'
- 'Dreamland Rose'
- 'Dreamland Scarlet'
- 'Dreamland Yellow'
- 'Purple Prince'
- 'Short Stuff Orange'
- 'Zinderella Peach'
- 'Zowie! Yellow Flame'

Other cultivars include 'Magellan', 'Envy Double', 'Fireworks', 'Blue Point Purple', 'Profusion Cherry', 'Profusion Orange', 'Star Gold', 'Star Orange', and several white-flowered types such as 'Crystal White', 'Purity', and 'Profusion White'. Mixed-colour seed selections are available.

=== Growth ===
Zinnias grow easily and prefer well-drained, loamy soil and full sun. They grow best in dry, warm, frost-free regions, and many kinds are drought-tolerant. As they do not tolerate freezing temperatures, in temperate zones they must be sown after all danger of frost has passed. Alternatively, they may be sown under cover and carefully transplanted into their final positions when the soil warms up.

== Gallery ==
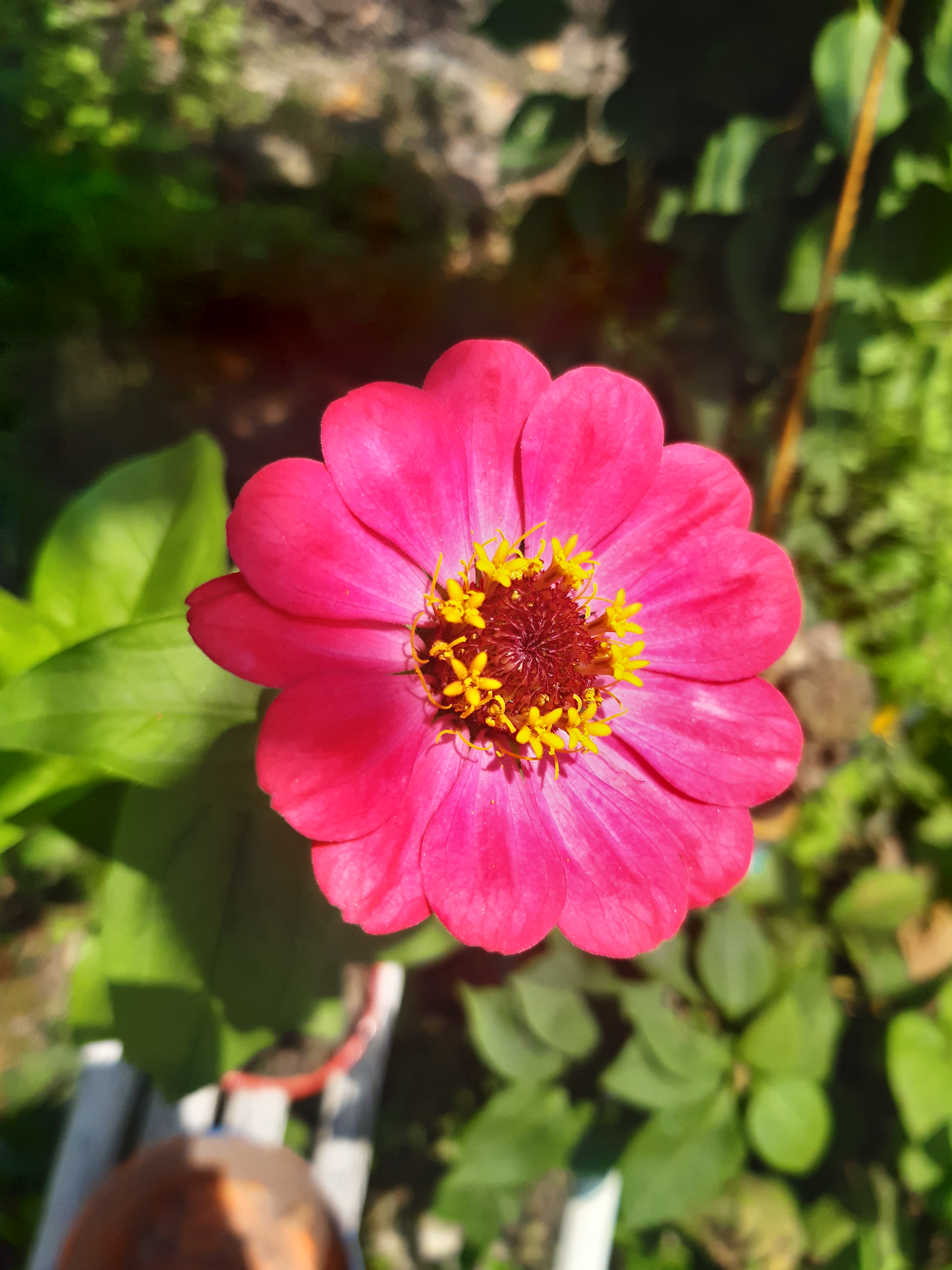

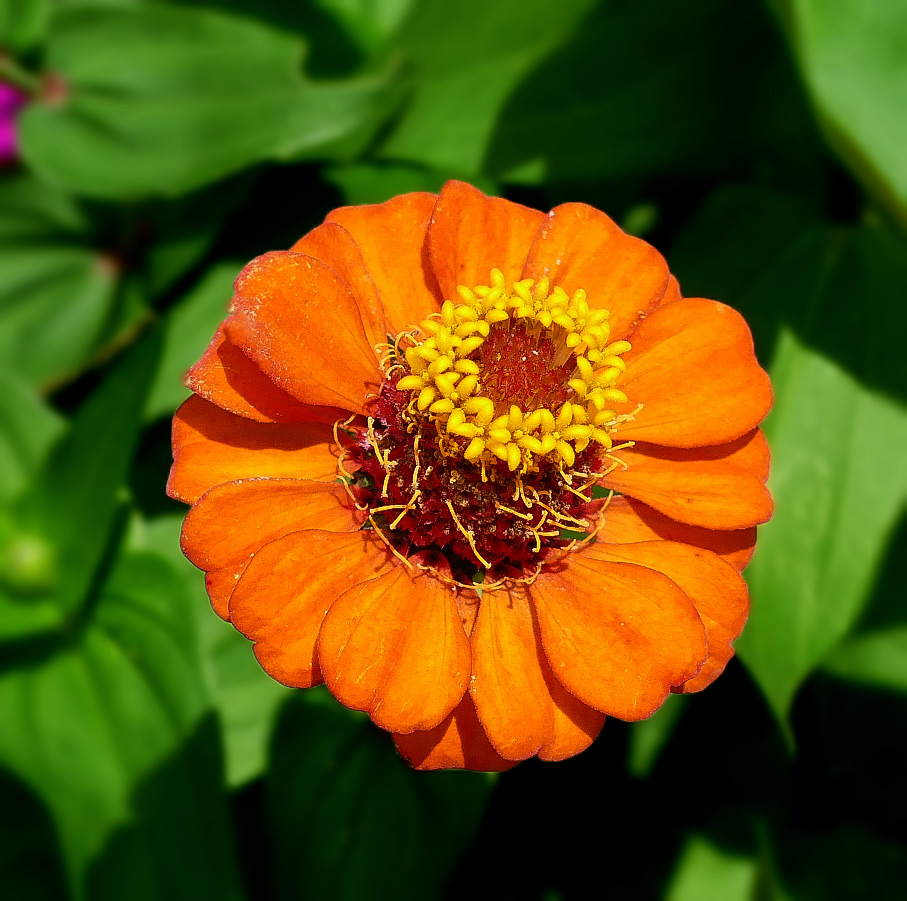

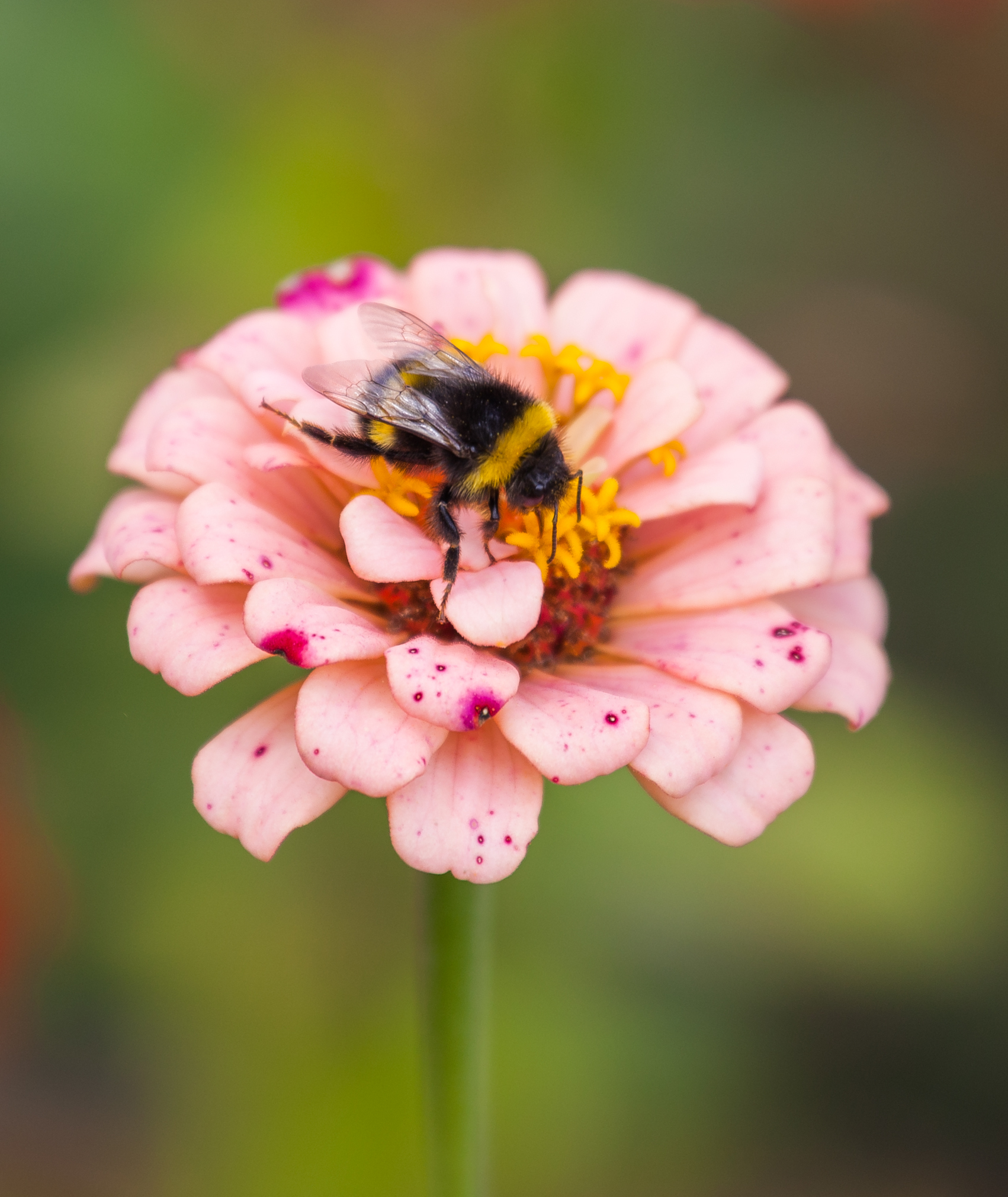

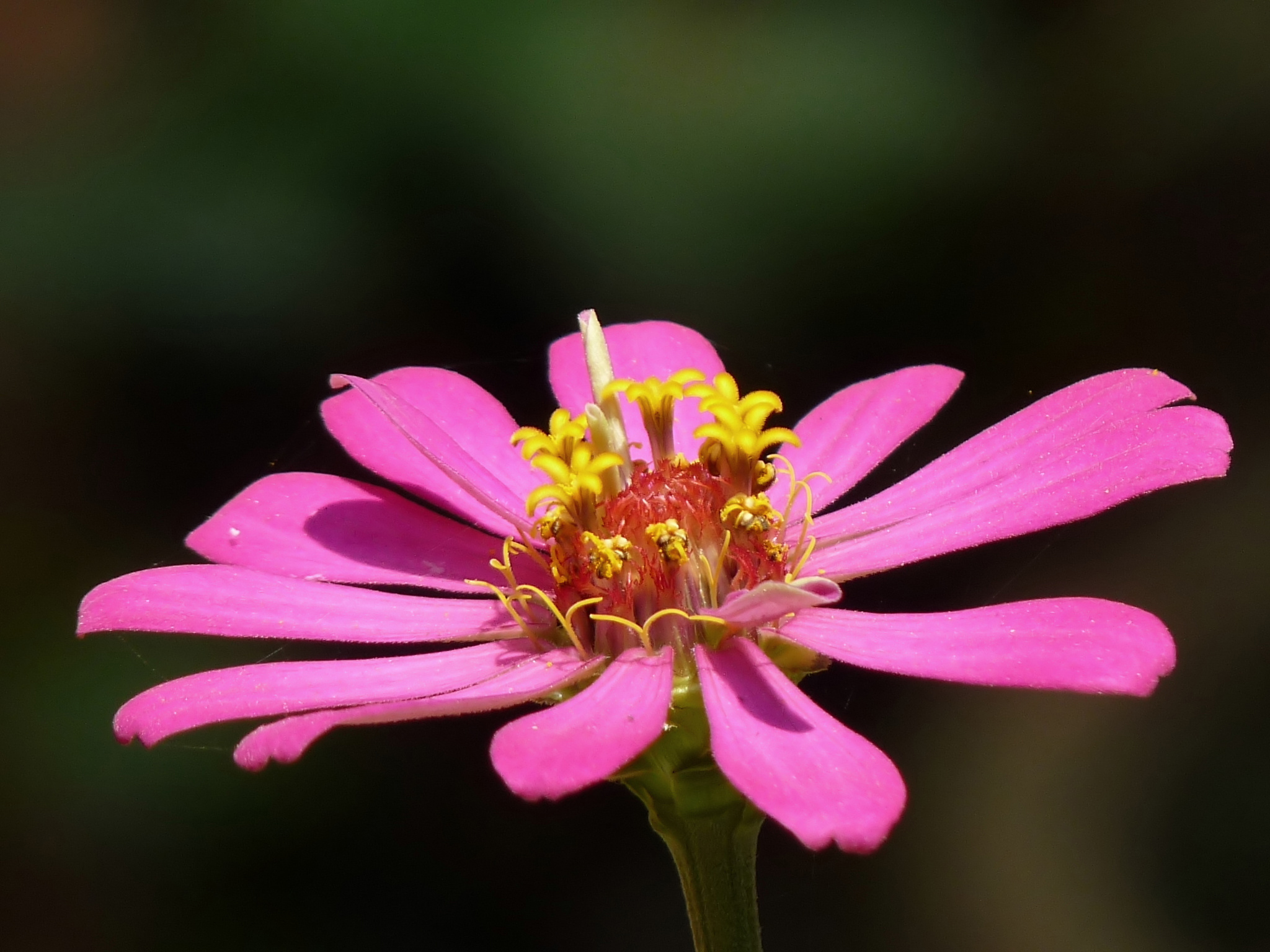

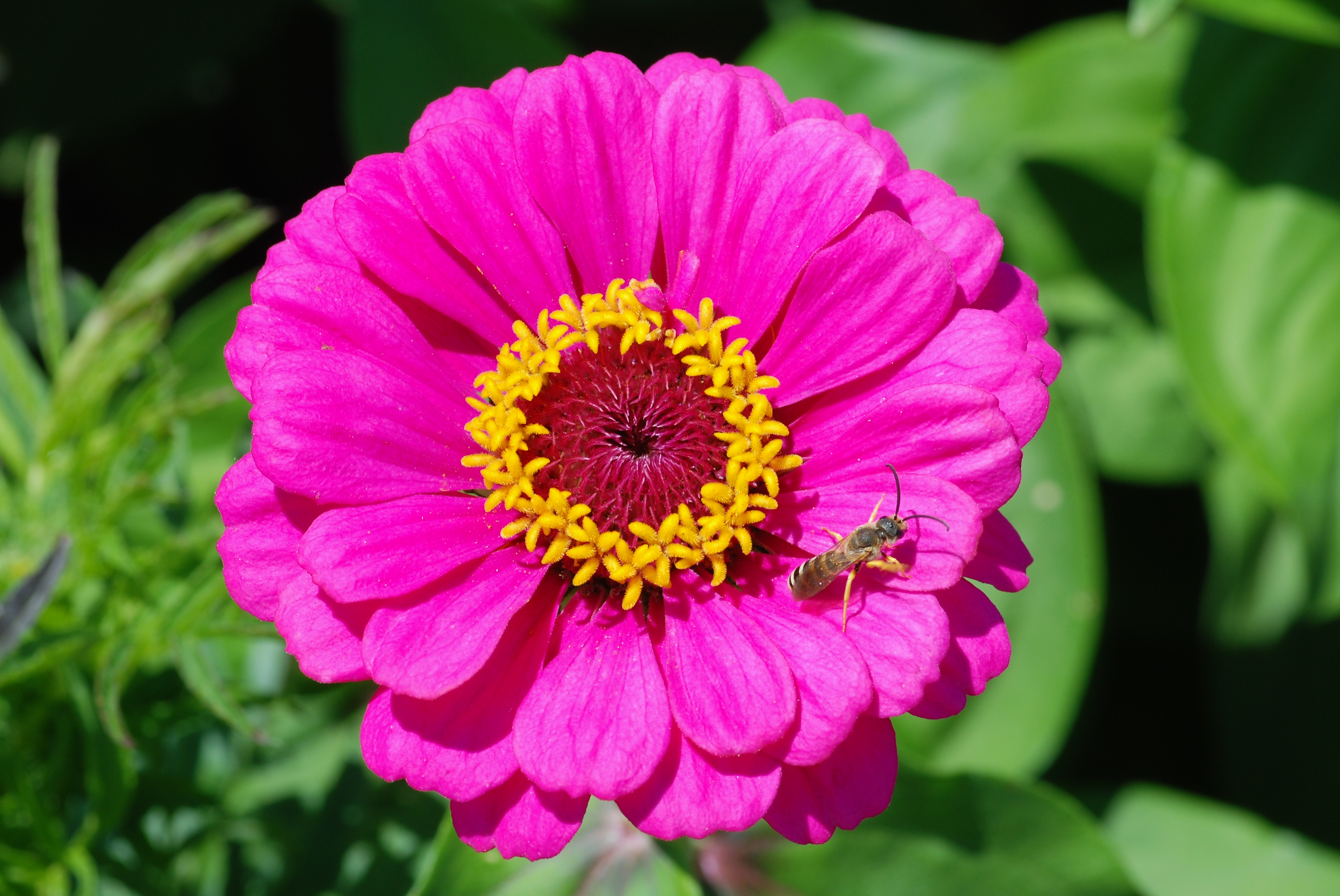

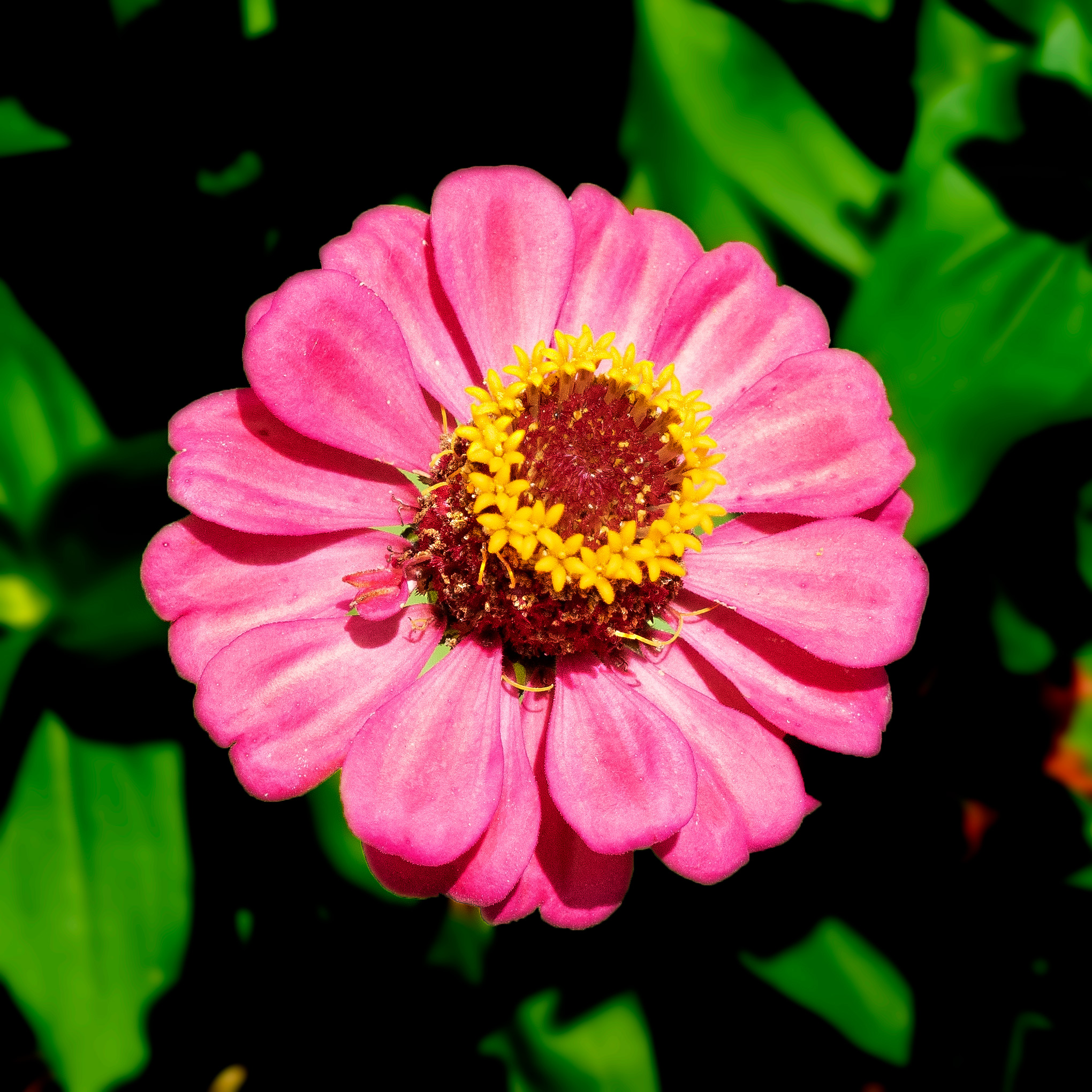

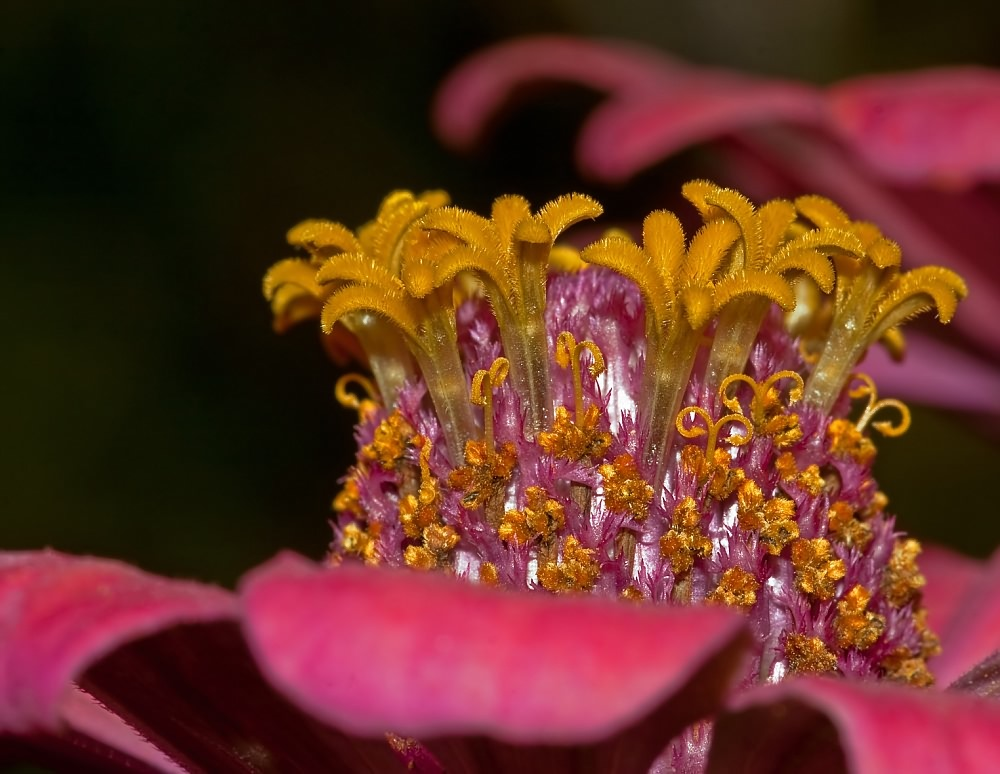

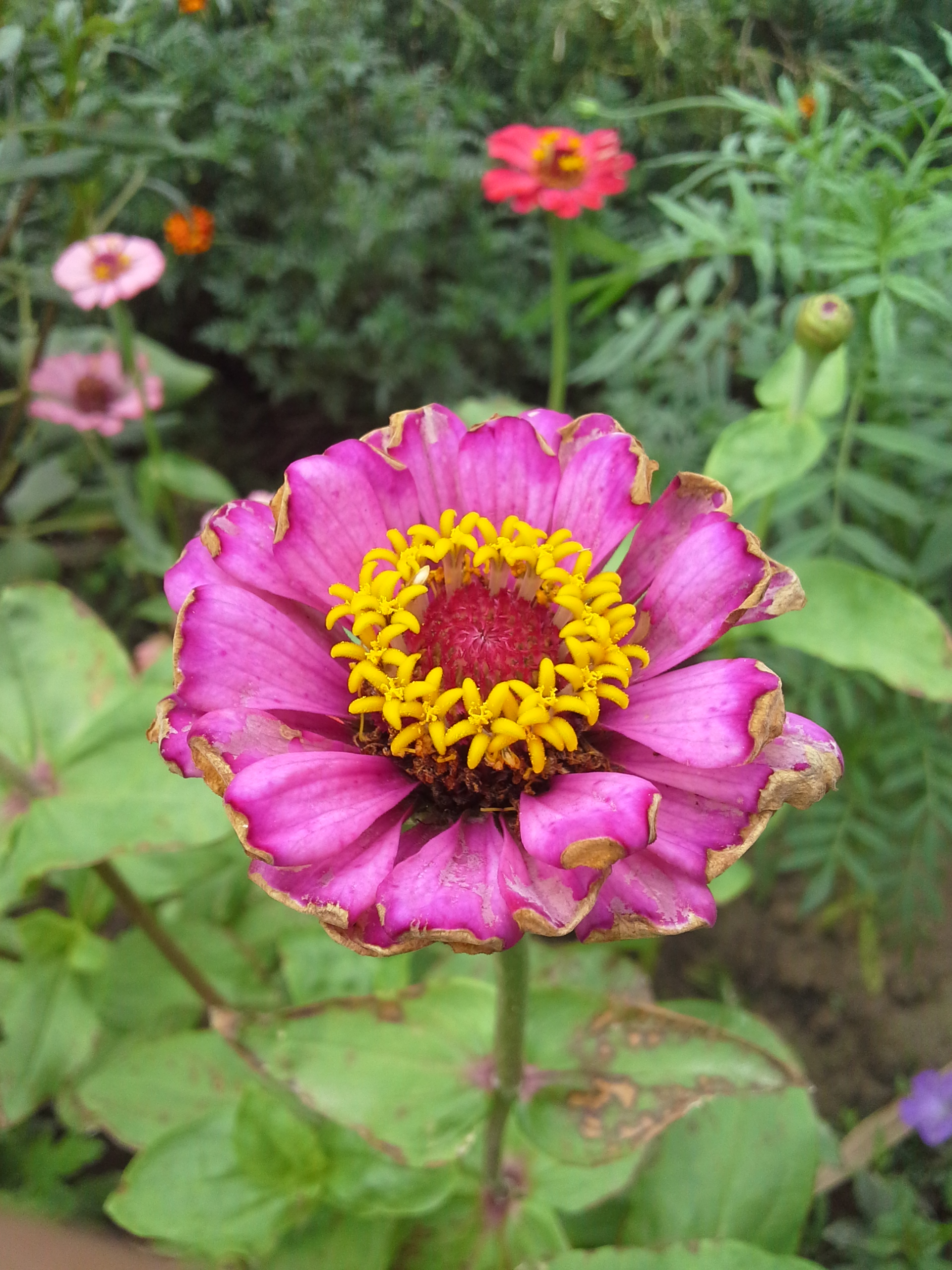

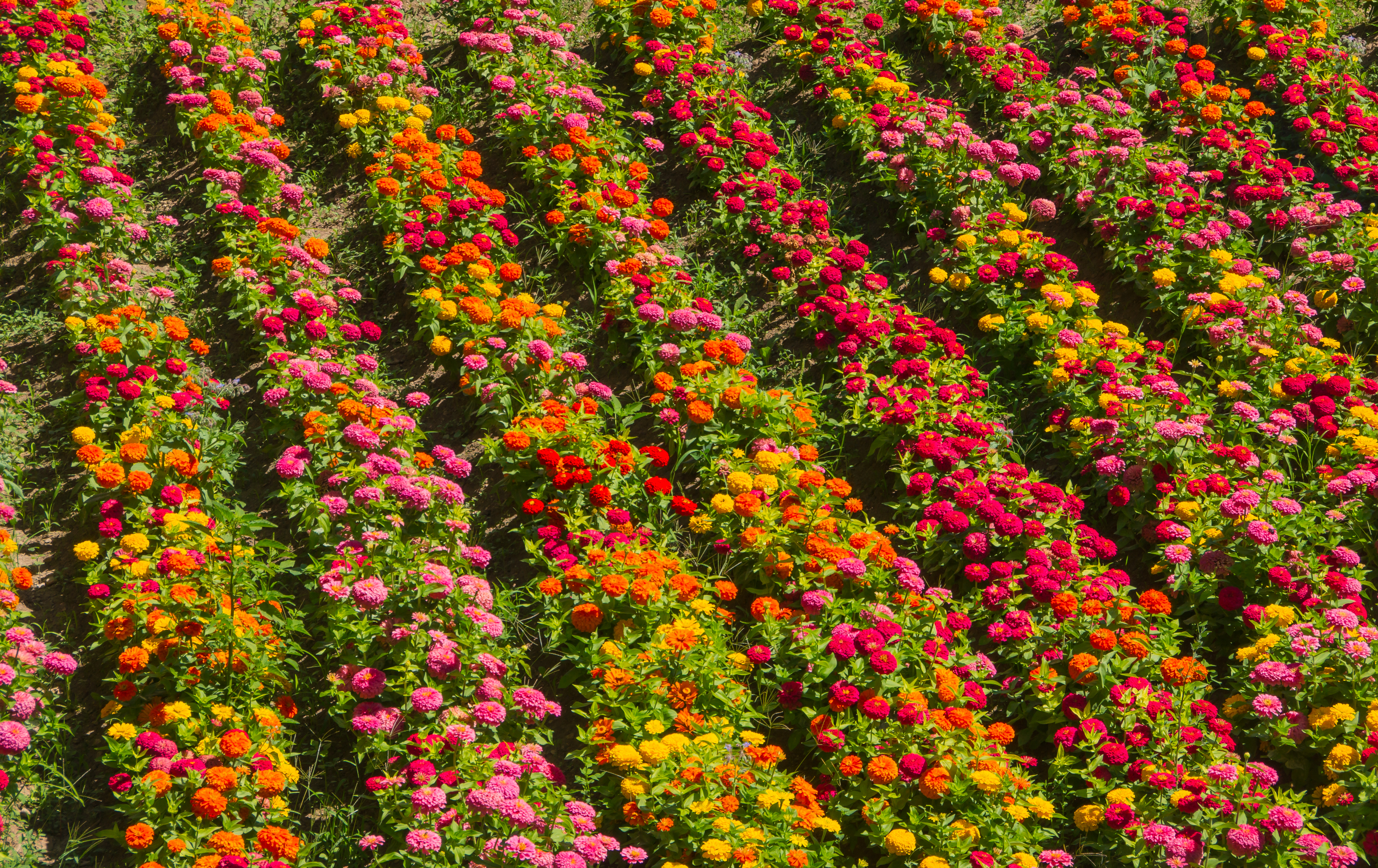

== General sources ==
- Floridata: Zinnia elegans
- Plant of the week: Zinnia elegans
- Garden Guides: Zinnia elegans
- Wildflower Information: Zinnia elegans
- North Carolina State University: Zinnia elegans
- Flowers of India: Zinnia elegans
- Kew Plant List
- The International Plant Names Index
