= Richard Oliver (radical) =

British merchant, plantation owner and politician

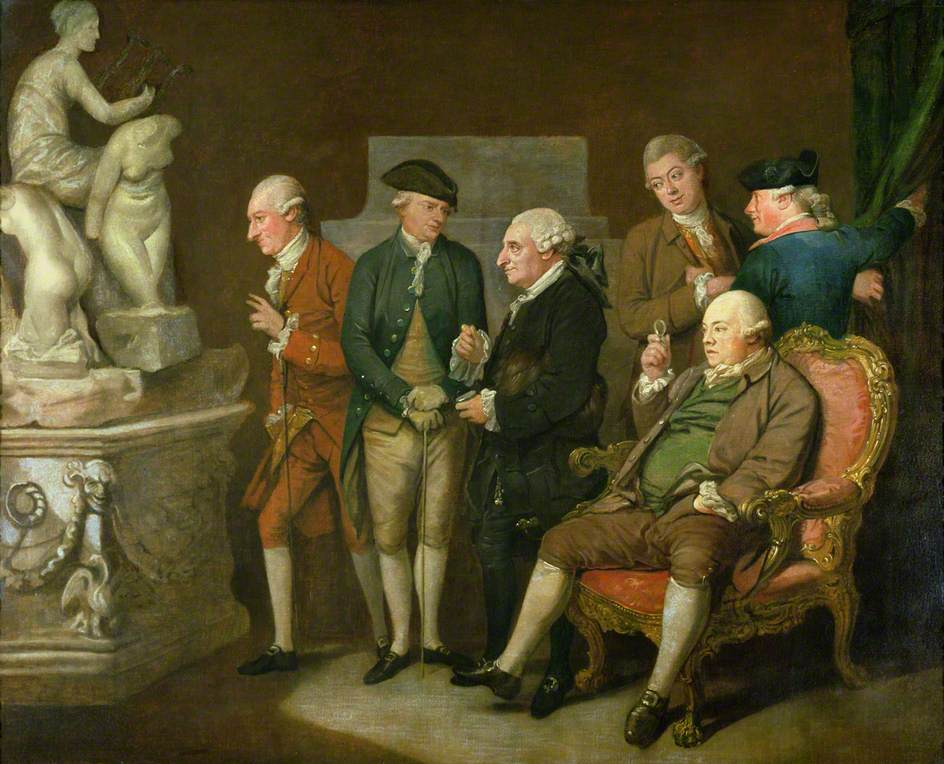
- Born: 1735
- Died: 1784
- Occupations: Politician, plantation owner, merchant

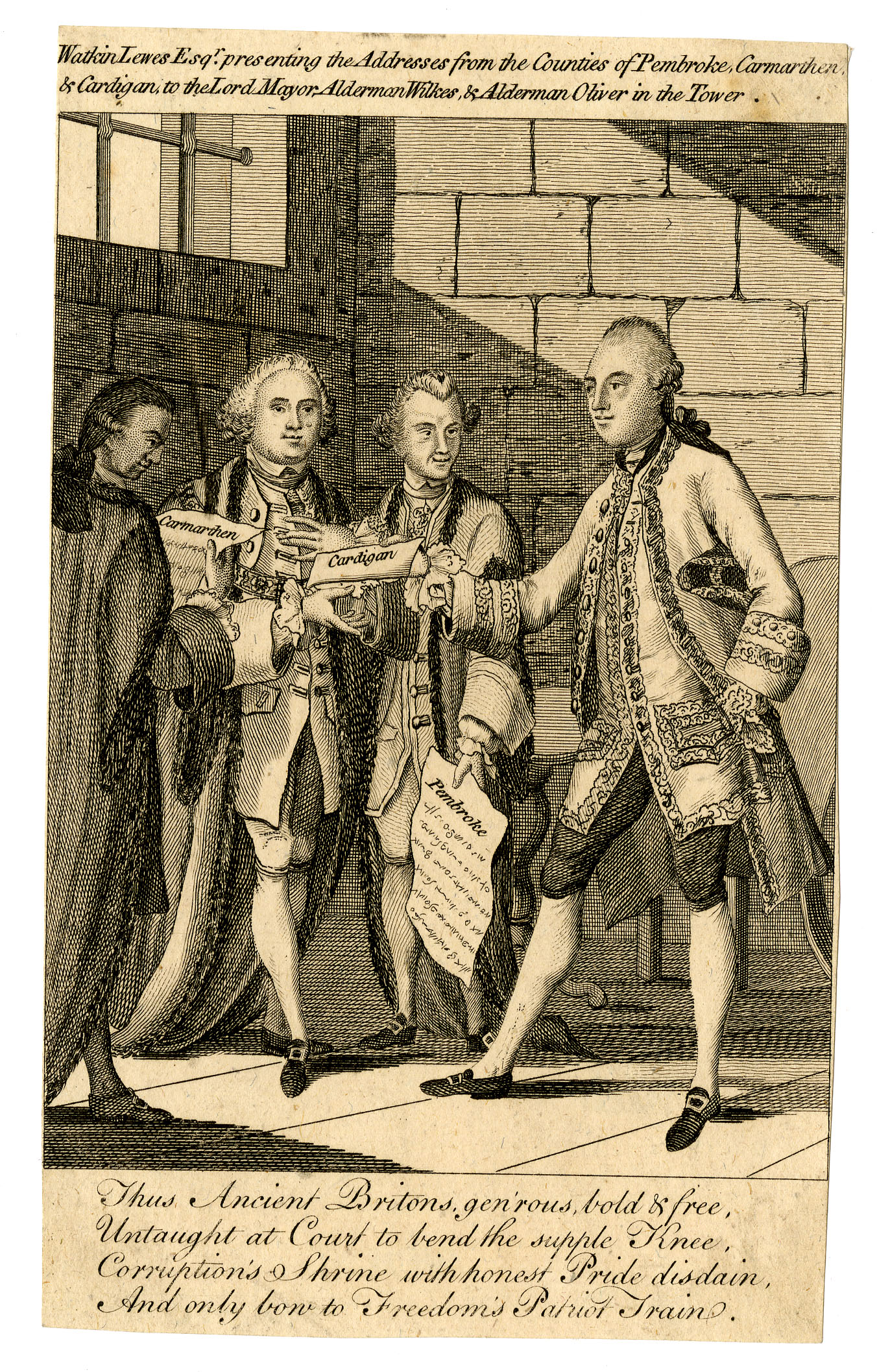
Satirical print: "Watkin Lewes Esqr presenting the addresses from the counties of Pembroke, Carmarthen, and Cardigan, to the Lord Mayor, Alderman Wilkes, and Alderman Oliver in the Tower" (1771)

Richard Oliver (1735–1784) was a British merchant, plantation owner and politician who sat in the House of Commons from 1770 to 1780.

== Early life ==
Oliver was the only surviving son of Rowland Oliver, a puisne judge of the court of common pleas of the Leeward Islands, and grandson of Richard Oliver, speaker of the house of Assembly in Antigua, was baptised in St. John's, Antigua, on 7 January 1734–6. At an early age he was sent to London, where he entered the office of his uncle, Richard Oliver, a West India merchant of Low Leyton, Essex. He married Richard Oliver's daughter, his cousin Mary Oliver on 2 February 1758. He retired from business after succeeding to his father's estates in Antigua on 16 July 1767.

== Political career ==
Oliver entered City politics with his brother-in-law Thomas Oliver. He was one of the trustees of the fund raised in 1768 to pay the debts of John Wilkes, a founder member of the Bill of Rights Society, and later its treasurer. In March 1770 he was on the deputation which presented the London remonstrance to the King. He took up his freedom in the Drapers' Company on 29 June 1770, and on 4 July following was elected alderman of Billingsgate ward. Thomas Oliver was chosen as Radical candidate for London at the by-election following William Beckford's death, but had to withdraw because of illness, and Richard Oliver replaced him.

Oliver was returned as Member of Parliament for City of London on 11 July 1770. On 6 December 1770 he seconded Serjeant Glynn's motion for a committee to inquire into the administration of criminal justice (Parl. Hist. xvi. 1215-7). In March 1771 he became engaged in the struggle between the City of London and the House of Commons led by Brass Crosby and was committed to the Tower of London by order of the speaker on the 20th of that month (ib. xvii. 155). On 6 April he was brought up on a writ of habeas corpus before Lord Mansfield, who declined to interfere, as parliament was still sitting. A similar application was made on his behalf to the court of exchequer on 30 April, with the same want of success. The parliamentary session, however, closed on 8 May, when Oliver and Crosby were released from the Tower, and conducted in a triumphal procession to the Mansion House. Though formerly an active supporter of Wilkes, Oliver refused to serve as sheriff with him in 1771 (Gent. Mag. 1771, p. 189), and was elected to that office with Watkin Lewes on 1 July 1772. The friends of Wilkes were so enraged at the election of James Townsend, MP as Lord Mayor in this year that they appear to have accused Oliver "of having taken the vote of the court before their party had arrived" (Fitzmaurice, Life of William, Earl of Sherburne, 18751876, ii. 289). On 26 January 1773 Oliver spoke in favour of Sawbridge's motion for leave to bring in a bill for shortening the duration of parliaments (Parl. Hist. xvii. 692-5). He was returned again for the City of London in the 1774 general election. On 1 February 1775 he seconded a similar motion (ib. xviii. 216). On 27 November 1775 his proposed address to the king respecting 'the original authors and advisers' of the measures against the American colonies was defeated by 163 votes to 10 (ib. xviii. 1005–7, 1021). His name appears for the last time in the 'Parliamentary History' on 10 May 1776, when he seconded Sawbridge's resolution that the American colonies should 'be continued upon the same footing of giving and granting their money^ as his Majesty's subjects in Ireland are, by their own representatives' (ib. xviii. 1353). In September 1778 Oliver sent a letter to the livery of London declining being a candidate for Lord Mayor of London and on 25 November 1778 resigned as an alderman. Shortly afterwards he sailed to Antigua in order to look after his West Indian estates. He continued to represent the City of London until the dissolution of parliament in September 1780.

== Later life and legacy ==
Oliver remained in Antigua until 1784 when he returned to England by the Sandwich packet. He died on board during the journey on 16 April 1784. He had been elected a general of the Honourable Artillery Company in August 1773. The silver-gilt cup which was presented to him by the livery in March 1772 ' for joining with other magistrates in the release of a freeman, who was arrested by order of the House of Commons, and in a warrant for imprisoning the messenger who had arrested the citizen and refused to give hail,' is preserved among the corporation plate at the Mansion House. His portrait, which was painted in the Tower by R. Pine in 1772, has been engraved.

Parliament of Great Britain
Preceded by Barlow Trecothick; Thomas Harley; William Beckford; Sir Robert Ladbroke	Member of Parliament for the City of London; 1774 – Sep. 1780; With: Sir Robert Ladbroke1770-1773; Thomas Harley 1770-1774; Barlow Trecothick1770-1774; Frederick Bull 1773-1780; John Sawbridge 1774-1780; George Hayley 1774-1780	Succeeded by John Kirkman; Nathaniel Newnham; George Hayley; Frederick Bull
