= John Sawbridge =

English politician (1732-1795)

John Sawbridge (1732 – 21 February 1795) was an English politician who sat in the House of Commons from 1768 to 1780.

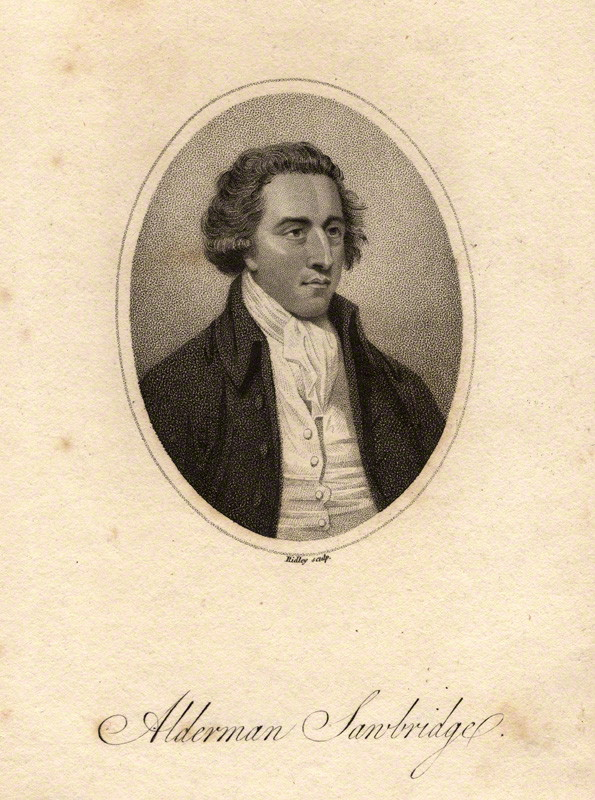
John Sawbridge, 1798 engraving.

== Life ==
Sawbridge was the eldest son of John Sawbridge, FRS of Olantigh and his wife Elizabeth Wanley, daughter of George Wanley. He was educated at The King's School, Canterbury (left 1748).

Sawbridge was elected as a Member of Parliament (MP) for Hythe at the 1768 general election, and held the seat until 1774. He exerted himself in the House of Commons on behalf of John Wilkes, who had been declared incapable of sitting for Middlesex. With John Horne Tooke, James Townsend, Richard Oliver, and others, he helped to form the Supporters of the Bill of Rights. In local politics Sawbridge, who was a liveryman of the Framework Knitters' Company, was elected, with Townsend, as sheriff of London in summer 1768, and in the following year (1 July) he was elected alderman for the ward of Langbourn. During his shrievalty he five times returned Wilkes as duly elected for Middlesex, in defiance of the house, and was threatened with a bill of pains and penalties from the government. In August 1771 Junius, in secret correspondence with Wilkes, urged him to procure Sawbridge's election as lord mayor; but Brass Crosby was reported to want re-election, and Wilkes, who had by the quarrelled with Sawbridge, refused to desert Crosby. At the election the show of hands was declared in favour of Sawbridge and Crosby, but a poll was demanded for four other candidates, Bankes, Nash, Hallifax, and Townsend. In spite of Junius's appeals, the livery returned Nash and Sawbridge to the court of aldermen. The former, the ministerial candidate, was elected Lord Mayor.

At the 1774 general election Sawbridge contested two seats: he was defeated in Hythe, but was elected as one of the 4 MPs for the City of London. He was defeated in London at the general election in September 1780, but one of his successors, John Kirkman, who died on the day when the polls closed and had been returned posthumously. Sawbridge was returned without a contest at the resulting by-election in November 1780, and was re-elected in 1784 and 1790, holding the seat until his death on 21 February 1795, aged 62. However, he was less active in the parliament of 1790 and was paralysed in the last three years of his life

He was a Sheriff of London in 1770 and elected Lord Mayor of London in 1775 in succession to John Wilkes. He was commissioned as Colonel of the East Kent Militia in 1779 and held the command until his death.

== Family ==
Sawbridge had married firstly on 15 November 1763 Mary Diana Bridgeman, daughter of Sir Orlando Bridgeman, 2nd Baronet. She died without issue in 1764 and he married secondly Anne Stephenson daughter of Sir William Stephenson. His son Samuel Elias Sawbridge was Member of Parliament for Canterbury.

- Samuel Elias Sawbridge (7 January 1769 – 27 May 1850)
- Ann Sawbridge (born 20 June 1776)
- Wanly Sawbridge (born 9 June 1779)

Parliament of Great Britain
Preceded by Lord George Sackville; William Amherst	Member of Parliament for Hythe; 1768–1774; With: William Evelyn	Succeeded by Sir Charles Farnaby-Radcliffe, Bt; William Evelyn
Preceded by Barlow Trecothick; Thomas Harley; Frederick Bull; Richard Oliver	Member of Parliament for the City of London; 1774 – Sep. 1780; With: Richard Oliver; Frederick Bull; George Hayley	Succeeded by John Kirkman; Nathaniel Newnham; George Hayley; Frederick Bull
Preceded by John Kirkman; Nathaniel Newnham; George Hayley; Frederick Bull	Member of Parliament for the City of London; Nov 1780 – 1795; With: George Hayley 1774–81; Frederick Bull 1773–84; Nathaniel Newnham 1780–90; Sir Watkin Lewes 1781–96; Brook Watson 1784–93; William Curtis 1784–1818; John William Anderson from 1793	Succeeded by William Lushington; Sir Watkin Lewes; William Curtis; John William Anderson
