= George Hayley =

British merchant, shipowner, whaler and politician

George Hayley (1722–1781) was a British merchant, shipowner, whaler and politician who sat in the House of Commons from 1774 to 1781.

== Life and career ==
Hayley was the eldest son of George Hayley and his wife Hannah Hopkins. His initial career was that of cordwainer. By 1767 he was an agent importing whale oil from America. He owned three or four South Sea whaling vessels between 1775 and 1781.

He married Mary Storke, who was sister of John Wilkes and widow of Samuel Storke Jr., a merchant of London. (Note: The History of Parliament gives the name of Wilkes' first husband erroneously as Alexander Stock. The business relationships of Storke/Hayley and Storke/Hayley/Champion indicate that the entry in History of Parliament is incorrect, as do various biographical accounts of John Wilkes, which identify Mary's first husband as Storke or Stork.)

Hayley was elected Member of Parliament for City of London at the 1774 general election. He also became an alderman in 1774 and was a sheriff of London in 1775–6; also President of Lloyd's of London. He was returned as MP for the City at the 1780 general election. He was a poor speaker and his main concern was on behalf of merchants trading with America.

Hayley died on 30 August 1781.

== Notes ==
Parliament of Great Britain
Preceded by Frederick Bull; Barlow Trecothick; Richard Oliver; Thomas Harley	Member of Parliament for City of London; 1774–1781; With: Richard Oliver 1774-1780; John Sawbridge 1774-1780; John Kirkman 1780; Frederick Bull 1774-1781; Nathaniel Newnham 1780-1781; John Sawbridge 1780-1781; Watkin Lewes 1781-1781	Succeeded by Nathaniel Newnham; John Sawbridge; Watkin Lewes; Frederick Bull
