= Frederick Bull (Lord Mayor of London) =

British politician (c. 1714–1784)

Frederick Bull (c. 1714–1784) was Lord Mayor of London and a radical politician who sat in the House of Commons from 1773 to 1784.

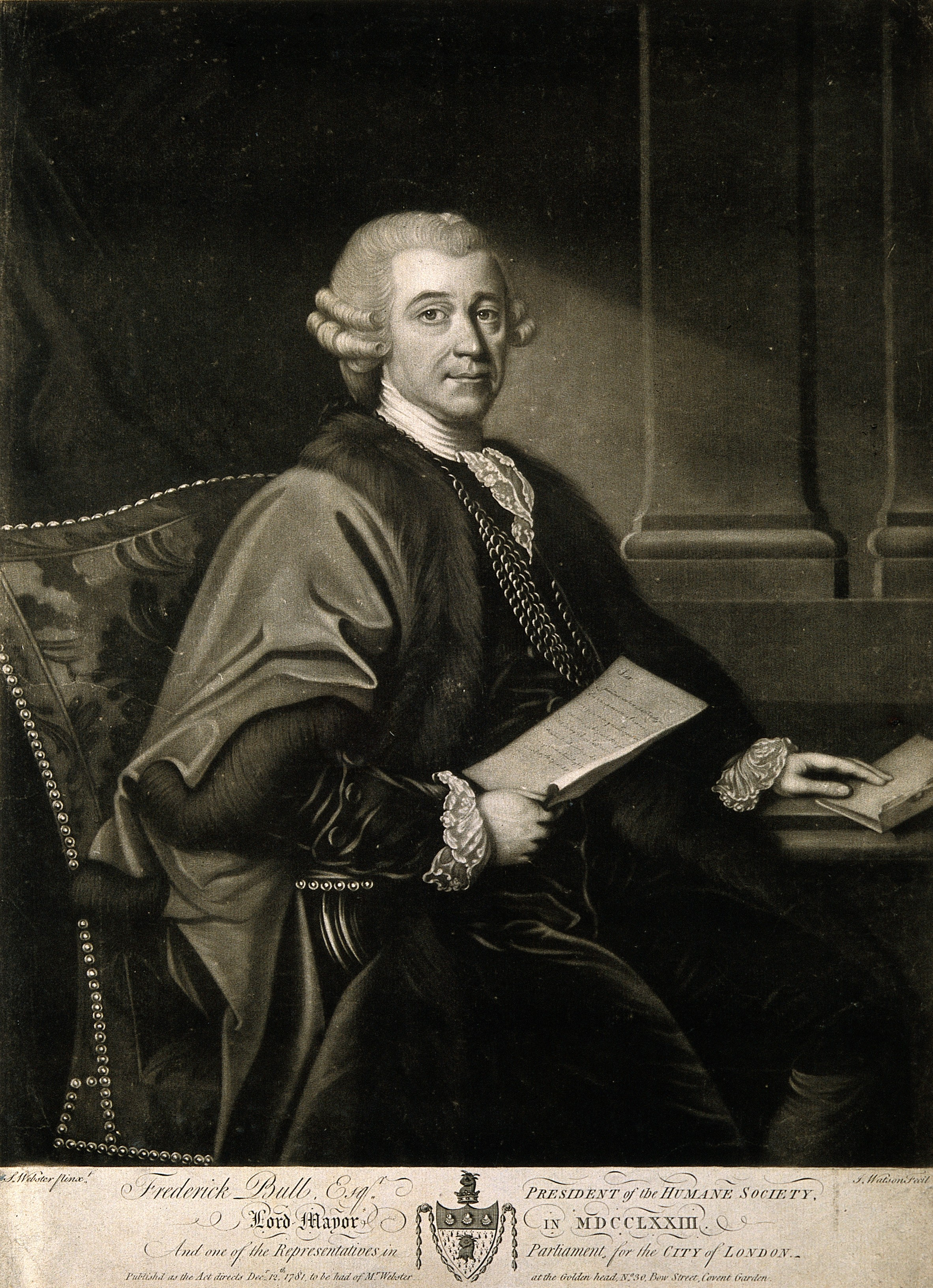
Frederick Bull, 1781

== Early life and business ==
Bull was the second son of John Bull of London, and his wife Hannah. He married Judith Dickinson of Ware on 26 August 1737. From about 1744 he was a tea merchant in Leadenhall Street. He succeeded to property at Little Paxton, Huntingdonshire from his mother in 1746. He went into partnership with Samuel Moody in around 1757.

== Public and political career ==
Bull was Sheriff of London in 1771–2 and became an alderman in 1772. He became Lord Mayor of London for 1773–74.

Bull stood for the City of London at a by-election in 1773 and was returned after a hard-fought contest on 23 December 1773. He was returned for the City after a contest again in 1774 and 1780.

Bull was a Dissenter and close supporter of John Wilkes. He followed the Bill of Rights Society programme throughout his parliamentary career. His politics were radical and anti-Popery and in the spring of 1780 he supported Lord George Gordon’s Protestant crusade which led to the riots in June.

== Later life ==
Bull retired from business about 1782. He died on 10 January 1784.

Parliament of Great Britain
Preceded by Robert Ladbroke; Barlow Trecothick; Richard Oliver; Thomas Harley	Member of Parliament for 1773–1784; With: Barlow Trecothick 1773-1774; Thomas Harley 1773-1774; Richard Oliver 1773-1780; John Sawbridge 1774-1780; George Hayley 1774-1781; John Kirkman 1780; Nathaniel Newnham 1780-1784; John Sawbridge 1780-1784; Watkin Lewes 1781-1784	Succeeded by Nathaniel Newnham; John Sawbridge; Watkin Lewes; Brook Watson
