= John Kirkman =

English politician

John Kirkman (1741 – 19 September 1780) was an English politician.

At the general election in September 1780, Kirkman was elected as one of the 4 MPs for the City of London. However, he died on 19 September 1780, the day when the polls closed. A by-election was held in November, which was won by John Sawbridge, one of the two MPs defeated in London at the general election.

Parliament of Great Britain
Preceded by John Sawbridge; Richard Oliver; George Hayley; Frederick Bull	Member of Parliament for the City of London; 1780; With: George Hayley; Frederick Bull; Nathaniel Newnham	Succeeded by John Sawbridge; George Hayley; Frederick Bull; Nathaniel Newnham
