= Brook Watson =

British merchant and politician (1735–1807)

Sir Brook Watson Bt
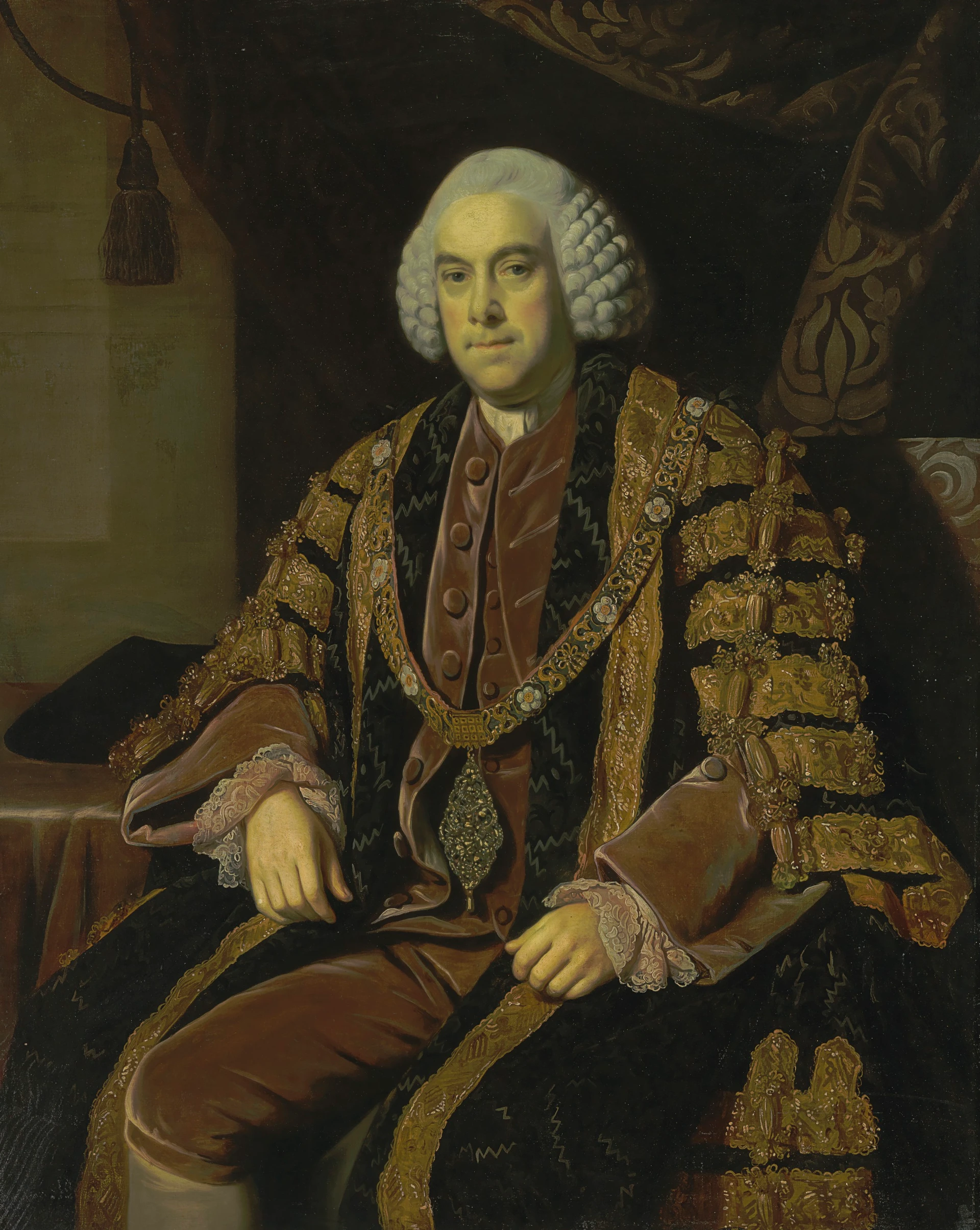
- Portrait by Nathaniel Dance-Holland, 1796
- Born: 7 February 1735; Plymouth, Devon
- Died: 2 October 1807 (aged 72); England
- Occupations: Merchant, politician
- Spouse: Helen Campbell

Sir Brook Watson, 1st Baronet (7 February 1735 – 2 October 1807), was a British merchant and politician who served as the Lord Mayor of London from 1796 to 1797. He is perhaps best known as the subject of John Singleton Copley's painting Watson and the Shark, which depicts a shark attack on Watson as a young man in Havana that resulted in the loss of his right leg below the knee.

== Early life ==
Watson was the only son of John Watson and Sarah Watson (née Schoefield). Born in Plymouth, Devon, in 1735, he was orphaned in 1741 and sent to live with his aunt and uncle in Boston, Massachusetts, in colonial America. His uncle was a merchant who traded in the West Indies. Before the age of 14, Watson had expressed his interest in the sea, so his uncle signed him up as a crew member on one of his merchant ships.

While swimming alone in Havana harbour, Cuba, in 1749, the 14-year-old Watson was attacked by a shark. The shark attacked twice before Watson was rescued. The first time, the shark removed flesh from below the calf of Watson's right leg; the second time, it bit off his right foot at the ankle. Watson was rescued by his shipmates, but his leg had to be amputated below the knee. Watson recuperated in a Cuban hospital and recovered within three months.

== Military career ==
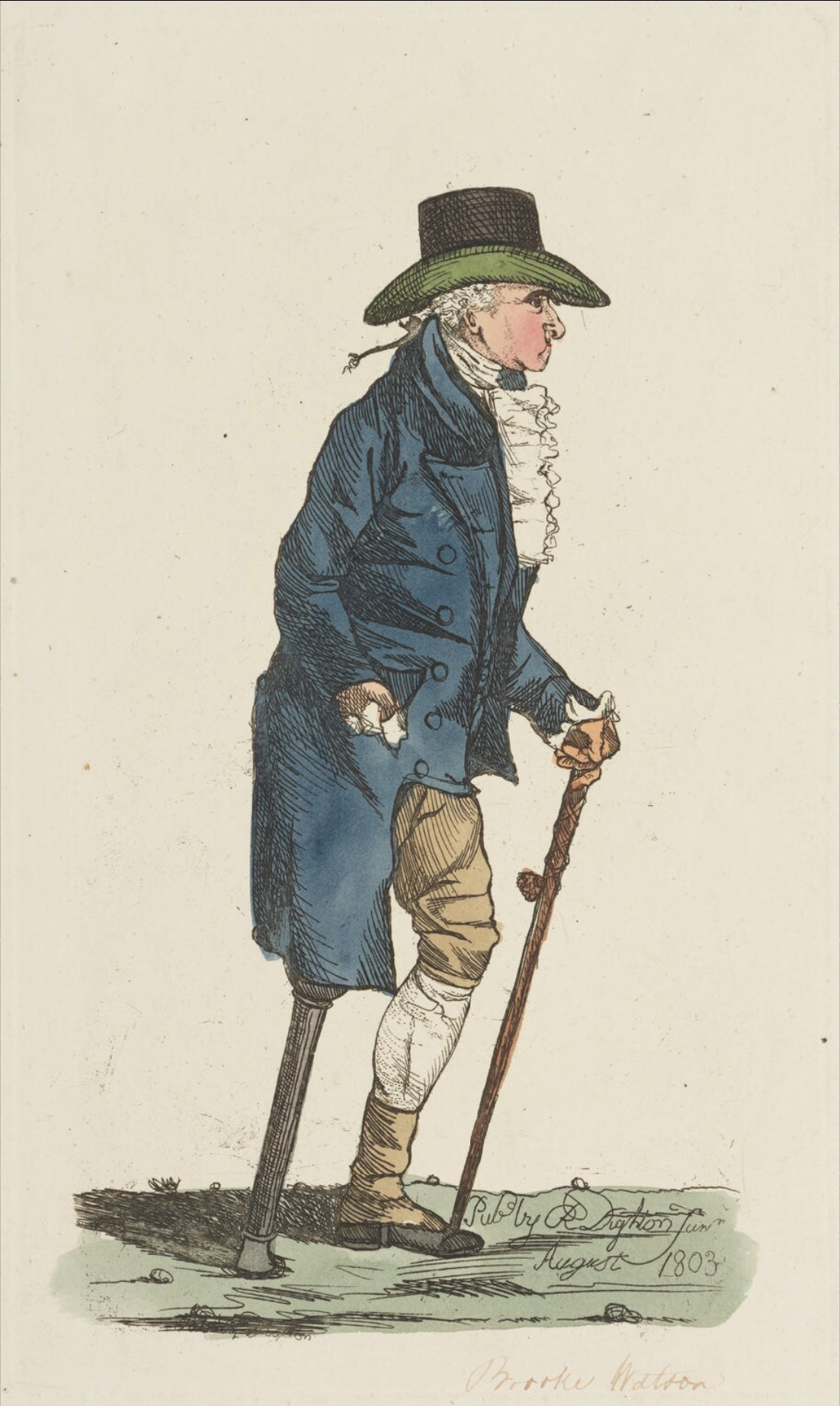
1803 caricature of Watson by Robert Dighton

On his return to Boston, Watson found that his uncle was bankrupt. He took a job under Captain John Huston on a schooner that supplied provisions to the British army at Fort Lawrence, Nova Scotia (1750). At Fort Lawrence, he came to the notice of Robert Monckton, and by 1755 he was commissary with Monckton at the Battle of Fort Beauséjour. Three years later he was sent to supervise the expulsion of the Acadians from the Baie Verte area. During the expulsion of the Acadians, he wrote that they were honest, industrious, sober and virtuous people. (Bona Arsenault, History and Genealogy of the Axadiens, p.135). He worked with the English trader Joseph Slayter, and in 1758 he was commissary under General James Wolfe at the Siege of Louisbourg (1758). He was known as 'the wooden-legged commissary'.

In 1759 Watson went to London to continue his mercantile career, and for a while, he was a partner with Joshua Maugher. Watson became a successful merchant, engaging in business in London, Montreal and Boston, amongst other places. In 1763 he obtained, with others, a land grant from the government of Nova Scotia of the county of Cumberland, which had been founded four years earlier.

== Business career ==
Watson was a member of the original committee of the Corporation of Lloyd's of London in 1772 and later served for ten years as its chairman. He combined his mercantile affairs with government business. He visited Massachusetts, New York and other colonies before the American Revolutionary War, during which time he intercepted letters to General Thomas Gage that were said to prove that Gage was a spy. Calling him 'a traitor', William Dunlap wrote that Watson "ingratiated himself with many leading Americans, obtained as much information on their designs as he could, and transmitted it to his chosen masters".

In November 1775 Watson accompanied American prisoner-of-war Ethan Allen on a voyage from Canada to England. Allen wrote that he "was put under the power of an English Merchant from London, whose name was Brook Watson: a man of malicious and cruel disposition, and who was probably excited, in the exercise of his malevolence, by a junto of tories, who sailed with him to England".

Watson was examined by the House of Commons of Great Britain in 1775, when Frederick North, Lord North's bill concerning the fisheries of the New England Colonies was before parliament. In 1782 he acted as Commissary General to the army commanded in North America by Sir Guy Carleton. Watson owned at least two South Sea whaling ships. These were Prince William Henry (1792–1795) and Brook Watson (1802–1810).

== Political career ==
After this, he returned to London, where he was elected to serve as an Alderman of the City. Watson served as a Member of Parliament for the City of London from 1784 until 1793. He was also Sheriff of London and Middlesex in 1785. Watson was agent for New Brunswick in London from 1786 until 1794, and Commissary-General to the Duke of York from 1793 to 1795. He was Lord Mayor of London in 1796. From 1793 to 1796 Watson served as Commissary General to the British Army in Flanders under the Duke of York, and from 1798 until 1806 served as Commissary-General of England. (Alexander Dallas refers to this office as the "Commissariat Office of the Treasury"). Watson served several terms as a director of the Bank of England between 1784 and 1807. During the British abolitionist debates of the 1790's, Watson publicly defended Britain's involvement in the Atlantic slave trade.

A verse penned by one of Watson's political enemies poked fun at his ordeal (and perhaps at his abilities):

Oh! Had the monster, who for breakfast ate
That luckless limb, his noblest noddle met,
The best of workmen, nor the best of wood,
Had scarce supply'd him with a head so good.

== Watson and the Shark ==
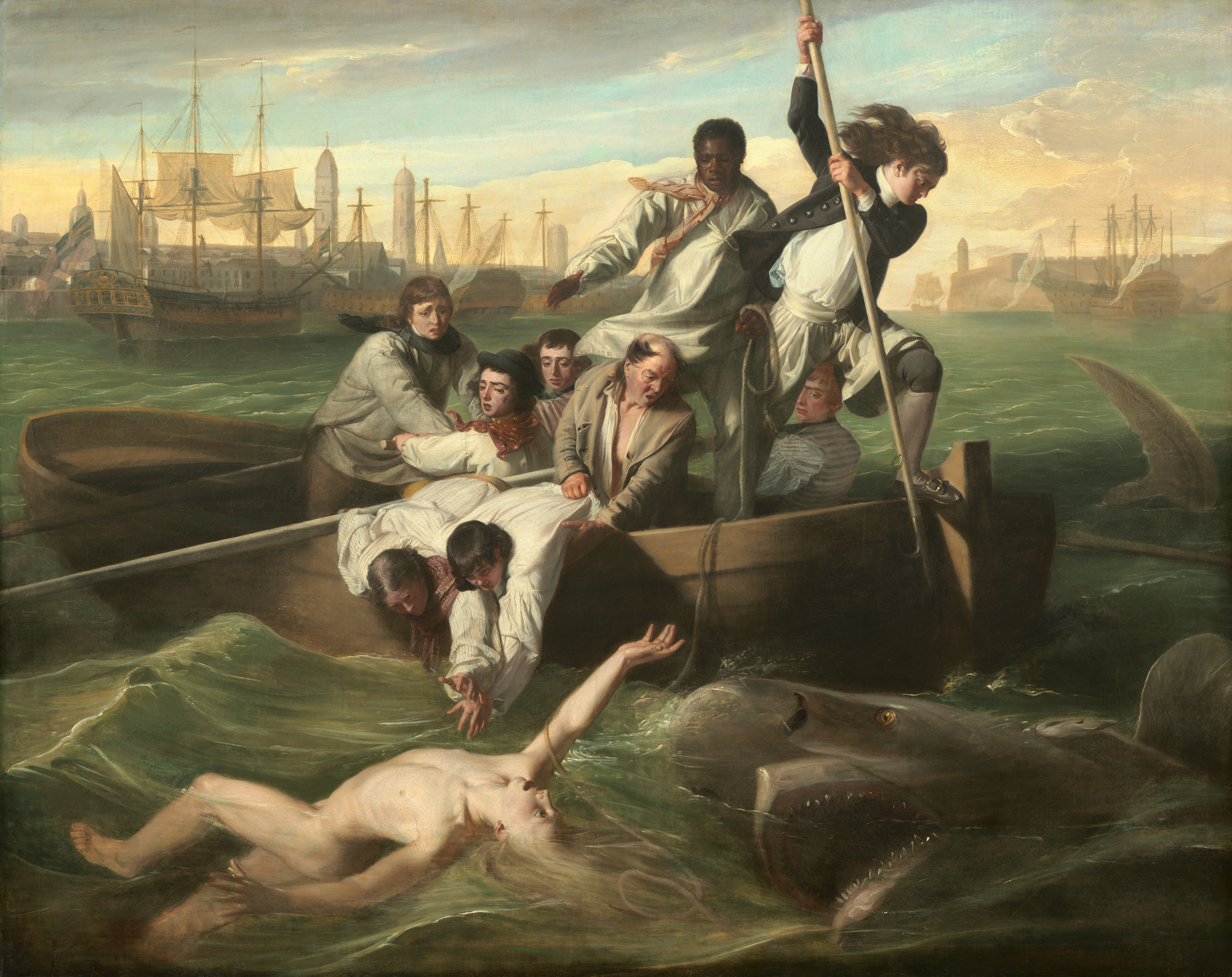
Copley's painting dramatically showed Watson's rescue by his shipmates in Havana harbour

Sources differ as to how Watson and the artist John Singleton Copley met in 1774: some say they travelled on the same ship from Boston to England, and some that they met in London. Whatever the circumstances of their meeting, Watson commissioned Copley to produce the work, known as Watson and the Shark which was completed in 1778. The painting was displayed at the Royal Academy Exhibition of 1778 and caused a sensation.

Today the text beneath the painting reads:

This picture representing a remarkable occurrence in the life of Brook Watson was bequeathed to the Royal Hospital of Christ in London by his will.

He was of a very good family in the North of England but having lost both his parents early in life was brought up by an aunt, and before the age of fourteen years manifested a strong predilection for the sea, which led to the misfortune represented in the picture.

He served in the Commissariat Department of the Army under the immortal Wolfe at Louisberg in 1758. In 1759 he was established as a merchant in London and was subsequently called upon to act as Commissary General to the Army in America commanded by Sir Guy Carleton, late Lord Dorchester.

On his return from that service he was elected an Alderman of the City of London and one of its representatives in parliament, and continued Member of the House of Commons till he was appointed to the situation of Commissary General to the Army under His Royal Highness the Duke of York, acting on the continent of Europe.

In 1796 he was chosen Lord Mayor and in 1803 created a baronet of the United Kingdom.

He died in 1807, an Alderman of the City of London, Deputy Governor of the Bank of England, &c, &c thus shewing that a high sense of integrity and rectitude with a firm reliance on an overruling providence united to activity and exertion are the sources of public and private virtue and the road to honours and respect. The picture was painted by John Singleton Copley Esq. Royal Academician in the year 1778.

Watson's will, dated 12 August 1803, stated: "I give and bequeath my Picture painted by Mr. Copley which represents the accident by which I lost my Leg in the Harbour of the Havannah in the Year One Thousand Seven Hundred and Forty Nine to the Governors of Christ's Hospital to be delivered to them immediately after the Decease of my Wife Helen Watson or before if she shall think proper so to do hoping the said worthy Governors will receive the same as a testimony of the high estimation in which I hold that most Excellent Charity and that they will allow it to be hung up in the Hall of their Hospital as holding out a most usefull [sic] Lesson to Youth". The school's Committee of Almoners accepted the painting in 1819. In 1963 it was purchased from Christ's Hospital by the National Gallery of Art, Washington, D.C.

== Personal life ==
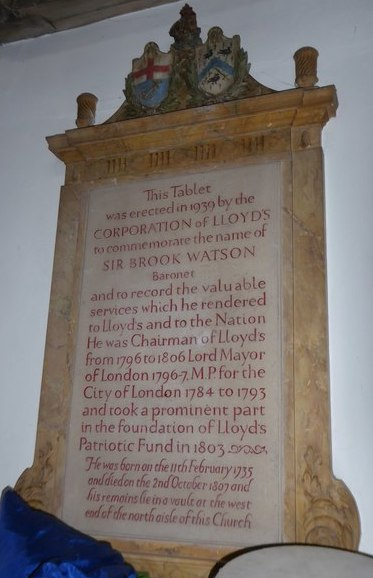
Memorial to Watson at St Mary the Virgin, Mortlake.

Watson married Helen Campbell in 1760. Her father was Colin Campbell, a goldsmith working in Edinburgh. The Watsons had no children. Watson was made a baronet on 5 December 1803. Watson's coat of arms was designed to reference his ordeal with the shark: underneath Neptune brandishing his trident, the shield bears Watson's severed right leg, with the Latin motto Scuto Divino ('Under God's Protection') below. In return for his services in North America, Parliament voted Watson's wife an annuity of £500 for life. Watson died in 1807. His baronetcy descended, by special remainder, to his grand-nephew William.

Parliament of Great Britain
Preceded by Frederick Bull; Nathaniel Newnham; John Sawbridge; Sir Watkin Lewes	Member of Parliament for London; 1784–1793; With: John Sawbridge 1784–1793; Sir Watkin Lewes 1784–1793; Nathaniel Newnham 1784–1790; Sir William Curtis, Bt 1790–1793	Succeeded by John Sawbridge; Sir Watkin Lewes; Sir William Curtis, Bt; Sir John Anderson, Bt
Civic offices
Preceded by William Curtis	Lord Mayor of London; 1796–1797	Succeeded by John William Anderson
Baronetage of the United Kingdom
New creation	Baronet (of East Sheen); 1803–1807	Succeeded by William Kay
