= John Wilkes Esq. =

1763 etching by William Hogarth

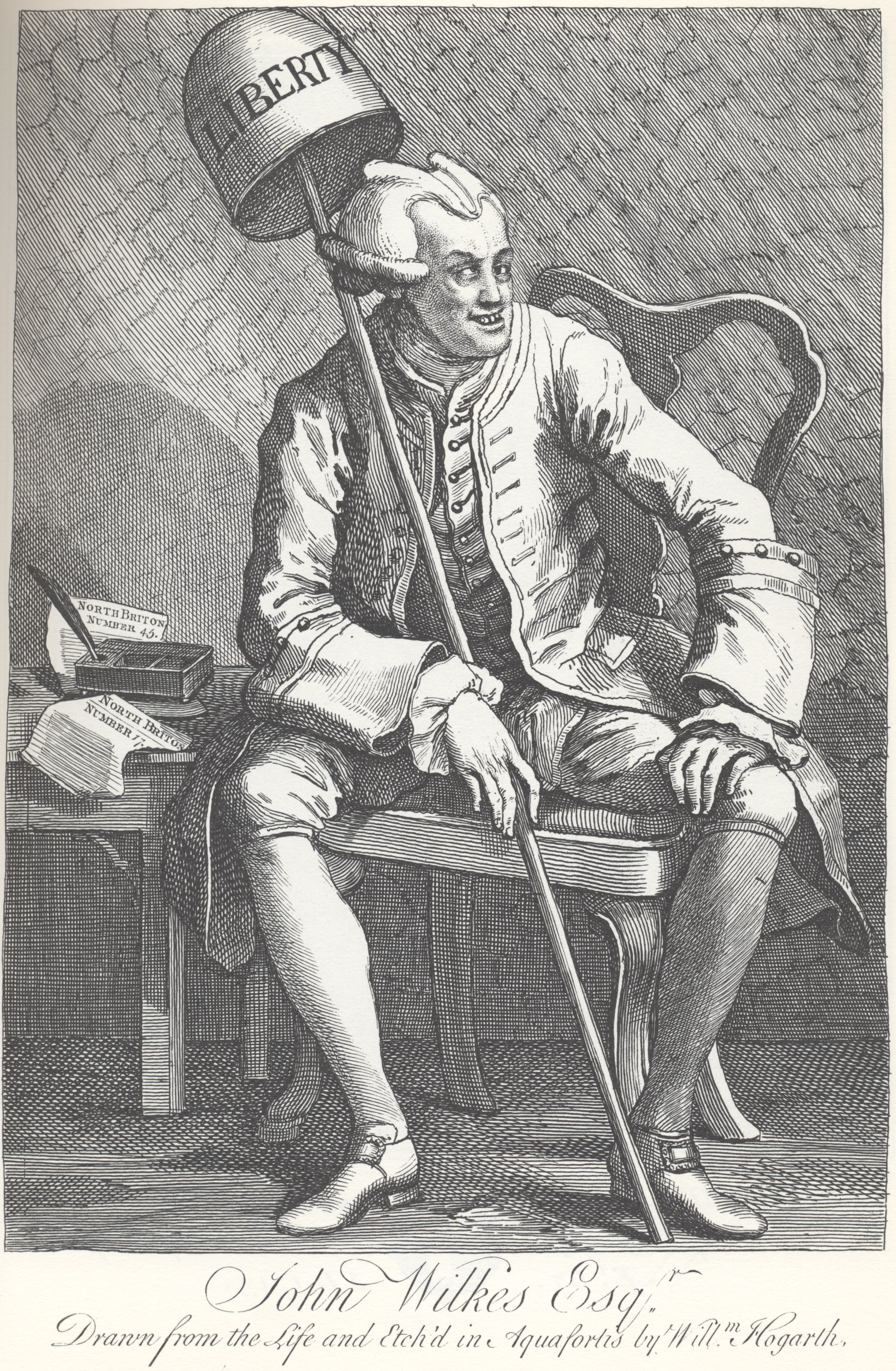
- Artist: William Hogarth
- Year: 1763
- Medium: Etching and engraving
- Dimensions: 36.4 cm × 23.4 cm (14.3 in × 9.2 in)
- Location: Metropolitan Museum of Art; New York City

John Wilkes Esq. is an etching and engraving of 1763 by the British artist William Hogarth. It depicts British radicalist politician John Wilkes. Wilkes was the publisher of The North Briton, which had issued many a broadside against Hogarth's work. Wilkes sits with the "Cap of Liberty" and the "Staff of Maintenance". His mouth and eyes are construed and twisted, and his wig has morphed into devilish horns.

== See also ==
- List of works by William Hogarth
