= John Glynn =

English lawyer and politician

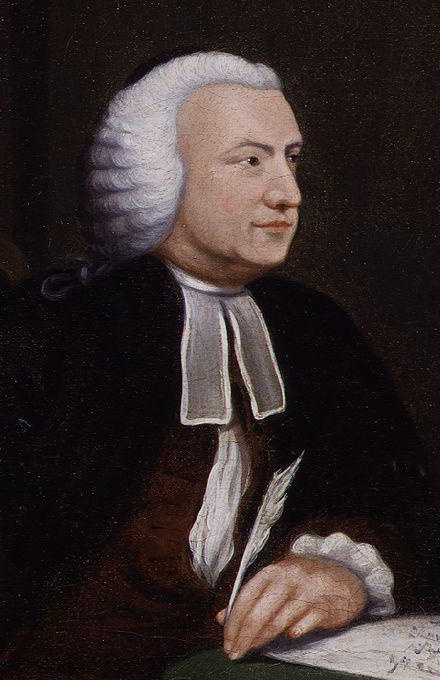
Portrait of John Glynn after Richard Houston, 1769

John Glynn Serjeant-at-law of Glynn (1722–1779) was an English lawyer and politician who sat in the House of Commons from 1768 to 1779. Glynn was born to a family of Cornish gentry. He inherited his father's estate at Glynn in the parish of Cardinham, Cornwall, on the deaths of his elder brother and his nephew.

Glynn was admitted to the Middle Temple on 21 January 1740–1741. On 28 January 1747/8, he was called to the Bar. In 1763, Glynn became serjeant-at-law, and in the following year Recorder of Exeter. Known for his skill as a pleader, Glynn was engaged in many celebrated cases. Elected to Parliament for Middlesex in 1768, Glynn served in Parliament until his death. In 1772, he was elected Recorder of London. Glynn's speeches in Parliament were highly praised. Glynn County, Georgia was named after John Glynn in recognition for his support for the cause of American independence in Parliament.

== Early life ==
The second son of William Glynn of Glynn House in Cardinham, Cornwall, who married Rose, daughter of John Prideaux of Prideaux Place, Padstow, he was baptised at Cardinham on 3 August 1722. He matriculated at Exeter College, Oxford, on 17 May 1738, but did not proceed to a degree. He was called to the bar at the Middle Temple in 1748. His elder brother died in June 1744, leaving an only son of weak intellect, against whom his uncle took out a commission in lunacy, and was appointed receiver of the family estates. The youth's mother was so much incensed that she left all her own property to distant connections. The lunatic died in December 1762, and Glynn came into the possession of his nephew's property.

== Legal career ==
On 24 January 1763 Glynn was created a serjeant-at-law, but as a result of his opinions in opposition to the court, he was never promoted to the rank of king's serjeant. In 1764 he was appointed recorder of Exeter. His position at the bar and his opinions brought Glynn to take the lead in the cases connected with John Wilkes. They were in close consultation throughout the summer of 1763. He then acted for Wilkes in his application for a writ of habeas corpus in May 1763, in the action against George Montagu-Dunk, 2nd Earl of Halifax, and in the trial which took place in 1764 on the republication of The North Briton in volumes. He was the advocate of John Almon in 1765, pleaded in the king's bench against the outlawry of Wilkes in 1768, and was counsel for Alderman James Townsend in his action in June 1772 against the collector of land tax, which Townsend had refused to pay, urging the nullity of Parliament through the irregularity of the Middlesex election.

Glynn represented Woodfall before Mansfield in the case of the Letters of Junius, of which a subset were alleged to constitute seditious libel. The verdict was mistrial; the Crown decided against further pursuit.

Glynn also enjoyed a large share of general business. His advocacy secured the acquittal of Miss Butterfield, accused of poisoning William Scawen.

== Politician ==
On a by-vacancy in the representation of Middlesex in 1768, Glynn was named by Wilkes, at the request of the majority of its freeholders, as the candidate in the "Wilkes and liberty" interest. John Horne Tooke was active in raising subscriptions to defray the election expenses. The ministerial candidate was Sir William Beauchamp Proctor, who had been ousted by Wilkes in March 1768.

On the first day of polling (8 December), armed ruffians with "Liberty" and "Proctor" in their hats stormed the polling booth at Brentford and one man was killed. This affair was the subject of popular engravings. After six days' polling, Glynn won by 1,542 votes to 1,278. When 1,565 freeholders of Middlesex addressed George III against the illegal act of the majority in the House of Commons, Glynn presented their petition, and in three cartoons at least he is represented on his knees presenting their address to the monarch (24 May 1769). At the dissolution in 1774 he was re-elected without opposition.

In the winter of 1770 Glynn, influenced by Lord Shelburne, moved for a committee to inquire into the administration of justice in cases relating to the press, and to settle the power of juries. He argued the question with John Dunning and Alexander Wedderburne. About the same time he was associated with Charles James Fox, Sir William Meredith and others in a committee on the modification of the criminal law. They deliberated for two years, and on their report a bill was introduced for the repeal of eight or ten statutes, but it was thrown out in the Lords. After meeting Glynn in 1770, Lord Chatham wrote, "I find him a most ingenious, solid, pleasing man, and the spirit of the constitution itself. I never was more taken by a first conversation in my life.

Glynn was one of the leading members of the Society of the Bill of Rights, which at the end of 1770 addressed a provocative letter to the American colonies. On 17 November 1772 Glynn was elected Recorder of London to replace James Eyre.

== Family and death ==
Glynn was married on 21 July 1763 to Susanna Margaret, third daughter of Sir John Oglander of Nunwell in the Isle of Wight. She had been born on 1 September 1744 and died at Catherine Place, Bath, on 20 May 1816. They had three sons and a daughter.

Glynn suffered from gout and had to be carried into the House in April 1769 to vote against the motion for seating Henry Luttrell for Middlesex. In 1778 a deputy was allowed on account of his illness to act for him as recorder. On 16 September 1779 he died, and was buried at Cardinham on 23 September.

== Works ==
Glynn edited in 1775–1776 eight numbers of The Whole Proceedings on the King's Commission of the Peace for the City of London.

Parliament of Great Britain
Preceded by George Cooke; John Wilkes	Member of Parliament for Middlesex; 1768–1779; With: John Wilkes 1768–1769, 1774–1779; Henry Luttrell 1769–1774	Succeeded by John Wilkes; Thomas Wood
