= Statue of John Wilkes =

Statue in London, England

Coordinates: 51.5159°N 0.1092°W

John Wilkes
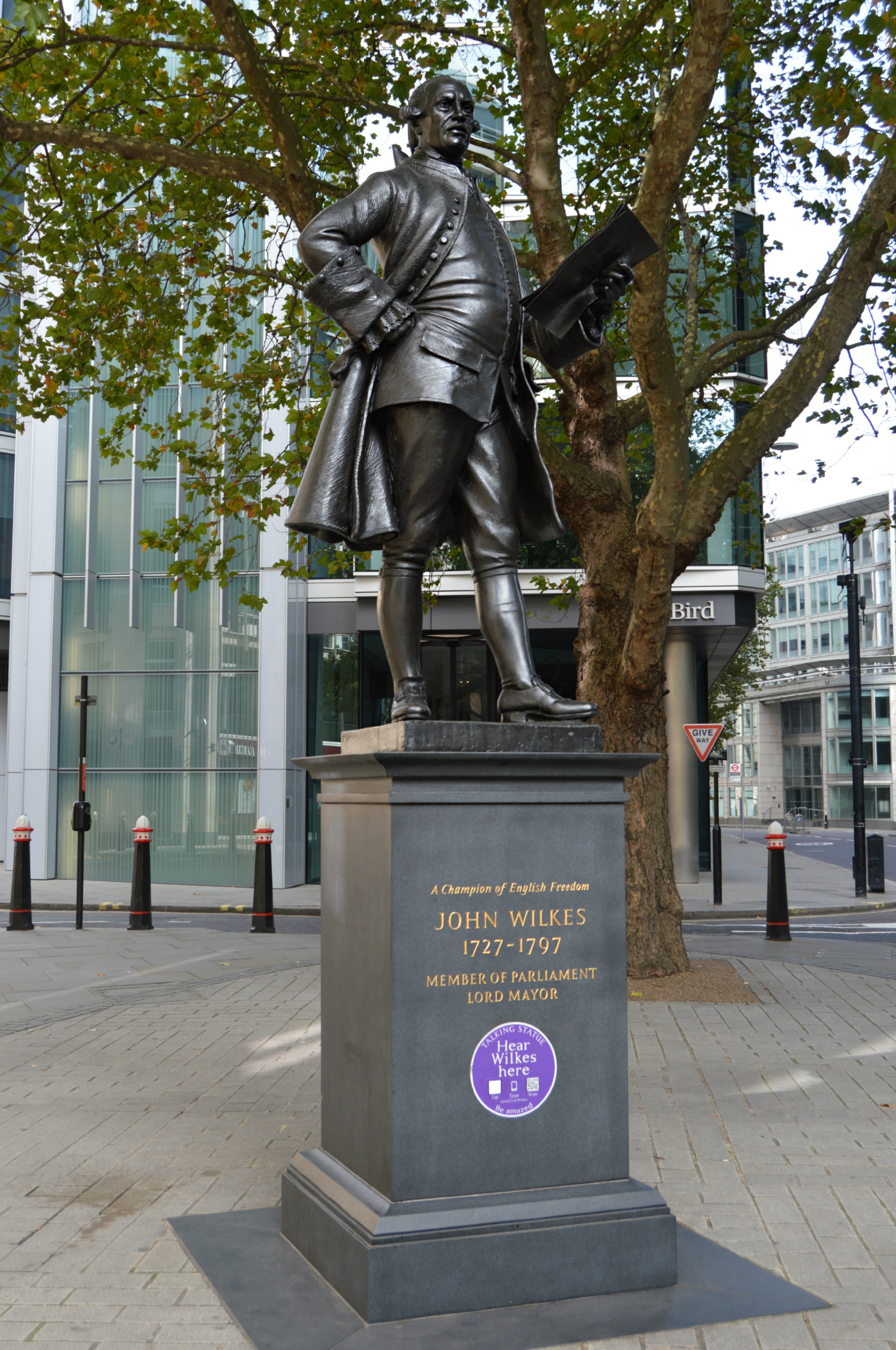
- Artist: James Butler
- Completion date: 1988
- Subject: John Wilkes
- Location: London

The statue of John Wilkes is a statue on Fetter Lane in the City of London.

John Wilkes was a radical politician who would serve as a Member of Parliament as well as Lord Mayor of London. Among other things Wilkes campaigned for voters' rights and freedom of the press, himself using his newspaper The North Briton to express his grievances with the government. His imprisonment in the Tower of London under a general warrant received such outrage as to make such warrants outlawed two years later.

The monument was largely the result of Dr James Cope's goal of earning John Wilkes a place of commemoration in the City. Funds were raised primarily from livery companies, newspapers and the City of London Corporation. It was designed by James Butler and unveiled in 1988 by Cope. The statue declares Wilkes as "A Champion of English Freedom", and notably depicts him characteristically cross-eyed, making it the only cross-eyed statue in London.
