= Brook Watson (1802 ship) =

History

Batavian Republic
- Launched: 1796
- Captured: c.1802

United Kingdom
- Name: Brook Watson
- Namesake: Brook Watson (Note: An earlier Brook Watson had been wrecked in December 1801 on the Gunfleet Sands in the North Sea off the coast of Essex. Brook Watson, of 158 tons (bm), had been launched in 1793 in New Brunswick.)
- Owner: 1802:Brook Watson, and/or William Goodall & John Turner; 1806:Turner
- Acquired: 1802 by purchase of a prize
- Fate: Last listed 1809/1810

General characteristics
- Tons burthen: 501, or 550(bm)
- Propulsion: Sails
- Complement: 1803:30; 1804:30
- Armament: 1803:12 × 6-pounder guns; 1804:14 × 6&9-pounder guns; 1809:12 × 9-pounder guns

Brook Watson was launched in 1796, probably in Holland but possibly in Denmark. She became a prize in 1801, and by 1802, was a whaler in the British Southern Whale Fishery. She made two whaling voyages between 1802 and 1806. She then became a West Indiaman and was last listed in 1809 or 1810.

== Origins ==
Both Lloyd's Register (LR) and the Register of Shipping described Brook Watson as a Dutch prize. LR further gave her build year as 1796. However, another report states that around 1801, a Mr. Bennett commissioned two Nantucket whale captains, Ransom Jones and Benjamin Swift, to purchase two Danish sloops of war that the British Government was selling. (Note: If this report is correct, Brook Watson may have been one of the vessels that the Royal Navy captured at the Battle of Copenhagen (1801).) Jones named his ship Africa, and Swift named his ship Brook Watson, after a son-in-law of Mr. Bennett. The ownership data for her whaling years gives her owners as Brook Watson, or Brook Watson, William Goodall, and John Turner.

== Career ==
Brook Watson first appeared in LR in 1802, with B.Swift, master, B.Watson, owner, and trade London–Southern Fishery.

1st whaling voyage (1802–1804): Captain Benjamin Swift sailed from England on 9 November 1802, bound for the South Atlantic. Brook Watson reached the Cape of Good Hope on 25 April 1803. War with France resumed in early 1803, and received a letter of marque on 17 November 1803. She sailed to Delago Bay, where Swift died. At the time there were several other whalers there, including Cyrus and Dolphin, who helped with the funeral arrangements. Brook Watson's mate took command and sailed her east of the Cape. By 5 February 1804, she was at the Isle of Desolation. Brook Watson gathered 1300 barrels of black oil that she took back to England. She was at St Helena on 8 May, and arrived back at Gravesend on 12 August 1804. At St Helena Brook Watson was one of several whalers that joined a convoy consisting of the East Indiamen that had been under the command of Captain Nathaniel Dance at the Battle of Pulo Aura, and that HMS Plantagenet escorted back to England.

2nd whaling voyage (1804–1804): Captain Obediah Worth, like Swift also from Nantucket, acquired a letter of marque on 14 September 1804. He sailed from England on 24 December 1804, bound for the Isle of Desolation. Brook Watson returned on 15 June 1806, with 4000 barrels of black oil.

West Indiaman: On her return from her second whaling voyage Brook Watson underwent small repairs and became a West Indiaman. Only with the 1809 issue did the Register of Shipping catch up. It showed her with Homes, master, Turner, owner, and trade London–Barbados. She had already sailed for Barbados on 10 November 1806. She sailed from Portsmouth on 4 January 1807, and arrived at Barbados on 25 February, and Jamaica on 11 April. She sailed back in convoy and arrived at Deal on 25 August. On 7 December, Brook Watson, Holmes, master, sailed from Deal for Jamaica. On 14 March she sailed from Antigua for Jamaica, where she arrived four days later.

Brook Watson rescued the crew of Maryann, of Guernsey, on 28 September 1808. Maryann had foundered while sailing from Jamaica to London.

== Fate ==
Brook Watson is last listed in the Register of Shipping in 1809 and in Lloyd's Register in 1810. There is no SAD data for her in 1808.
