= Thomas Harley (politician, born 1730) =

British politician

The Honourable Thomas Harley (24 August 1730 – 1 December 1804) was a British politician who sat in the House of Commons for 41 years from 1761 to 1802.

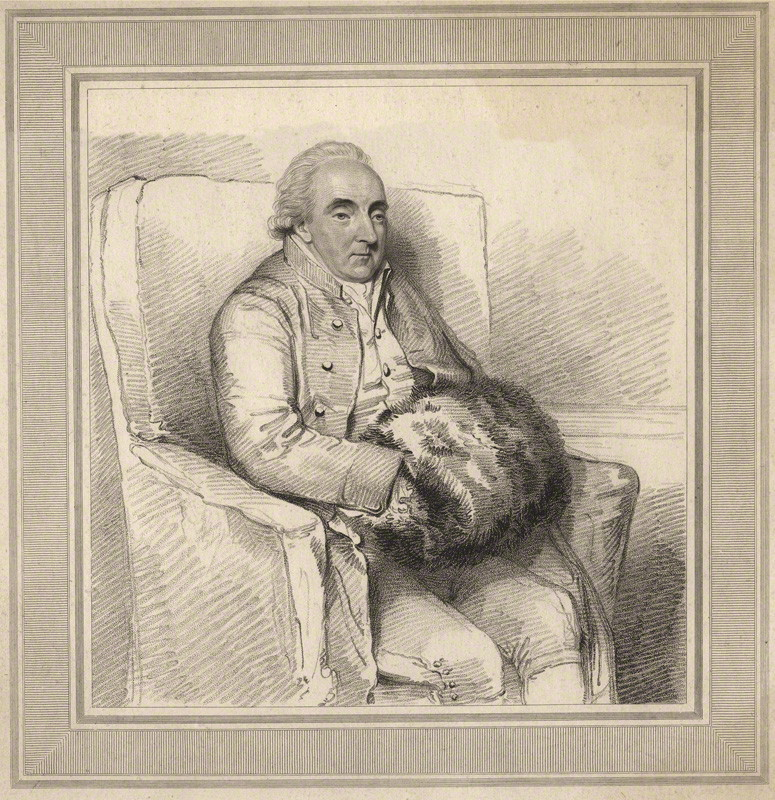
Thomas Harley

Harley was the fourth son of Edward Harley, 3rd Earl of Oxford and Earl Mortimer and educated at Westminster School.

He became an alderman of London, Sheriff of London in 1764 and Lord Mayor of London in 1767. He served as Member of Parliament for London from 1761 to 1774 and then for his native Herefordshire for most of the rest of his life.

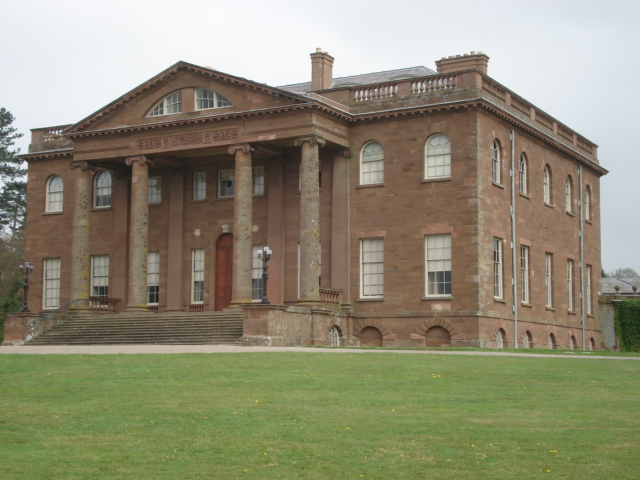
Berrington Hall, Herefordshire

In 1775 he bought the Berrington estate near Eye, Herefordshire from the Cornewall family and built Berrington Hall in 1778–1781 in place of an older house. It is now classified as a Grade I listed building.

He was elected Mayor of Shrewsbury for 1784–85 and appointed Lord Lieutenant of Radnorshire for April 1791 to August 1804.

He died in December, 1804. He had married in 1752, Anne, the daughter of Edward Bangham, deputy Auditor of the Imprest. They had two sons, who both predeceased him, and five daughters. He gave Berrington to his daughter Anne when she married George Rodney (1753–1802), the son of Admiral George Brydges Rodney, 1st Baron Rodney. Another daughter Martha married George Drummond of Stanmore.

== See also ==
- List of Lord Mayors of London
- List of Sheriffs of London

Parliament of Great Britain
Preceded by Sir John Barnard; Sir Robert Ladbroke; William Beckford; Sir Richard Glyn, Bt	Member of Parliament for London; 1761–1774; With: Sir Richard Glyn, Bt 1761–1768; William Beckford 1761–1770; Sir Robert Ladbroke 1771–1773; Barlow Trecothick 1768–1774; Richard Oliver 1770–1774; Frederick Bull 1773–1774	Succeeded by Richard Oliver; Frederick Bull; John Sawbridge; George Hayley
Preceded by Thomas Foley; Sir George Cornewall, Bt	Member of Parliament for Herefordshire; 1774–1801; With: Sir George Cornewall, Bt 1774–1780; Robert Biddulph 1780–1801	Succeeded by Parliament of the United Kingdom
Parliament of the United Kingdom
Preceded by Parliament of Great Britain	Member of Parliament for Herefordshire; 1801–1802; With: Robert Biddulph	Succeeded by John Cotterell; Sir George Cornewall, Bt
Honorary titles
Preceded by The Earl of Oxford and Mortimer	Lord Lieutenant of Radnorshire; 1790–1804	Succeeded by The Lord Rodney
