= Trecothick (ship) =

Two vessels have been named Trecothick for Barlow Trecothick:

- Trecothick (1770 ship) was launched on the Thames in 1770, probably under the same name. She first appeared at Trecothick in 1776 and was lost in 1781.
- Trecothick (1784 ship) was launched on the Thames in 1773 under another name. She first appeared at Trecothick in 1784 and was lost in 1786.
