= Society of Gentlemen Supporters of the Bill of Rights =

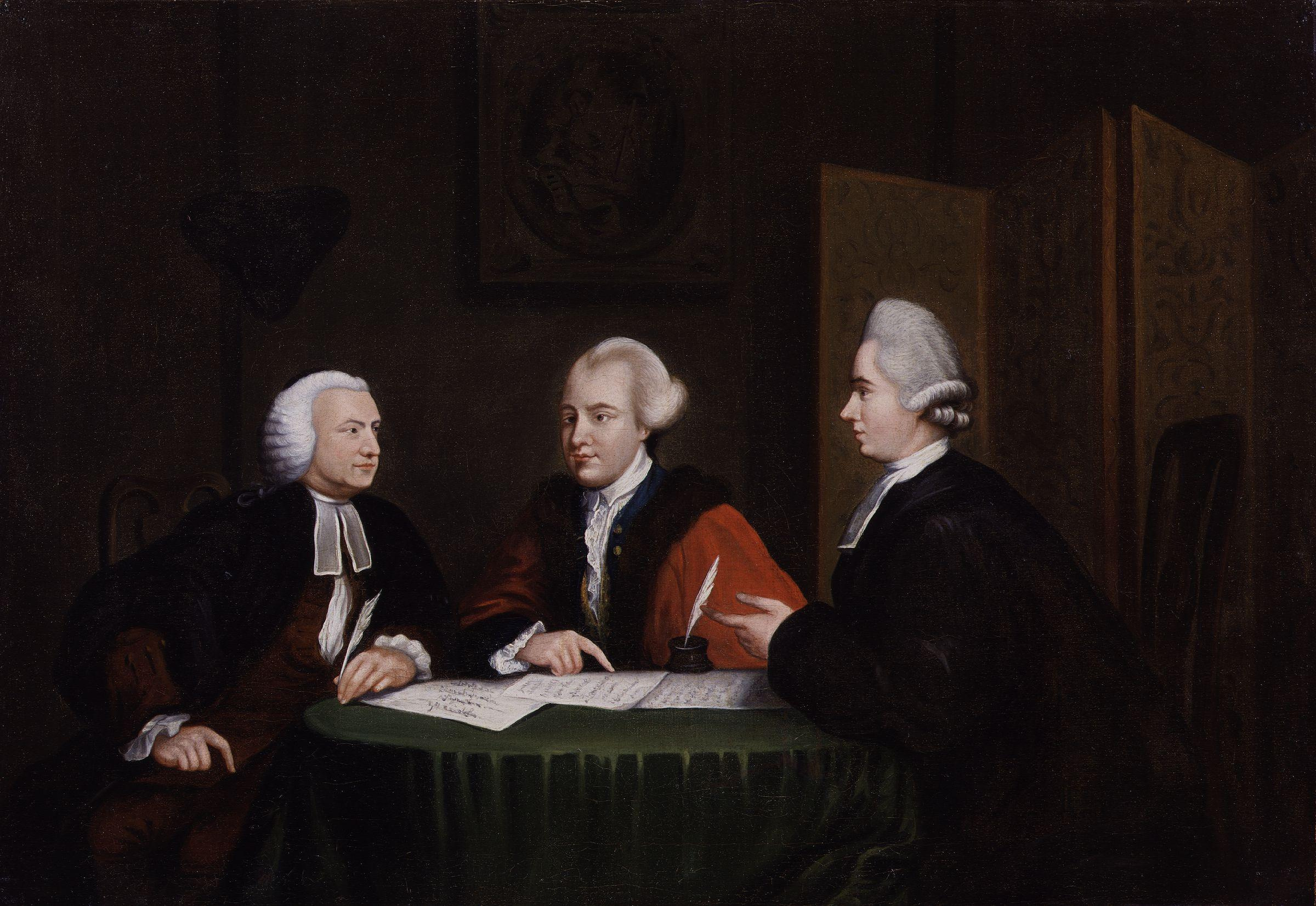
- A portrait of John Glynn, John Wilkes and John Horne Tooke.
- Leader: John Wilkes
- Chairman: John Glynn
- Secretary: Robert Morris
- Founded: 20 February 1769
- Dissolved: c. 1776
- Succeeded by: Society for Constitutional Information
- Headquarters: London Tavern, Bishopsgate, London
- Membership (1769): 400
- Ideology: Constitutionalism; Radicalism
- Political position: Left-wing
- National affiliation: Radicals

The Society of Gentlemen Supporters of the Bill of Rights was a British pressure group formed on 20 February 1769 to support John Wilkes after he was expelled from the House of Commons.

The Society was formed at the London Tavern in Bishopsgate in London. The lawyer John Glynn was elected as chairman. The members believed George III was using the royal prerogative to invade the rights of electors to elect their representatives. They were named after the Bill of Rights 1689 which placed limits on the power of the monarch.

In order to enable Wilkes to continue campaigning, the Society wanted to pay off Wilkes' debts. The preamble to the Society's charter read: "Whereas John Wilkes, Esq., has suffered very greatly in his private fortune, from the severe and repeated persecutions he has undergone in behalf of the public, and as it seems reasonable to us, that the man who suffers for the public good, should be supported by the public". John Horne Tooke argued that the Society should send money to printers who had been jailed for printing tracts supporting liberty. Wilkes, seeing this as a diversion from paying off his debts, invited his friends to flood the next meeting of the Society to vote against this proposal. On 9 April 1771, the Society split, with Tooke, Richard Oliver, James Townsend, John Sawbridge, Glynn and many others forming their own Constitutional Society. This left the Bill of Rights Society under Wilkes' leadership with 63 members, with Wilkes abandoning his attempt to limit the Society's funds for himself alone.

On 23 July 1771, the Society published a manifesto calling for annual Parliaments, the exclusion of placemen and pensioners from the House of Commons, outlawing bribery in elections, the "full and equal representation of the people", the abolition of all excise taxes and for America not to be taxed without her consent.

== Bibliography ==
- Cash, Arthur H. (2006). John Wilkes. The Scandalous Father of Civil Liberty. New Haven: Yale University Press. ISBN 0300108710. OCLC 851982043.
