= John Wilkes =

British radical, journalist and politician (1725–1797)

John Wilkes MP FRS
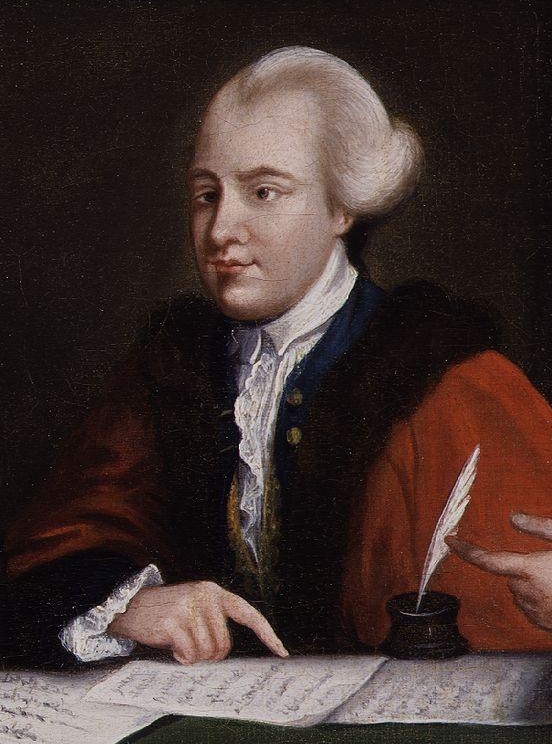
- Portrait by Richard Houston, 1769

Parliamentary offices
- 1757–1764: Member of Parliament for Aylesbury
- 1768–1769: Member of Parliament for Middlesex
- 1774–1790: Member of Parliament for Middlesex

Civic offices
- 1754–1755: High Sheriff of Buckinghamshire
- 1771–1772: Sheriff of London
- 1774–1775: Lord Mayor of London

Personal details
- Born: 17 October 1725 Clerkenwell, London, Great Britain
- Died: 26 December 1797 (aged 72) Westminster, London, Great Britain
- Resting place: Grosvenor Chapel
- Party: Radical
- Spouse: Mary Meade (m. 1747; sep. 1756)
- Children: 3
- Relatives: Mary Hayley (sister)
- Education: Leiden University

Military service
- Rank: Colonel
- Commands: Buckinghamshire Militia
- Battles/wars: Gordon Riots
- Writing career
- Language: English
- Notable works: An Essay on Woman; The North Briton
- Movement: Radicalism

John Wilkes (17 October 1725 – 26 December 1797) was a British radical, journalist, politician, magistrate and writer. He was first elected a Member of Parliament in 1757. In the Middlesex election dispute, he fought for the right of his voters – rather than the House of Commons – to determine their representatives. In 1768, angry protests of his supporters were suppressed in the Massacre of St George's Fields. In 1771, he was instrumental in obliging the government to concede the right of printers to publish verbatim accounts of parliamentary debates. In 1776, he introduced the first bill for parliamentary reform in the British Parliament.

During the American War of Independence, Wilkes was an active supporter of the Patriots’ cause, and the Patriots in turn supported his ardent defense of constitutional rights. In an existential respect the Patriots found their political fate bound up with Wilkes’ overseas fight against arbitrary exercise of governmental power, and the slogan “Wilkes and Liberty” became a popular rallying cry in the colonies. In 1780 he commanded militia forces which helped put down the Gordon Riots, damaging his popularity with many British radicals. This marked a turning point, leading him to embrace increasingly conservative policies which caused dissatisfaction among the radical low- to middle-income landowners. This was instrumental in the loss of his Middlesex parliamentary seat in the 1790 general election. At the age of 65, Wilkes retired from politics and took no part in the social reforms following the French Revolution, such as Catholic emancipation in the 1790s. During his life, he earned a reputation as a libertine.

== Early life and character ==
Born in the Clerkenwell neighborhood of central London, John Wilkes was the third child of distiller Israel Wilkes Jr. and Sarah Wilkes, née Heaton. His siblings included: eldest sister Sarah Wilkes, born 1721; elder brother Israel Wilkes III (1722–1805); younger brother Heaton Wilkes (1727–1803); younger sister Mary Hayley, née Wilkes (1728–1808); and youngest sister Ann Wilkes (1736–1750), who died from smallpox at the age of 14.

John Wilkes was educated initially at an academy in Hertford; this was followed by private tutoring and finally a stint at the University of Leiden in the Dutch Republic. There he met Andrew Baxter (metaphysician), a Presbyterian clergyman who greatly influenced Wilkes' views on religion. Although Wilkes remained in the Church of England throughout his life, he had a deep sympathy for non-conformist Protestants and was an advocate of religious tolerance from an early age. Wilkes was also beginning to develop a deep patriotism for his country. During the Jacobite rebellion of 1745, he rushed home to London to join a Loyal Association and readied to defend the capital. Once the rebellion had ended after the Battle of Culloden, Wilkes returned to the Netherlands to complete his studies.

In 1747, he married Mary Meade (1715–1784) and came into possession of an estate and income in Buckinghamshire. They had one child, Mary (known as Polly), to whom John was utterly devoted for the rest of his life (and she to him - she never married.) Wilkes and Mary, however, separated in 1756, a separation that became permanent. Wilkes never married again, but he gained a reputation as a rake. He was known to have fathered two other children, John Henry Smith and Harriet Wilkes.

Wilkes was elected a Fellow of the Royal Society in 1749 and appointed High Sheriff of Buckinghamshire in 1754. He was an unsuccessful candidate for Berwick in the 1754 parliamentary elections but was elected for Aylesbury in 1757 and again in 1761. Elections took place at St Mary the Virgin's Church, Aylesbury where he held a manorial pew. He lived at the Prebendal House, Parsons Fee, Aylesbury.

He was a member of the Knights of St Francis of Wycombe, also known as the Hellfire Club or the Medmenham Monks, and was the instigator of a prank that may have hastened its dissolution. The club had many distinguished members, including John Montagu, 4th Earl of Sandwich, and Sir Francis Dashwood. Wilkes reportedly brought a mandrill, dressed in a cape and horns and his natural features made even more striking with daubs of phosphorus, into the rituals performed at the club, producing considerable mayhem among the inebriated initiates.

Wilkes was notoriously ugly, being called the ugliest man in England at the time. He possessed an unsightly squint and protruding jaw, but he had a charm that carried all before it. He boasted that it "took him only half an hour to talk away his face", though the duration required changed on the several occasions Wilkes repeated the claim. He also declared that "a month's start of his rival on account of his face" would secure him the conquest in any love affair.

He was well known for his verbal wit and his snappy responses to insults. For instance, when told by a constituent that he would rather vote for the devil, Wilkes responded: "Naturally." He then added: "And if your friend decides against standing, can I count on your vote?"

In an exchange with John Montagu, 4th Earl of Sandwich, where the latter exclaimed, "Sir, I do not know whether you will die on the gallows or of the pox," Wilkes is reported to have replied: "That depends, my lord, on whether I embrace your lordship's principles or your mistress." Fred R. Shapiro, in The Yale Book of Quotations (2006), disputes the attribution based on a claim that it first appeared in a book published in 1935, but it is ascribed to Wilkes in Henry Brougham's Historical Sketches (1844), related from Bernard Howard, 12th Duke of Norfolk, who claims to have been present, as well as in Charles Marsh's Clubs of London (1828). Brougham notes the exchange had in France previously been ascribed to Honoré Gabriel Riqueti, comte de Mirabeau and Cardinal Jean-Sifrein Maury.

== Militia career ==
Wilkes began his parliamentary career as a follower of William Pitt the Elder and enthusiastically supported Britain's involvement in the Seven Years War of 1756–1763. When the Buckinghamshire Militia was reformed in 1759 he was commissioned as one of the captains by his friend Dashwood, who was the Lord Lieutenant of Buckinghamshire. He was regarded as a conscientious officer and rose to be lieutenant-colonel of the regiment. In May 1762 he was commanding the regiment at Winchester guarding prisoners of war held in the King's House when a group of 24 Frenchmen got out through a large drain. They were spotted by a vigilant sentry who challenged and then fired on them, alerting the other guards. In the scuffle two prisoners were wounded and only four got away into the fields where they were subsequently hunted down by the Bucks Militia. Wilkes rewarded the sentry with a week's leave. When Dashwood was appointed Chancellor of the Exchequer in May 1762 he gave up the colonelcy, and recommended Wilkes as his successor, despite his growing notoriety. Wilkes briefly commanded the whole camp at Winchester, but Lord Bute's administration soon sent a senior Regular officer to supersede him. Wilkes entertained well, including a dinner for the officers of the North Hampshire Militia, among them the historian Edward Gibbon, who recorded Wilkes's "bawdy conversation". The war was coming to an end, and the militia was disembodied at the end of 1762. Colonel Wilkes treated his entire regiment to a 'farewell drink' that lasted three days.

== Radical journalism ==
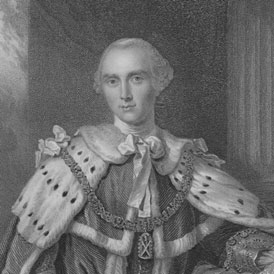
Lord Bute, prime minister between 1762 and 1763, and a major target for Wilkes' paper The North Briton. It angered Wilkes that Bute had displaced Pitt the Elder, and he attacked the terms of the Treaty of Paris (1763).

When the Scottish John Stuart, 3rd Earl of Bute, came to head the government in 1762, Wilkes started a radical weekly publication, The North Briton, to attack him, using an anti-Scots tone. Typical of Wilkes, the title made satirical reference to a pro-government newspaper, The Briton, with "North Briton" referring to Scotland. Wilkes became particularly incensed by what he regarded as Bute's betrayal in agreeing to overly generous peace terms with France to end the war.

On 5 October 1762, Wilkes fought a duel with William Talbot, 1st Earl Talbot. Talbot was the Lord Steward and a follower of Bute; he challenged Wilkes to a pistol duel after being ridiculed in issue 12 of The North Briton. The encounter took place at Bagshot – at night, to avoid attracting judicial attention. At a range of eight yards, Talbot and Wilkes both fired their pistols but neither was hit. Somewhat reconciled, they then went to a nearby inn and shared a bottle of claret. When the affair later became widely known, some viewed it as comical, and a satirical print made fun of the duellists. Some commentators even denounced the duel as a stunt, stage-managed to enhance the reputations of both men.

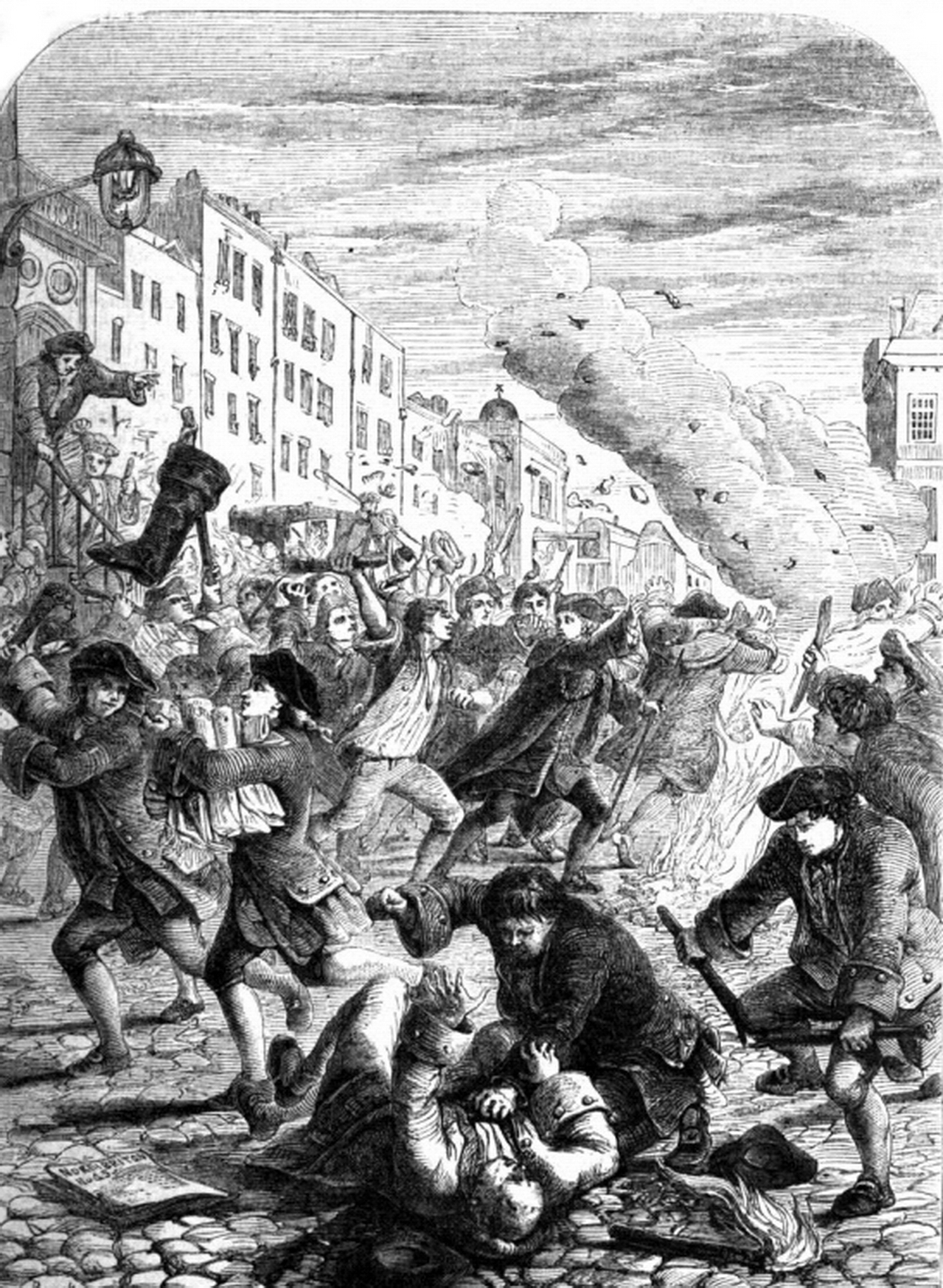
Riots in 1763 to stop the burning of issue No. 45 of The North Briton

Wilkes faced a charge of seditious libel over attacks on George III's speech endorsing the Paris Peace Treaty of 1763 at the opening of Parliament on 23 April 1763. Wilkes was highly critical of the King's speech, which was recognised as having been written by Bute. He attacked it in an article of issue 45 of The North Briton. The issue number in which Wilkes published his critical editorial was appropriate because the number 45 was synonymous with the Jacobite Rising of 1745, commonly known as "The '45". Popular perception associated Bute – Scottish, and politically controversial as an adviser to the King – with Jacobitism, a perception that Wilkes played on.

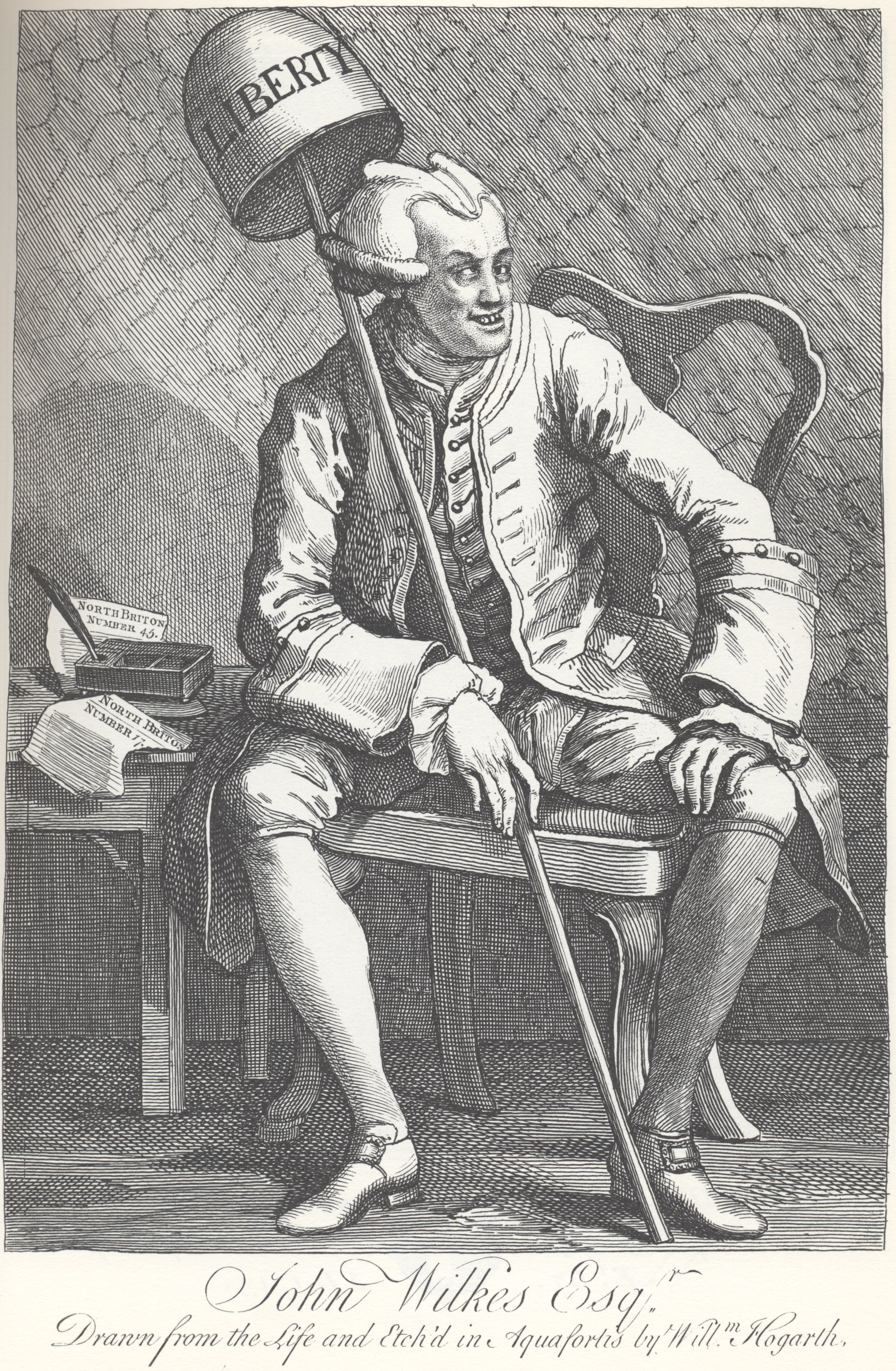
"John Wilkes Esq.", a satirical engraving by William Hogarth, who shows him with a demonic-looking wig, crossed eyes, and two editions of his The North Briton: Numbers 17 (in which he attacked, among others, Hogarth) and the famous 45

The King felt personally insulted and ordered the issuing of general warrants for the arrest of Wilkes and the publishers on 30 April 1763. Forty-nine people, including Wilkes, were arrested, but general warrants were unpopular, and Wilkes gained considerable popular support as he asserted their unconstitutionality. At his court hearing he claimed that parliamentary privilege protected him, as an MP, from arrest on a charge of libel. Chief Justice Pratt ruled that parliamentary privilege did indeed protect him and he was soon restored to his seat. Wilkes sued his arresters for trespass. As a result of this episode, people were chanting, "Wilkes, Liberty and Number 45", referring to the newspaper. Parliament swiftly voted in a measure that removed protection of MPs from arrest for the writing and publishing of seditious libel.

Bute had resigned (8 April 1763), but Wilkes opposed Bute's successor as chief advisor to the King, George Grenville, just as strenuously. On 4 May 1763, Grenville – himself a former officer of the Bucks Militia – ordered his brother Richard Grenville-Temple, 2nd Earl Temple, as Lord Lieutenant of Buckinghamshire to dismiss Wilkes from his militia command. Wilkes was afterwards accused of fraud concerning the clothing of the regiment, a charge that he denied.

On 16 November 1763, Samuel Martin, a supporter of George III, challenged Wilkes to a duel. Martin shot Wilkes in the belly.

== Outlaw ==
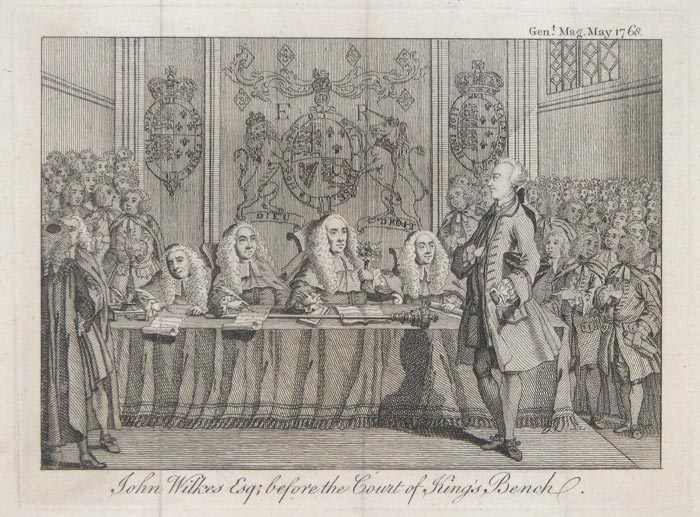
"John Wilkes Esq; before the Court of King's Bench", engraving from The Gentleman's Magazine for May 1768

Wilkes and Thomas Potter wrote a pornographic poem dedicated to the courtesan Fanny Murray entitled "An Essay on Woman" as a parody of Alexander Pope's "An Essay on Man".

Wilkes's political enemies, foremost among them John Montagu, 4th Earl of Sandwich, who was also a member of the Hellfire Club, obtained the parody. Sandwich had a personal vendetta against Wilkes that stemmed in large part from embarrassment caused by a prank of Wilkes involving the Earl at one of the Hellfire Club's meetings; he was delighted at the chance for revenge. Wilkes had frightened Sandwich during a seance put on by the club. Sandwich read the poem to the House of Lords in an effort to denounce Wilkes's moral behaviour, despite the hypocrisy of his action. The Lords declared the poem obscene and blasphemous, and it caused a great scandal. The House of Lords moved to expel Wilkes again; he fled to Paris before any expulsion or trial. He was tried and found guilty in absentia of obscene libel and seditious libel, and was declared an outlaw on 19 January 1764.

Wilkes hoped for a change in power to remove the charges, but this did not come to pass. As his French creditors began to pressure him, in 1768 he had little choice but to return to England. He returned intending to stand as a Member of Parliament on an anti-government ticket; the government did not issue warrants for his immediate arrest as it did not want to inflame popular support.

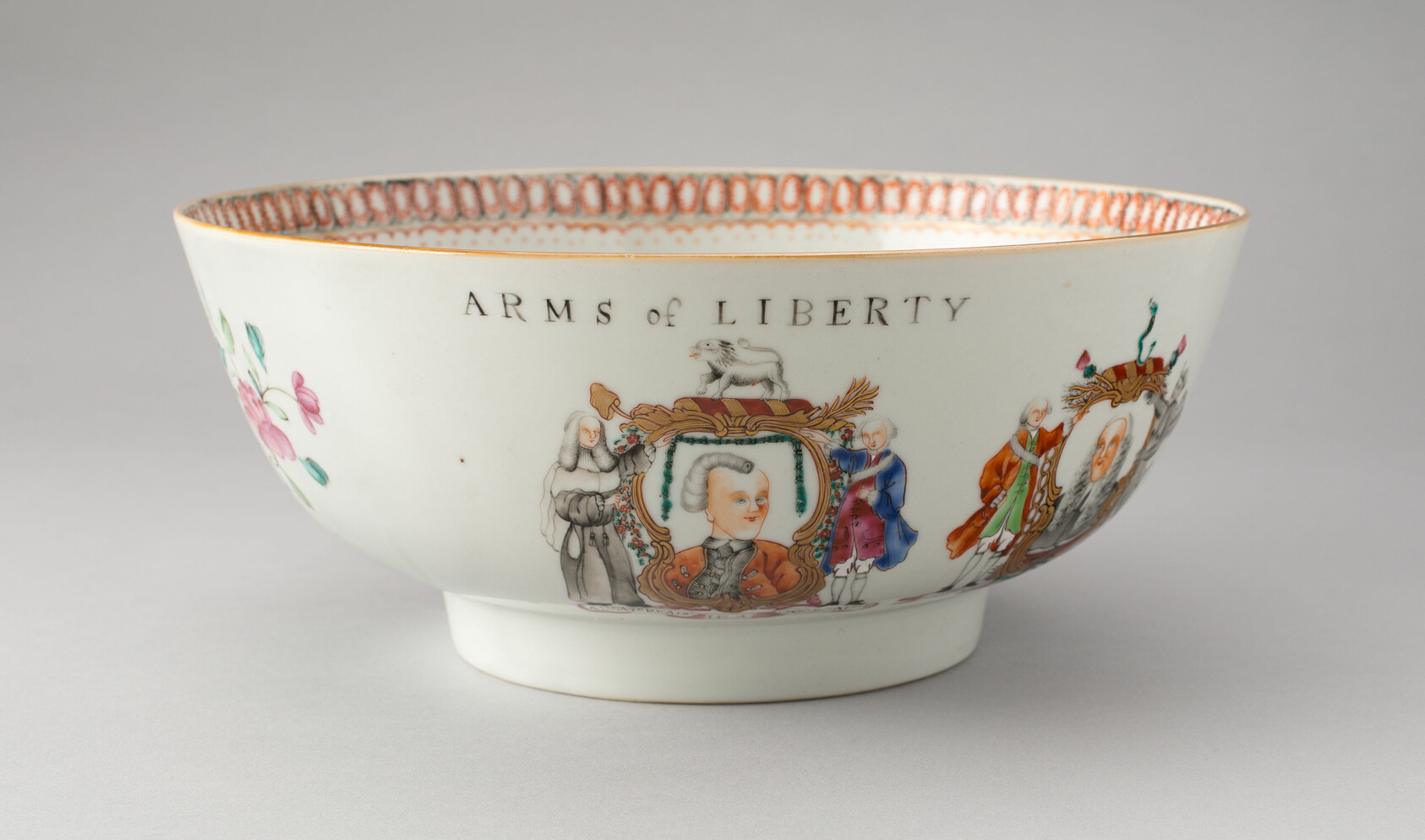
The Arms of Liberty Punch Bowl, commemorating Wilkes actions on 1768 (1769, Art Institute of Chicago)

Wilkes stood in the City of London and came in bottom of the poll of seven candidates, possibly due to his late entry into the race for the position. He was quickly elected as a Radical Member of Parliament for Middlesex, where most of his support was located. He surrendered himself to the King's Bench in April. On waiving his parliamentary privilege to immunity, he was sentenced by Judge Joseph Yates to two years and fined £1,000; the Lords' sentence of outlawry was overturned.

When Wilkes was imprisoned in the King's Bench Prison on 10 May 1768, his supporters gathered nearby on St George's Fields, London, chanting "Wilkes and Liberty." Troops opened fire on the unarmed men, killing several of them and wounding fifteen, an incident that came to be known as the Massacre of St George's Fields. The Irish playwright Hugh Kelly, a prominent supporter of the government, defended the right of the army to use force against rioters, which drew the anger of Wilkes' supporters and they began a riot at the Drury Lane Theatre during the performance of Kelly's new play A Word to the Wise, forcing it to be abandoned.

== Middlesex election dispute ==
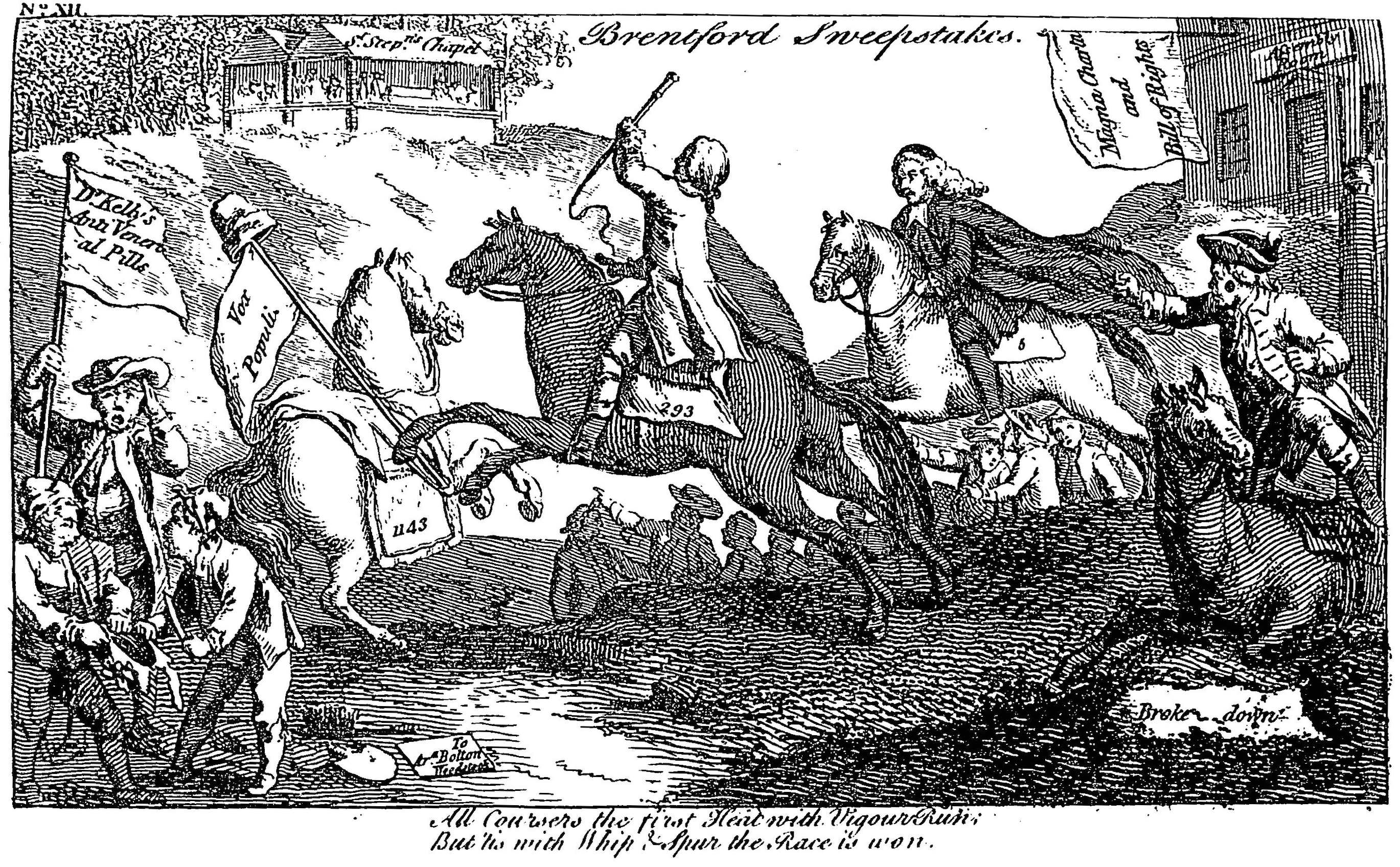
The Brentford Sweepstakes, drawing from Town and Country Magazine (13 April 1769) satirising the election. Wilkes' riderless horse labelled "1143" indicating he got a majority of the vote, while his opponents founder.

Parliament expelled Wilkes in February 1769, on the grounds that he was an outlaw when returned. His Middlesex constituents re-elected him in the same month with the support of John Wheble, editor of the Middlesex Journal, only to see him expelled again and re-elected in March. In April, after his expulsion and another re-election, Parliament declared his opponent, Henry Luttrell, the winner.

Wilkes was said to hold his supporters in contempt during the election campaign. E. P. Thompson, in his celebrated 1963 text The Making of the English Working Class wrote: “‘Do you suppose’ it is said that he asked his opponent, Colonel Luttrell, while watching the cheering throngs on the hustings, ‘that there are more fools or rogues in that assembly?’”

In defiance, Wilkes became an Alderman of London in 1769, using his supporters' group, the Society for the Supporters of the Bill of Rights, for his campaign. Wilkes eventually succeeded in convincing Parliament to expunge the resolution barring him from sitting. While in Parliament, he condemned Government policy towards the American colonies. In addition, he introduced one of the earliest radical Bills to Parliament, although it failed to gain passage. On his release from prison in March 1770, Wilkes was appointed a sheriff in London, and in 1771 the law on publicity of the parliamentary discussions was voted in Parliament, of which Wilkes was a great defender and who authorised the literal reproduction of the interventions of the Parliament.

== Later life ==
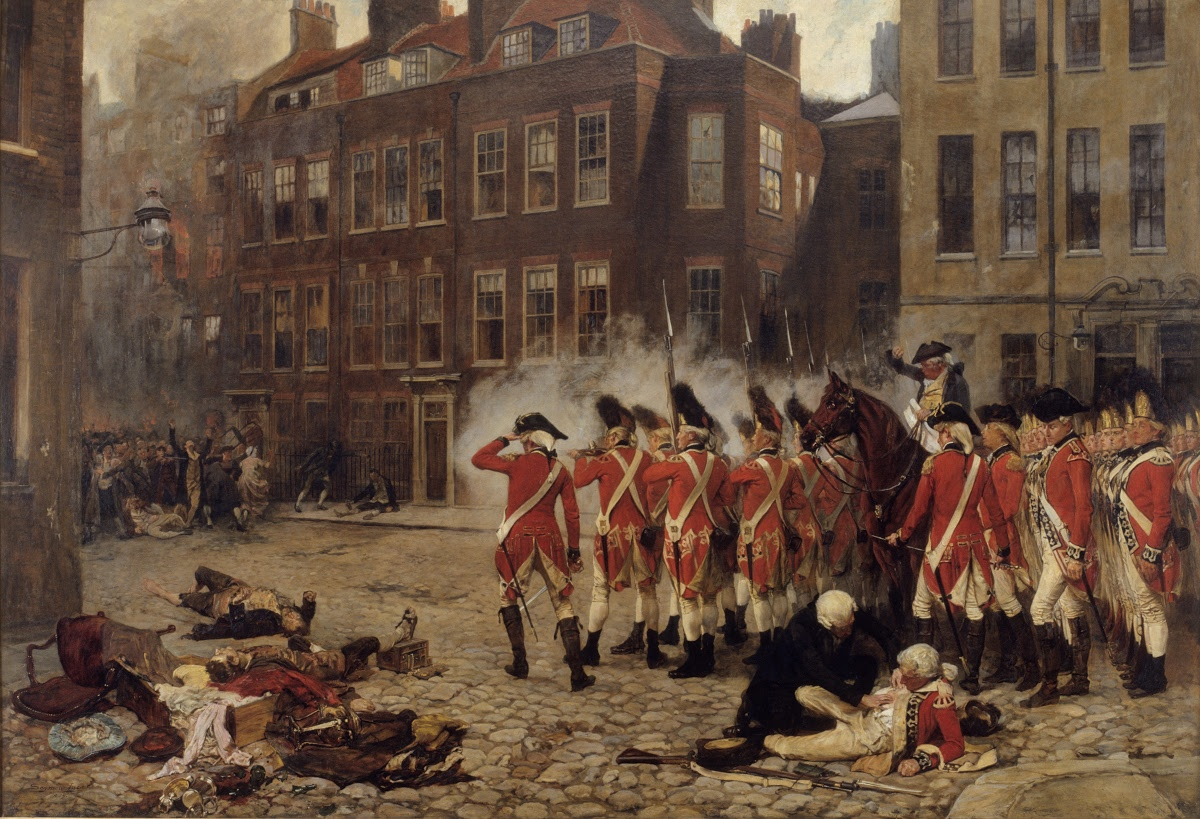
The Gordon Riots by John Seymour Lucas, 1879. Wilkes' popularity with radicals declined after he led militia to protect the Bank of England during the Gordon Riots in 1780. Wilkes became a supporter of William Pitt the Younger who became prime minister in 1783, and severed most of his former radical connections.

In 1774 he became Lord Mayor of London; he was simultaneously Master of the Joiners' Company, where he changed the motto from "God Grannte Us To Use Justice Withe Mercye" to "Join Loyalty and Liberty", a political slogan associated with Wilkes. That year Wilkes was re-elected to Parliament, again representing Middlesex. He was one of those opposed to war with the American colonies. He was also a supporter of the Association Movement and of religious tolerance. His key success was to protect the freedom of the press by gaining passage of a bill to remove the power of general warrants and to end Parliament's ability to punish political reports of debates. In 1779 he was elected to the position of Chamberlain of the City of London, a post of great responsibility which he was to hold until his death in 1797.

After 1780, his popularity declined as he was popularly perceived as less radical. During the uprising known as the Gordon Riots, the ex-militia officer Wilkes took charge of the soldiers defending the Bank of England from the attacking mobs. It was under his orders that troops fired into the crowds of rioters. The working classes who had previously seen Wilkes as a "man of the people", then criticised him as a hypocrite; his middle-class support was scared off by the violent action. The Gordon Riots nearly extinguished his popularity.

While he was returned for the county seat of Middlesex in 1784, he found so little support that by 1790, he withdrew early in the election. The French Revolution of 1789 had proved extremely divisive in England, and Wilkes had been against it due to the violent murders in France. His position was different from that of many radicals of the time and was a view more associated with conservative figures, including expressed indifference as to Catholic Emancipation. Edmund Burke, who had also supported American Independence, took a similar position.

Wilkes worked in his final years as a magistrate, campaigning for more moderate punishment for disobedient household servants.

Between 1788 and 1797 he occupied a property named "Villakin" in Sandown, Isle of Wight. The site is marked by a blue plaque.

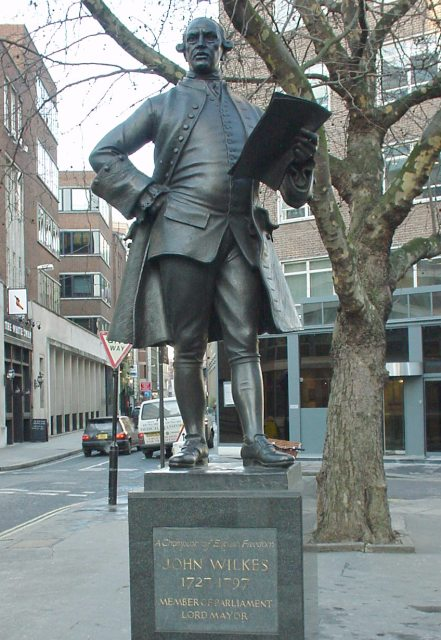
Statue of John Wilkes (Fetter Lane, London)

He was a member of the Oddfellows and today, a statue in his memory stands at Fetter Lane EC4.

Wilkes died at his home at 30 Grosvenor Square, Westminster, London on 26 December 1797. The cause of death was a wasting disease known at the time as marasmus. His body was buried in a vault in Grosvenor Chapel, South Audley Street, London on 4 January 1798.

== Anti-Scottish sentiment ==
Following Bute's appointment as Prime Minister in 1762, Wilkes founded the radical weekly newspaper The North Briton in deliberate opposition to the pro-government paper The Briton. From its inception, the publication adopted a stridently anti-Scots tone, portraying the growth of Scottish influence at court not as a feature of British integration after the Acts of Union 1707, but as a form of foreign intrusion. Wilkes and his allies characterised Scottish peers as impoverished opportunists and depicted the Scots more broadly as "ravenous wolves" and "leeches, sucking the blood of poor Englishman".

Wilkes’s hostility was closely bound to his broader opposition to ministerial corruption and perceived royal overreach. By exploiting anti-Jacobite sentiment, he suggested that Bute’s surname, Stuart, signified a latent loyalty to the deposed Jacobite line, framing Scottish influence as an "alien conspiracy" at the heart of government. He also tapped into economic anxieties following the Treaty of Paris (1763), arguing that a "Scotchman had no more right to preferment in England than a Hanoverian or a Hottentot.". The newspaper’s title itself served as a satirical jab at Scotland, while its pages frequently included dialect jokes and mocking references to kilts, bagpipes, and haggis. In collaboration with the poet Charles Churchill, Wilkes extended this rhetoric beyond journalism; Churchill’s poem The Prophecy of Famine (1763) caricatured Scotland as a barren, desolate wasteland, where "Earth, clad in russet, scorn'd the lively green" and no trees or flowers grow.

The campaign reached its climax in April 1763 with the publication of Issue No. 45 of The North Briton, which attacked the King’s speech which praised the Treaty of Paris ending the Seven Years' War as "the speech of the Minister" and not the King's own, reducing the monarch to a mouthpiece for the unpopular Bute. Even after Wilkes fled to France in late 1763 to avoid prosecution, London crowds treated him as a martyr to liberty, at times rescuing his works from public burning by the authorities.

In Scotland, however, Wilkes inspired what contemporaries described as "national detestation". Scottish periodicals such as the Weekly Magazine portrayed him as a bigot and a demagogue, and public demonstrations in Edinburgh featured the burning of his effigy at least a century after his death. Despite his public reputation as a virulent "Scotophobe", modern biographers and historians often characterise Wilkes’s rhetoric as a calculated political performance rather than a reflection of personal prejudice. Wilkes was a noted wit and socialite who maintained close, lifelong friendships with several Scots, most notably the biographer James Boswell, with whom he shared a famous bond of conviviality and debauchery. His attacks in The North Briton are increasingly viewed as a form of satirical entertainment and "political theatre" designed to mobilize the London mob against the Earl of Bute rather than a genuine expression of ethnic hatred. In a famous remark about his fellow MP for Middlesex, John Glynn, Wilkes reportedly said, "In fact, Sir, he was a Wilkite, which I never was", suggesting he did not personally subscribe to the extreme views of his own movement.

== Influence ==
Wilkes was at one point a hero to radicals in Britain and North America, and the slogan "Wilkes and Liberty" was heard on both sides of the Atlantic.

A radical contemporary Irish politician Charles Lucas, who sat for Dublin City in the Irish Parliament, was known as the "Irish Wilkes". The Dutch politician Joan van der Capellen tot den Pol (1741–1784), who supported the American Revolution and criticised the Stadtholder regime, was inspired by Wilkes.

Colonists in the Thirteen Colonies closely followed Wilkes's career. His struggles convinced many colonists that the British constitution was being subverted by a corrupt ministry, an idea that contributed to the coming of the American Revolution. Wilkes was widely admired in the American colonies as a political journalist, a radical politician, and a fighter for liberty. He greatly influenced the revolutionaries who fought for American independence and played a role in establishing the right to freedom of the press in the United States. In reaction, after the Revolution, representatives included provisions in the new American constitution to prevent Congress from rejecting any legally elected member and to proscribe general warrants for arrest.

John Wilkes's brother Israel Wilkes (1722–1805) was the grandfather of U.S. Naval Admiral Charles Wilkes.

== Eponyms ==
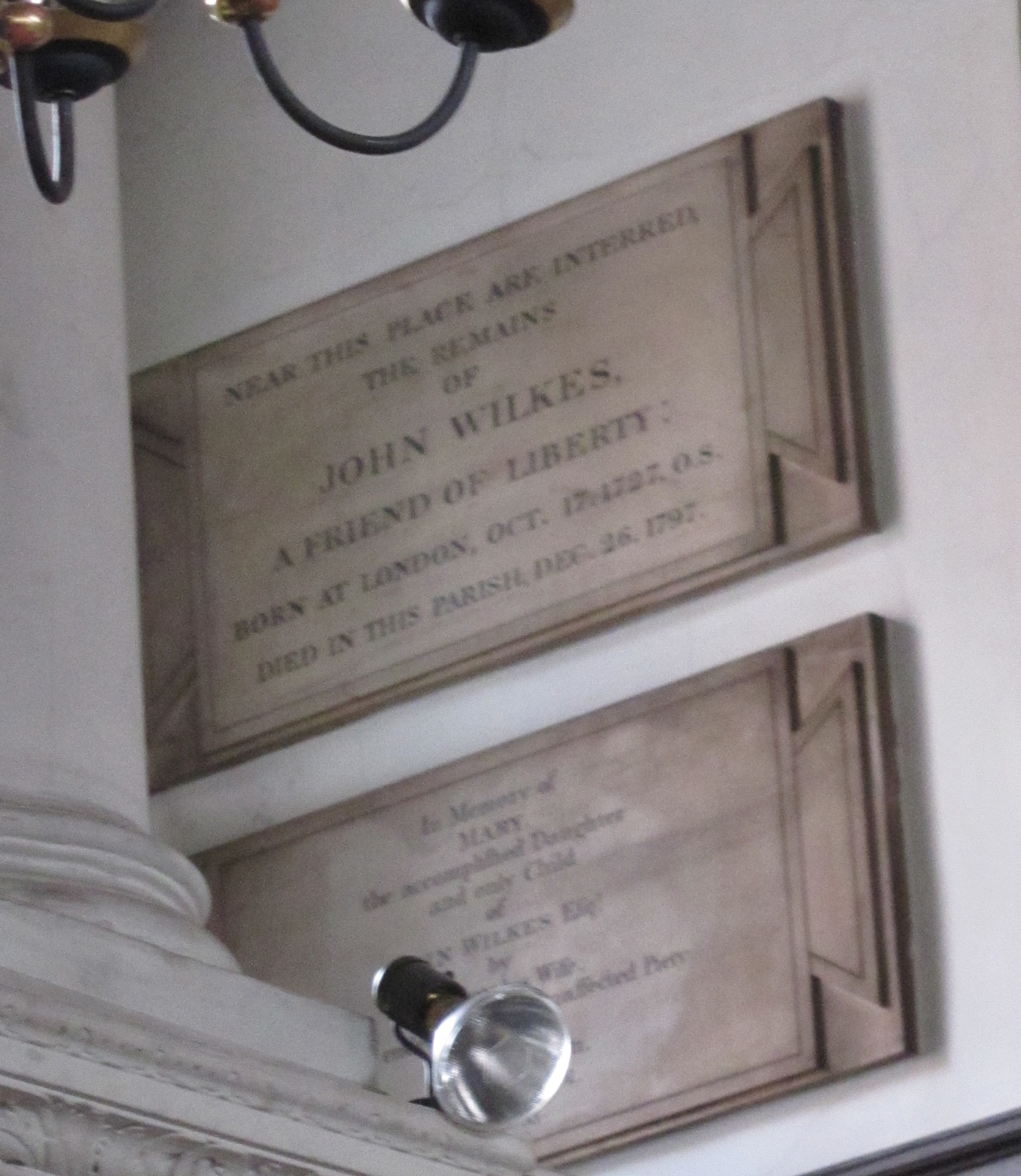
John Wilkes plaque in Grosvenor Chapel, London. The plaque beneath is to his daughter.

- John Wilkes – a passenger train of the Lehigh Valley Railroad that went to the City of Wilkes-Barre, which was named after John Wilkes.
- Wilkes-Barre, Pennsylvania – named for John Wilkes and Isaac Barré.
- Wilkes University, a private, non-denominational university located in Wilkes-Barre, Pennsylvania
- Wilkes Street in Spitalfields, London
- Wilkes County, Georgia and Wilkes County, North Carolina
- Wilkes Street in Alexandria, Virginia, U.S.
- Fox & Wilkes Books, the publishing arm of Laissez Faire Books
- American actor and assassin of President Abraham Lincoln, John Wilkes Booth (1838–1865), a distant relative
- The Wilkes Head (public house), Eastergate, West Sussex
- The Wilkes Head (public house), Leek, North Staffordshire
- The Three Johns (public house), Islington, London - named for John Wilkes, John Glynn and John Horne Tooke

== Offices and titles ==
Parliament of Great Britain
Preceded by Thomas Potter; John Willes	Member of Parliament for Aylesbury; 1757–1764; With: John Willes 1757–1761; Welbore Ellis 1761–1764	Succeeded by Welbore Ellis; Anthony Bacon
Preceded by Sir William Beauchamp-Proctor, Bt; George Cooke	Member of Parliament for Middlesex; 1768–1769; With: George Cooke 1768; John Glynn 1768–1769	Succeeded by John Glynn; Henry Luttrell
Preceded by John Glynn; Henry Luttrell	Member of Parliament for Middlesex; 1774–1790; With: John Glynn 1774–1779; Thomas Wood 1779–1780; George Byng 1780–1784; William Mainwaring 1784–1790	Succeeded by William Mainwaring; George Byng
Civic offices
Preceded by Charles Woodnoth, of Maid's Moreton	High Sheriff of Buckinghamshire; 1754–1755	Succeeded by Henry Uthwaite, of Lathbury
Preceded by William Baker; Joseph Martin	Sheriff of London; 1771–1772; With: Frederick Bull	Succeeded by Richard Oliver; Sir Watkin Lewes
Preceded by Frederick Bull	Lord Mayor of London; 1774–1775	Succeeded by John Sawbridge, MP
