= Watkin Lewes =

Welsh merchant and politician

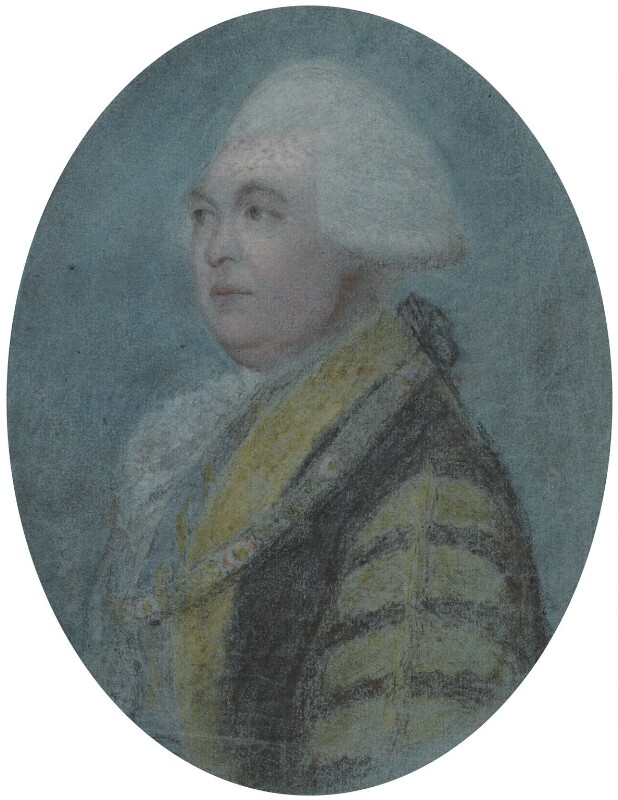
Portrait of Lewes after Daniel Dodd

Sir Watkin Lewes (c. 1740 – 13 July 1821) was a Welsh merchant and politician who served as Lord Mayor of London in 1780.

Lewes was the second son of Reverend Watkin Lewes, of Pen-y-Benglog, Melinau, and Ann Williams, of Treamlod (Ambleston), Pembrokeshire. He was educated at Shrewsbury School and at Magdalene College, Cambridge, from which he graduated in 1763. He was elected alderman for the London ward of Lime Street and Sheriff of London in 1772, and was knighted in 1773. In 1780 he was elected Lord Mayor of London.

In October 1781 he was elected at a by-election as one of the four Members of Parliament (MPs) for the City of London He served as an MP until his defeat at the 1796 general election. He stood again at the general election, in 1802, but was unsuccessful.

He took a keen interest in the history and literature of Wales and was elected the second president (Llywydd) of the Honourable Society of Cymmrodorion.

He died in a coffeehouse on Ludgate Hill, which was situated within the boundaries of the Fleet Prison where he had been imprisoned for debt.

Parliament of Great Britain
Preceded by George Hayley; Nathaniel Newnham; John Sawbridge; Frederick Bull	Member of Parliament for the City of London; 1781–1796; With: Frederick Bull to 1784; Nathaniel Newnham to 1790; John Sawbridge to 1795; Brook Watson 1784–93; William Curtis 1790–1818; John William Anderson 1793–1806; William Lushington 1795–1802	Succeeded by Harvey Christian Combe; William Curtis; John William Anderson; William Lushington
