= Barlow Trecothick =

London Merchant

Member of Parliament for the City of London
- In office 1768–1774
- Preceded by: Hon. Thomas Harley
- Succeeded by: Richard Oliver

Lord Mayor of London
- In office 1770–1770
- Preceded by: Sir William Beckford
- Succeeded by: Brass Crosby

Personal details
- Born: c. 1719
- Died: 28 May 1775 (aged 55–56)
- Spouses: Grizzel Apthorp (m. 1747; died 1769) Anne Meredith (m. 1770)
- Parent(s): Mark Trecothick; Hannah Greenleaf

Barlow Trecothick (c. 1719 – 28 May 1775) was a City of London merchant brought up in the colonial Province of Massachusetts Bay who became one of the Members of Parliament for the City of London and was Lord Mayor of London in 1770.

== Early life ==
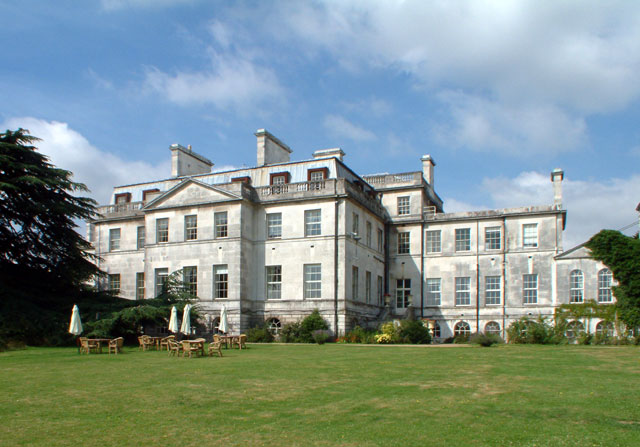
Addington Park, built for Trecothick

Trecothick was the son of a sea captain, Mark Trecothick, by his marriage to Hannah Greenleaf. His place of birth is uncertain, but it was probably either Stepney or else at sea. One biographer reports that he was born on 27 January 1720 in Stepney. His brother Edward Trecothick was baptized there in 1721.

From about 1724, the Trecothicks lived in Boston, Massachusetts Bay, where in 1734 the young Trecothick was apprenticed to Charles Apthorp, an enormously rich English-born merchant and slave trader of Boston, serving him until 1740, and then becoming a merchant.

== Career ==
In his evidence to a parliamentary committee in England in 1766, Trecothick said he had lived at Boston between the ages of seven and twenty-two, was then in Jamaica for seven years, returned to New England for three years, and finally settled in London. His sister Hannah was born at Boston on 2 December 1724.

After marrying in 1747, Trecothick and his wife moved to London, where they settled around 1750, and he continued trading as a merchant, through a company called Trecothick, Apthorp, and Thomlinson, becoming a member of the Worshipful Company of Clothworkers.

Trecothick made a large fortune and became an alderman of the Corporation of London. In 1768 he bought the manor of Addington, in Surrey, for £38,500,equivalent to £6,070,000 in 2025, and began to build Addington Park, a new country house designed by Robert Mylne in the Palladian style, with single-storey wings.

He soon had an estate of some five thousand acres, and went on to sit as a Member of Parliament for the City of London between 1768 and 1774, also serving as Lord Mayor in 1770.

== Personal life ==
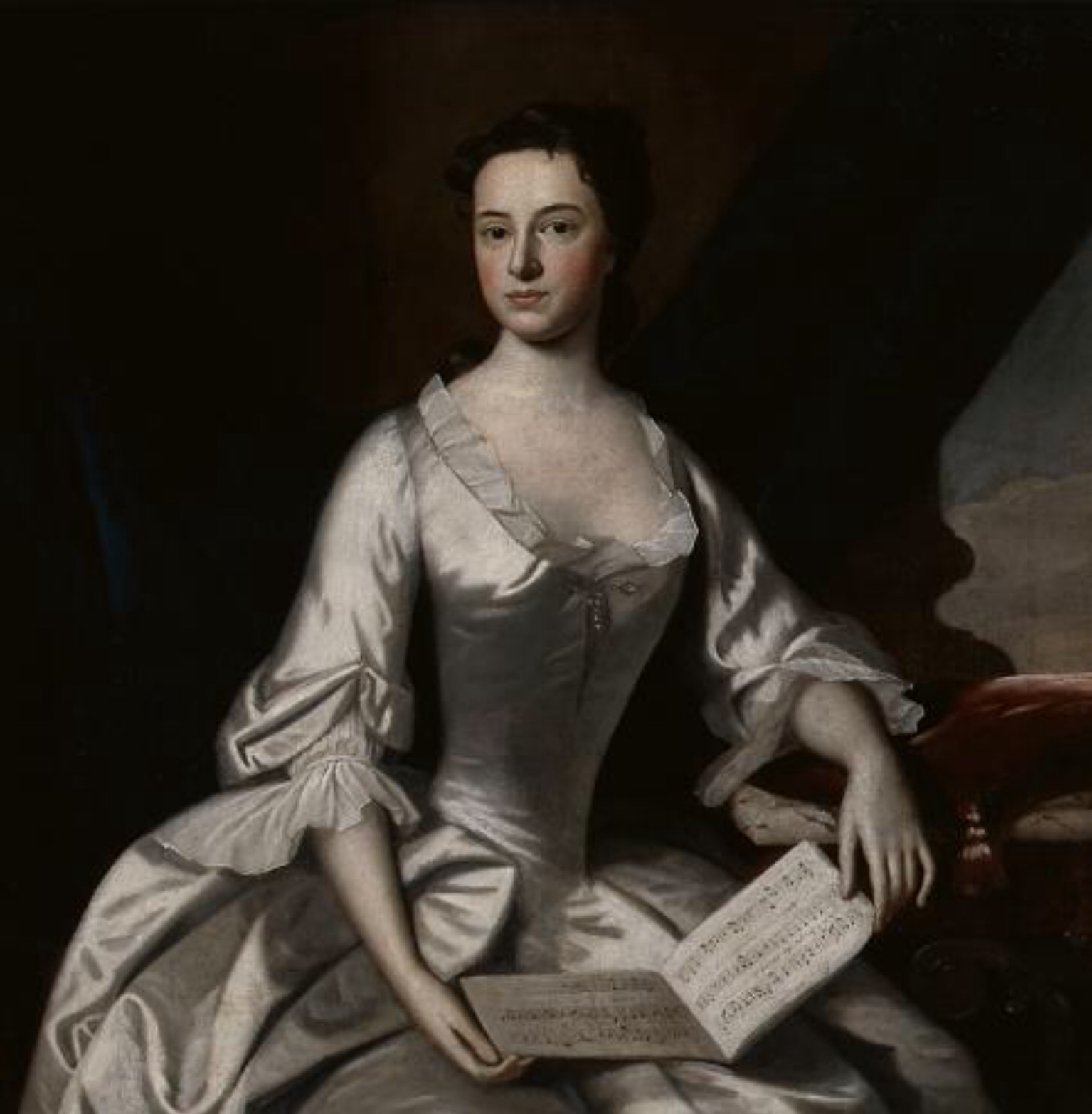
Trecothick's first wife, Grizzel Apthorp, painted by Robert Feke, c. 1748.

On 2 March 1747, Trecothick married Grizzel Apthorp, the eldest daughter of Charles Apthorp. His first wife died childless on 31 July 1769, and on 9 June 1770, Trecothick married secondly Anne, a daughter of Amos Meredith and a sister of Sir William Meredith, 3rd Baronet. There were also no children of this marriage.

Trecothick died on 28 May 1775, before his house at Addington was completed. He was interred at St Mary the Blessed Virgin Churchyard in Addington.

=== Legacy ===
His property and estate was inherited by his heir, a Harvard-educated nephew, James Ivers, the son of Trecothick's younger sister Hannah, who changed his name to Trecothick in the terms of his benefactor's will,.

Trecothick (formerly James Ivers) inherited ownership of over 500 enslaved people in Jamaica and Grenada from his uncle Barlow Trecothick.

Trecothic completed the house, but ran through his uncle's fortune and had to sell up in 1803. Charles Manners-Sutton purchased Addington Park, which became one of the palaces of the Archbishops of Canterbury and was renamed Addington Palace.

== See also ==
- Trecothick (ship) – one of two vessels named for Barlow or James Trecothick
