= Brass Crosby =

Politician in 18th century England

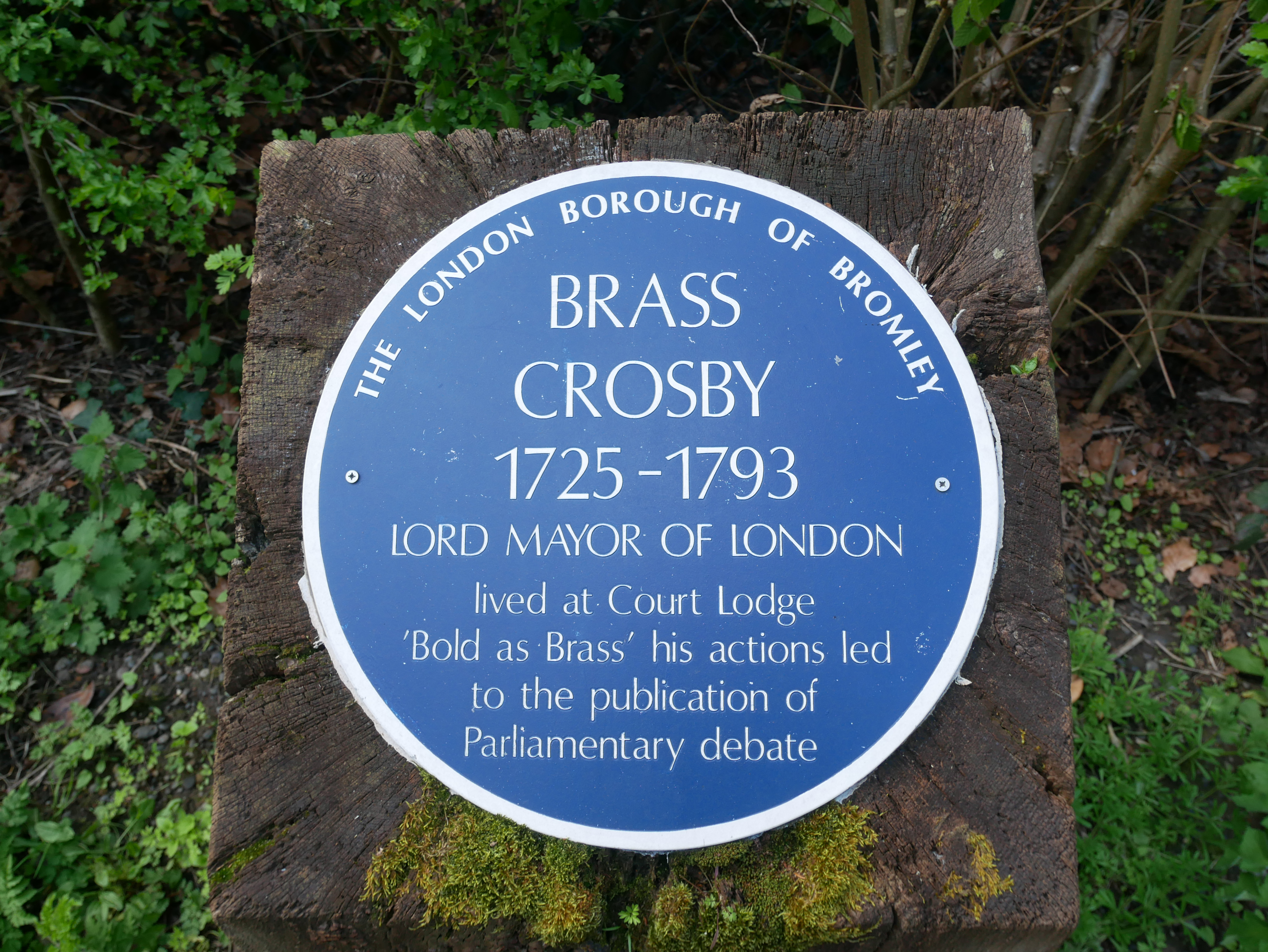
Blue plaque for Crosby in Chelsfield, southeast London

Brass Crosby (8 May 1725 – 1793) was an English radical lawyer, Member of Parliament and Lord Mayor of London.

== Life ==
Brass Crosby was born in 1725 the son of Hercules Crosby, a respectable burgess of Stockton-on-Tees and his wife Mary Brass. He qualified in law and came to London to practise his chosen profession. In 1758 he was elected to the City Council and elected 'lay' Sheriff in 1764. In 1765 Crosby was elected an Alderman and in 1768 he was elected as Member of Parliament for Honiton. In 1770 he was elected Lord Mayor of London. Crosby was a supporter of radical politician John Wilkes. In February 1772 he married Mrs Mary Tattersall.

As Lord Mayor (and therefore chief magistrate for the City), one of his first acts was to refuse to enforce Admiralty warrants to press gang Londoners into the Royal Navy, and he ordered constables to be positioned "at all avenues" of the City to prevent the seizure of men.

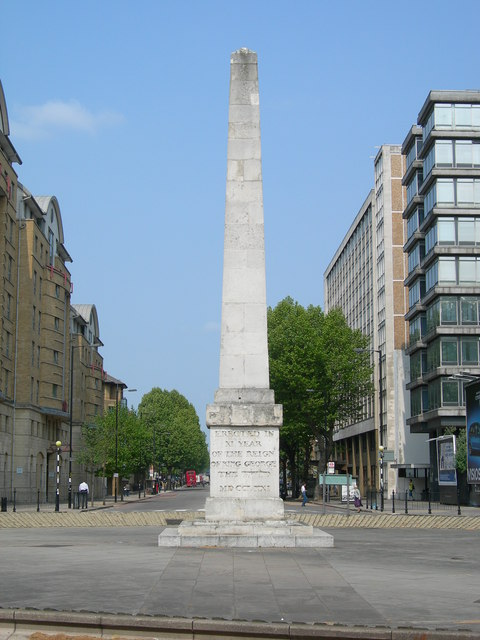
St George's Circus obelisk, Southwark

Crosby engaged in a famous battle with the House of Commons over publishing Parliamentary debates. In 1771 he had brought before him a printer who dared publish reports of Parliamentary proceedings. He released the man but was subsequently ordered to appear before the House to explain his actions. Crosby was committed to the Tower of London, but when brought to trial several judges refused to hear the case and after protests from the public Crosby was released. No further attempts had ever been made to prevent the publication of Parliamentary debates, facilitating the emergence of Hansard, until May 2009 when Carter-Ruck, a law firm, attempted to stop The Guardian newspaper from reporting a question asked in the House by Paul Farrelly MP, or to report that it had received such an injunction. The outrage caused by this brought Brass Crosby's name to the public attention again. Crosby's actions are (probably mistakenly) reputed to be the inspiration for the phrase "bold as brass".

In July 1771, the newly constructed obelisk at St George's Circus in Southwark was given an additional inscription. Below the text: ONE MILE/ CCCL FEET/ FROM/ FLEET STREET was added THE RIGHT HONOURABLE/BRASS CROSBY ESQUIRE/ LORD MAYOR. For many years, this somewhat squashed inscription was the only public commemoration of Crosby. Around 1897 the obelisk was moved to Geraldine Mary Harmsworth Park on Lambeth Road. It was reinstated on the original site in 1998.

Crosby died in 1793 at his house in Chatham Place, Blackfriars Bridge, and was buried in St Martin's Church, Chelsfield, near Orpington, Kent, where a monument was erected to his memory. The London Borough of Bromley has now erected a blue plaque to Crosby outside his former home, Court Lodge, in Church Road, Chelsfield. He had married three times, each time to a well-to-do widow, the third of whom had brought him Chelsfield manor, but he left no surviving children.
