= The North Briton =

18th-century radical London newspaper

The North Briton was a radical newspaper published in 18th-century London. The North Briton also served as the pseudonym of the newspaper's author, used in advertisements, letters to other publications, and handbills.

Although written anonymously, The North Briton is closely associated with the name of John Wilkes. The newspaper is chiefly famous for issue number 45, the forty or so court cases spawned by that issue, and for the genesis of "45" as a popular slogan of liberty in the latter part of the 18th century. The paper was also known for its virulently anti-Scottish sentiment.

== History ==
=== 1762–63 ===
Issues number 1 (5 June 1762) to number 44 (2 April 1763) were published on consecutive Saturdays.

The newspaper was begun in response to The Briton, a pro-government paper started by Tobias Smollett. Only eight days after that newspaper began publication, the first issue of The North Briton came out. It then came out weekly until the resignation of the Bute government.

==== Issue 45 ====
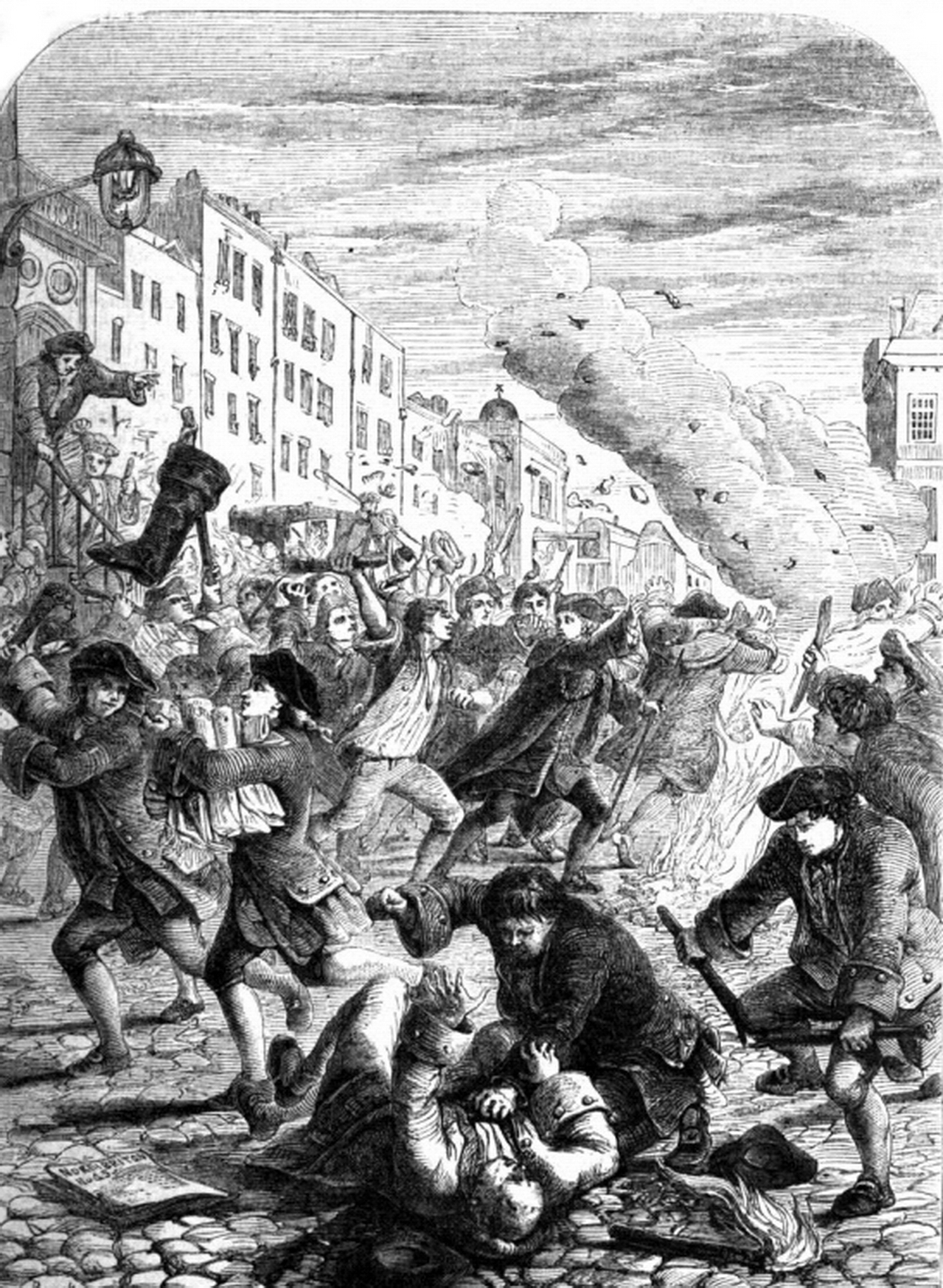
Riots in 1763 to stop the burning of issue No. 45 of The North Briton

The North Briton issue number 45 (23 April 1763) is the most famous issue of the paper. It criticized a royal speech in which King George III praised the Treaty of Paris ending the Seven Years' War. Wilkes was charged with libel (accusing the King of lying), and imprisoned for a short time in the Tower of London. Wilkes challenged the warrant for his arrest and seizure of his paper, eventually winning the case. His courtroom speeches started the "Wilkes and Liberty!" cry, a popular slogan for freedom of speech and resistance to power. Later that year, Wilkes reprinted the issue, which the government again seized. Before it could be burned, an assembled crowd rescued the text, and the ensuing events caused Wilkes to flee across the English Channel to France, and be eventually imprisoned again. In 1764, the British House of Commons declared Wilkes the author of number 45. Nonetheless, by the time Wilkes was released from prison in 1770, "45" was still a popular icon not only of Wilkes, but of freedom of speech in general.

=== 1768–71 ===
Issue numbers 47 (10 May 1768) to 218 (11 May 1771) were published by William Bingley.

Bingley was jailed in Newgate and then in King's Bench Prison on account of issues number 50 and 51. He was released after two years without trial.

== See also ==
- Entick v. Carrington
