= Nathaniel Newnham (junior) =

English politician

Nathaniel Newnham (c. 1741/1742 – 26 December 1809) was an English politician. He sat as MP for London from 1780 till 1790 and for Ludgershall from 27 June 1793 till 1796 and served as Lord Mayor of London from 1782 till 1783.

He also served as alderman of London from 1774 till his death in 1809, sheriff of London from 1775 till 1776, lieutenant colonel of the Honourable Artillery Company. from 1781 till 1794, president of St. Thomas's Hospital from 1782 till his death, colonel of the Orange regiment from 1783 till 1789, colonel of the 5th London Militia from 1789 till 1794, lieutenant colonel of the East London Militia from 1794 till 1796, colonel of the West London Militia from 1796 till his death, collector of orphans' coal duties from 1804 till his death, master of Mercers' Co. in 1786 and 1809, and director of Equitable Assurance in 1793.

He was the fourth son of Nathaniel Newnham and Sarah née Adams and the brother of George Lewis Newnham. He married Anne Whitelock and had two or three daughters.
