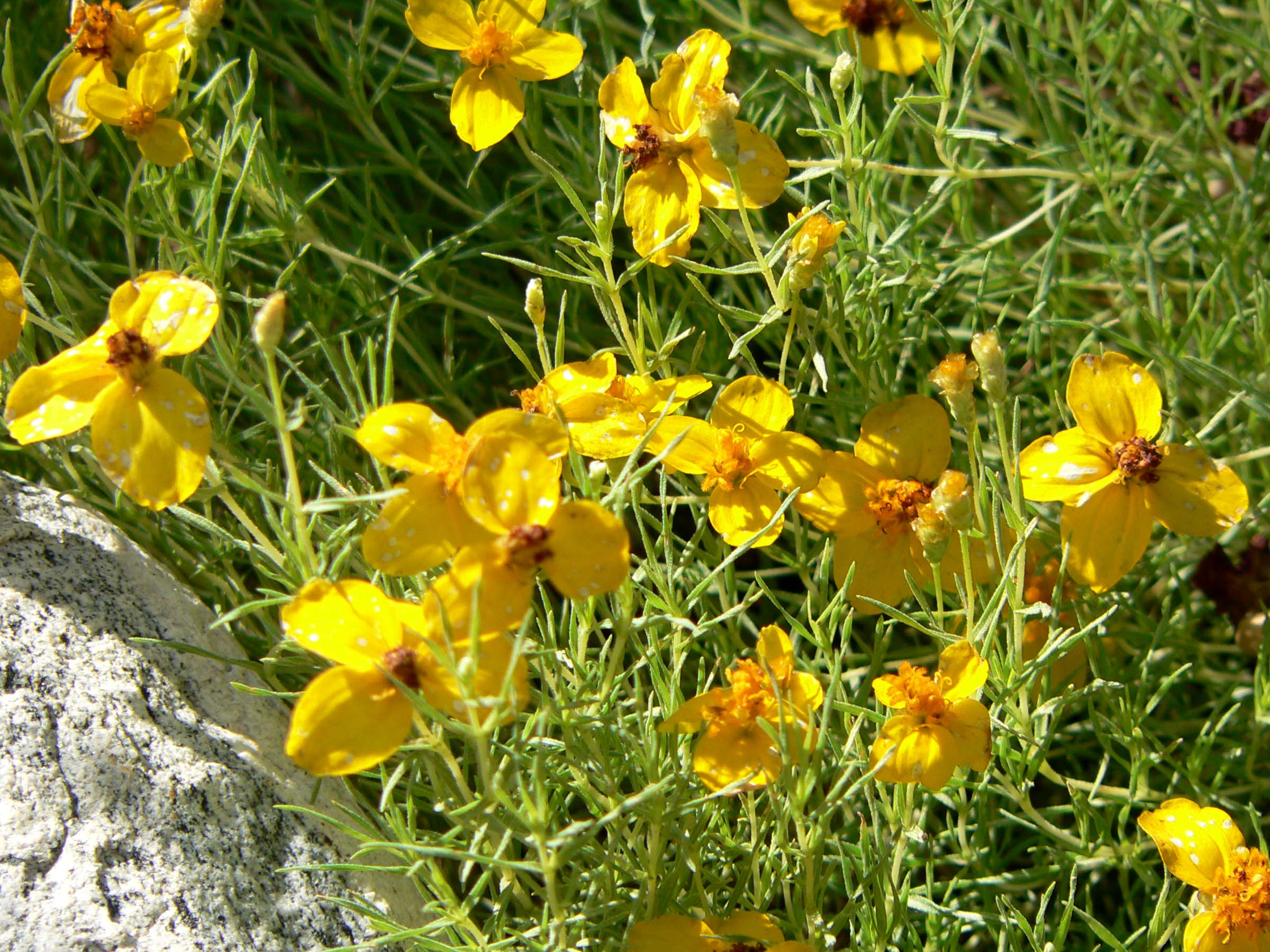

Conservation status
- Apparently Secure (NatureServe)

Scientific classification
- Kingdom: Plantae
- Clade: Embryophytes
- Clade: Tracheophytes
- Clade: Angiosperms
- Clade: Eudicots
- Clade: Asterids
- Order: Asterales
- Family: Asteraceae
- Tribe: Heliantheae
- Genus: Zinnia
- Species: Z. grandiflora

Binomial name
- Zinnia grandiflora Nutt. 1840

Synonyms
- Crassina grandiflora (Nutt.) Kuntze

= Zinnia grandiflora =

Species of flowering plant

Zinnia grandiflora is a species of flowering plant in the family Asteraceae known by the common names Rocky Mountain zinnia and plains zinnia. It produces a subshrub with yellow-orange flowers.

Native to the southwestern and south-central United States and northern Mexico, the species is used by many Native American tribes as traditional medicine as well as in paint and dyes.

== Description ==
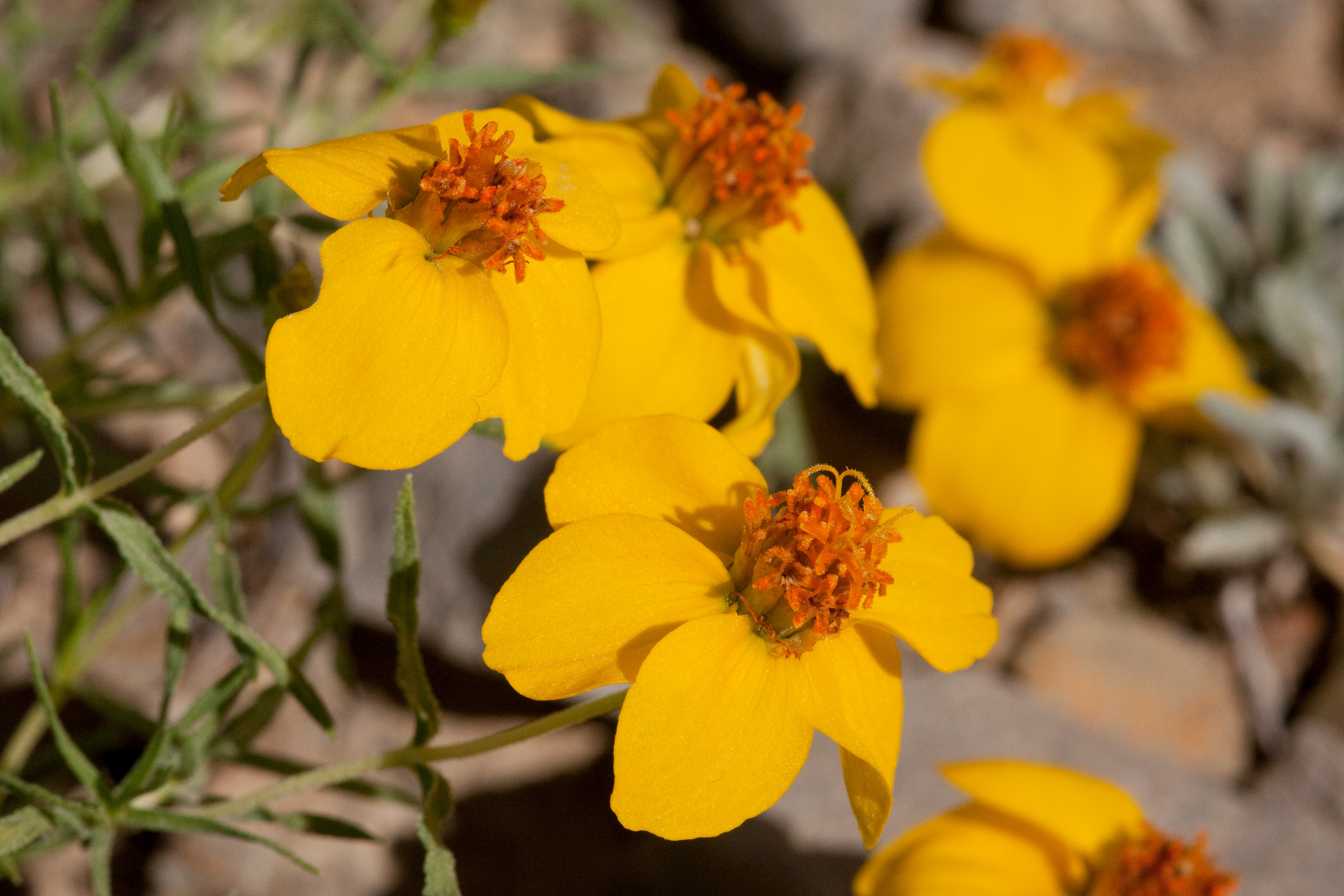
Flowers in New Mexico

Zinnia grandiflora is a small flat-topped or rounded subshrub growing up to 22.5 centimetres (9 in) tall with many short, woody stems. The leaves are oppositely arranged, up to 2.5 cm (1 in) long, and linear. The herbage is covered in short, rough hairs.

Blooming from June to October, the flower head is 2.5–4 cm (1–1 1/2 in) wide, with 3 to 6 roundish yellow-orange ray florets. At the center is a cluster of reddish or greenish disc florets.

=== Similar species ===
Zinnia acerosa is similar in the American Southwest and northern Mexico.

== Distribution and habitat ==
The species is native to the southwestern and south-central United States (Kansas, Oklahoma, Texas, Colorado, New Mexico, Arizona) and northern Mexico (Chihuahua, Coahuila, Sonora, Tamaulipas, Nuevo León, Zacatecas).

It grows on plains and foothills and other dry habitats. It blooms from around April through November. It grows best in the sun and with more dry soil. It is drought tolerant and cannot live in wet conditions. This plant works very well to help fight erosion due to its rhizomes, stems that grow horizontally to the ground, making them very sturdy.

They are also good for pollinators because they do not have any insect issues and will attract insects good for a garden such as butterflies.

== Uses ==
Zinnia grandiflora is used for many things from medicinal purposes to dyes and paint. They are non-toxic to pets.

This plant is used by several Native American groups, including the Zuni and Navajo, for medicinal and ceremonial purposes. Among the Zuni people, this plant is applied in a poultice to bruises, cold infusion of blossoms used as an eyewash, and smoke from powdered plant inhaled in sweatbath for fever.

The Acoma and Laguna Indians used Z. grandiflora to heal kidney illnesses by drinking an infusion. It was also used on buckskins to dye them yellow. By adding the flower to water or white clay it can also be used to color wool.

== Experiments ==
Zinnia grandiflora has also been used in a few experiments regarding irrigation and affects on mice. Texas AgriLife Research Center at El Paso, Texas A&M University System, used six species of wildflowers native to North America to test their tolerance of salt in their irrigation. The wildflowers were Salvia farinacea (mealy cup sage), Berlandiera lyrata (chocolate daisy), Ratibida columnaris (Mexican hat), Oenothera elata (Hooker's evening primrose), Z. grandiflora, and Monarda citriodora (lemon horsemint). They discovered that Z. grandiflora specimens had a very slow rate of growth and were all dead by the end of the experiment.

Another experiment was done on the effects of Z. grandiflora in mice, specifically using it as an anti-inflammatory and antiallodynic. Zinagrandinolide E (ZGE) was taken from Z. grandiflora plants and given to mice with either carrageenan-induced inflammation and tactile allodynia hyperglycemia. They found that ZGE was effective for treating the mice's inflammation pain.
