= Zinnia americana =

Scientific classification
- Kingdom: Plantae
- Clade: Embryophytes
- Clade: Tracheophytes
- Clade: Angiosperms
- Clade: Eudicots
- Clade: Asterids
- Order: Asterales
- Family: Asteraceae
- Tribe: Heliantheae
- Genus: Zinnia
- Species: Z. americana

Binomial name
- Zinnia americana (Mill.) Olorode & A.M.Torres

Synonyms
- Calendula americana Mill.; Tragoceros americanum (Mill.) S.F.Blake; Melampodium anomalum M.E.Jones; Tragoceros mocinianus A.Gray; Tragoceros schiedeanum Less.; Zinnia schiedeana (Less.) Olorode & A.M.Torres; Zinnia schiediana (Less.) Olorode & A.M.Torres

Species of flowering plant

Zinnia americana is a flowering plant that has a native range of Mexico to Nicaragua.
