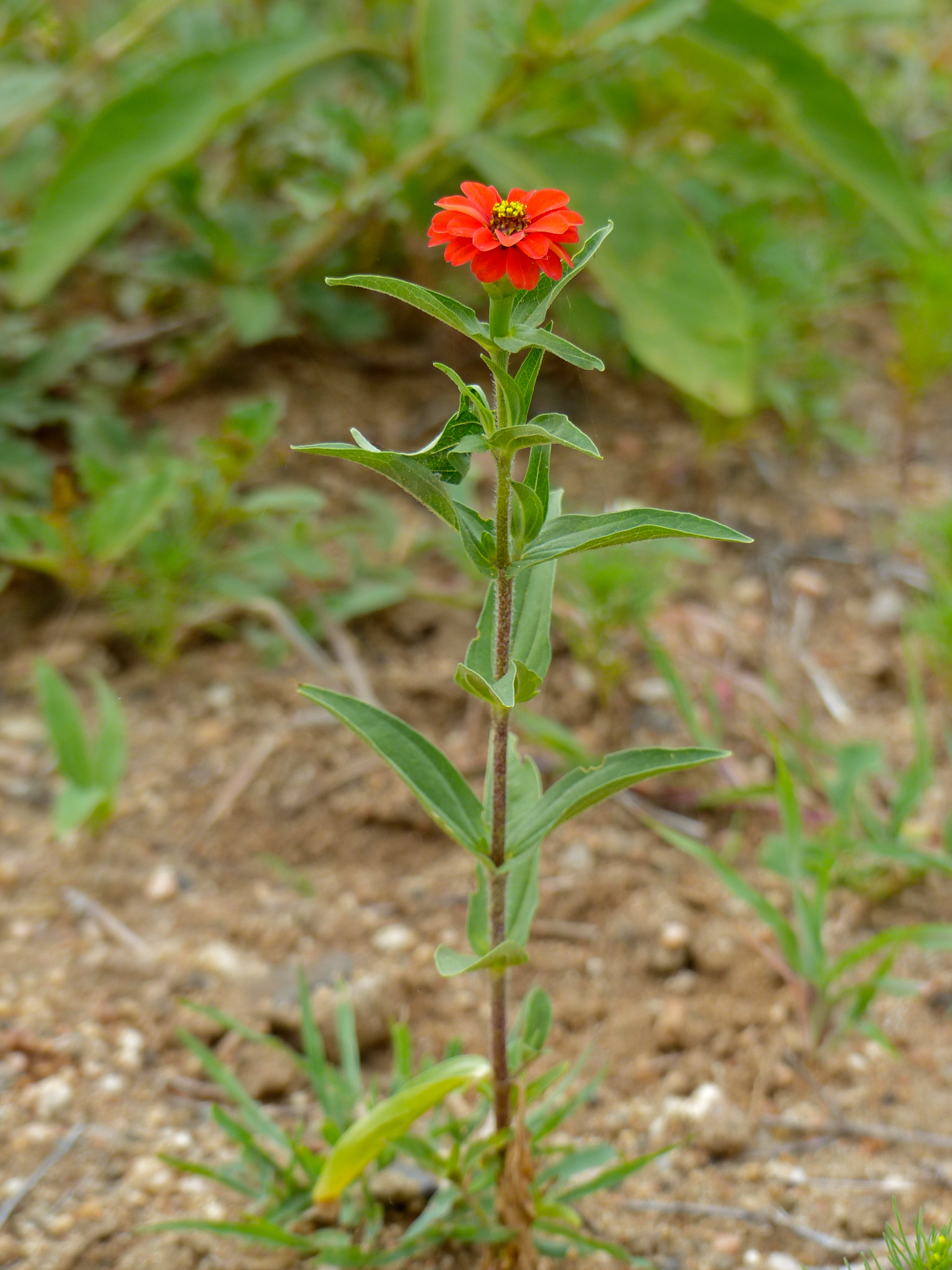

Scientific classification
- Kingdom: Plantae
- Clade: Embryophytes
- Clade: Tracheophytes
- Clade: Angiosperms
- Clade: Eudicots
- Clade: Asterids
- Order: Asterales
- Family: Asteraceae
- Tribe: Heliantheae
- Genus: Zinnia
- Species: Z. peruviana

Binomial name
- Zinnia peruviana (L.) L.

Synonyms
- Synonymy: Chrysogonum peruvianum L.; Crassina intermedia (Engelm.) Kuntze; Crassina leptopoda (DC.) Kuntze; Crassina multiflora (L.) Kuntze; Crassina peruviana (L.) Kuntze; Crassina tenuiflora (Jacq.) Kuntze; Crassina verticillata (Andrews) Kuntze; Lepia pauciflora (L.) Hill; Zinnia hybrida Roem. & Usteri; Zinnia intermedia Engelm.; Zinnia leptopoda DC.; Zinnia mendocina Phil.; Zinnia multiflora L.; Zinnia pauciflora L.; Zinnia revoluta Cav.; Zinnia tenuiflora Jacq.; Zinnia verticillata Andrews

= Zinnia peruviana =

Peruvian zinnia

Species of flowering plant in the daisy family

Zinnia peruviana, the Peruvian zinnia, is an annual flowering plant in the family Asteraceae. It is native to South America.

== Description ==
Zinnia peruviana is an annual plant up to 50 cm (20 in) tall, rarely 100 cm (39 in) tall. The stems are green, but later become yellow or purple. The leaves are ovate, elliptic or lanceolate, 2.5–7 cm long and 8–3.5 cm wide; 3- to 5-nerved. The peduncles are 1–7 cm long. Flower heads with 6–21 red, maroon or yellow ray florets (with a 0.8–2.5 cm long petal each) surrounding 12–50 yellow disc florets (with 0.1 cm long corolla lobes). Fruits (cypselae) oblanceolate to narrowly elliptic, 0.7–1 cm long, 3-angled or compressed, striate.

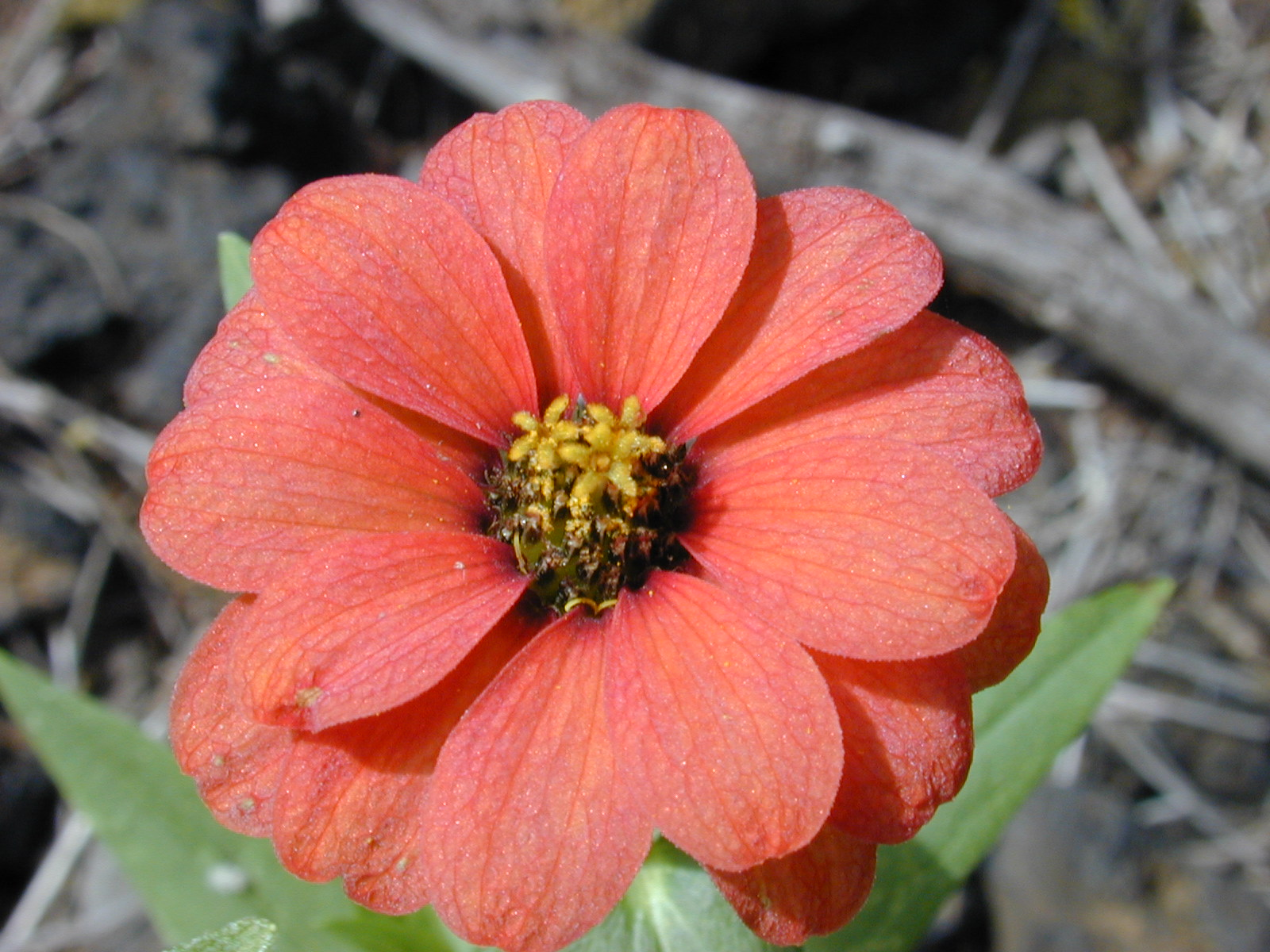
Close-up of flower head

== Distribution and habitat ==
The native range of Z. peruviana spans from southeastern Arizona and the Greater Antilles south to Argentina. It grows mostly on open areas or rocky slopes between 800–3,000 m (2,600–9,800 ft) of elevation.

It has been introduced to and naturalized in many places such as China, Pakistan, India, Bangladesh, Australia, South Africa and Hawaii.
