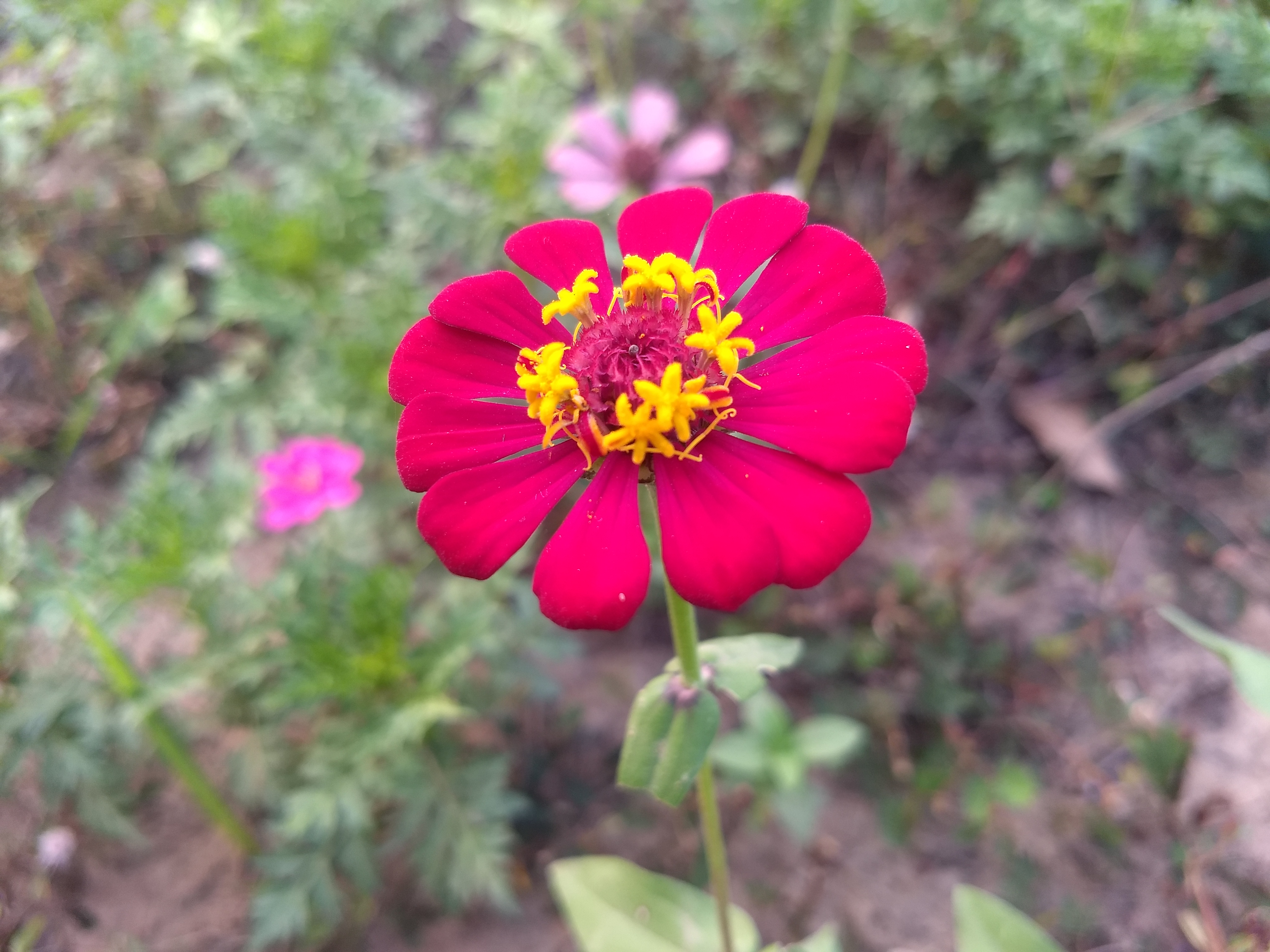
- Zinnia flower

Scientific classification
- Kingdom: Plantae
- Clade: Tracheophytes
- Clade: Angiosperms
- Clade: Eudicots
- Clade: Asterids
- Order: Asterales
- Family: Asteraceae
- Subfamily: Asteroideae
- Tribe: Heliantheae
- Subtribe: Zinniinae
- Genus: Zinnia; L.

Type species
- Zinnia peruviana L.

Synonyms
- Sanvitaliopsis Sch.Bip. ex Greenm.; Sanvitaliopsis Sch.Bip. ex Benth. & Hook.f.; Tragoceros Kunth; Lejica Hill ex DC.; Lepia Hill; Diplothrix DC.; Crassina Scepin

= Zinnia =

Genus of flowering plants

Stereo image
Left frame
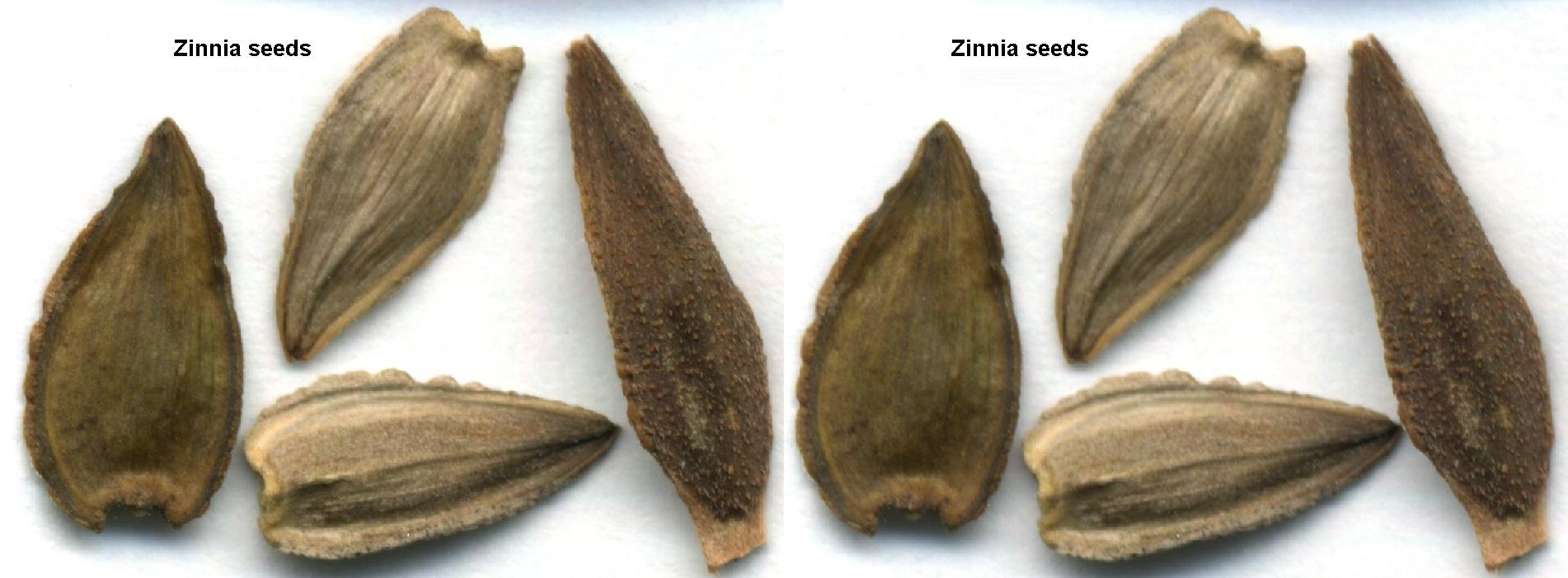
Right frame
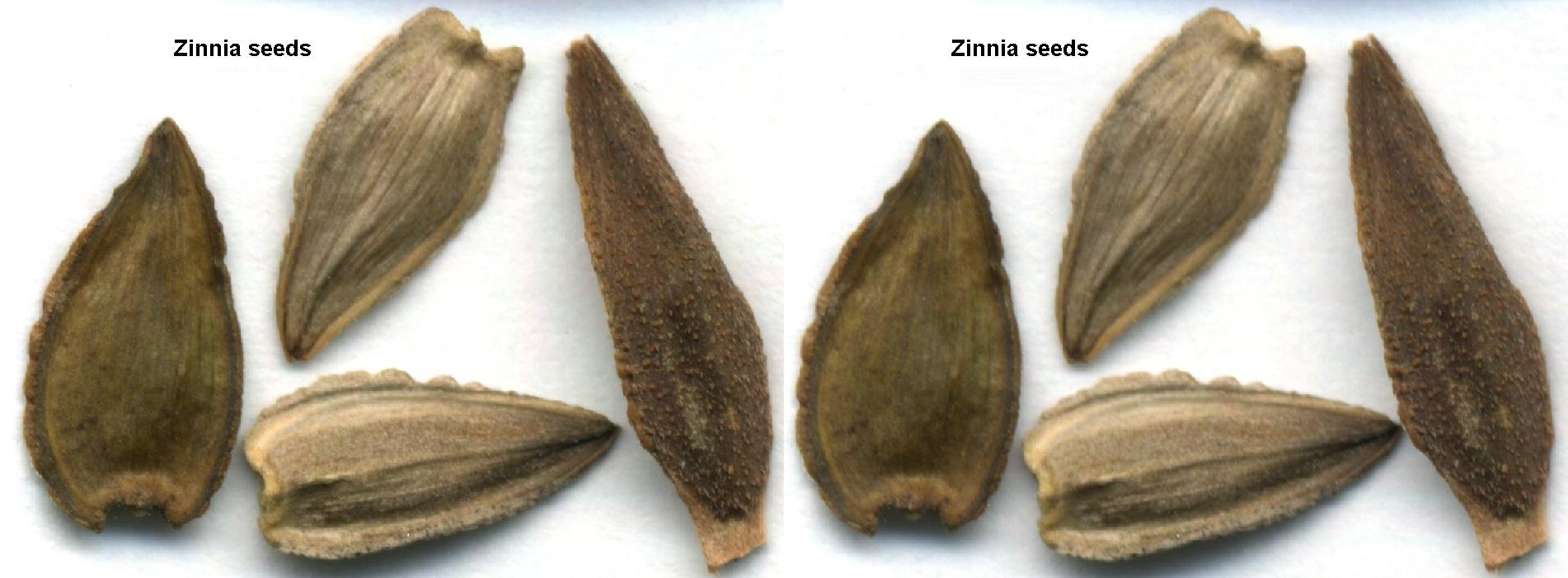
Parallel view
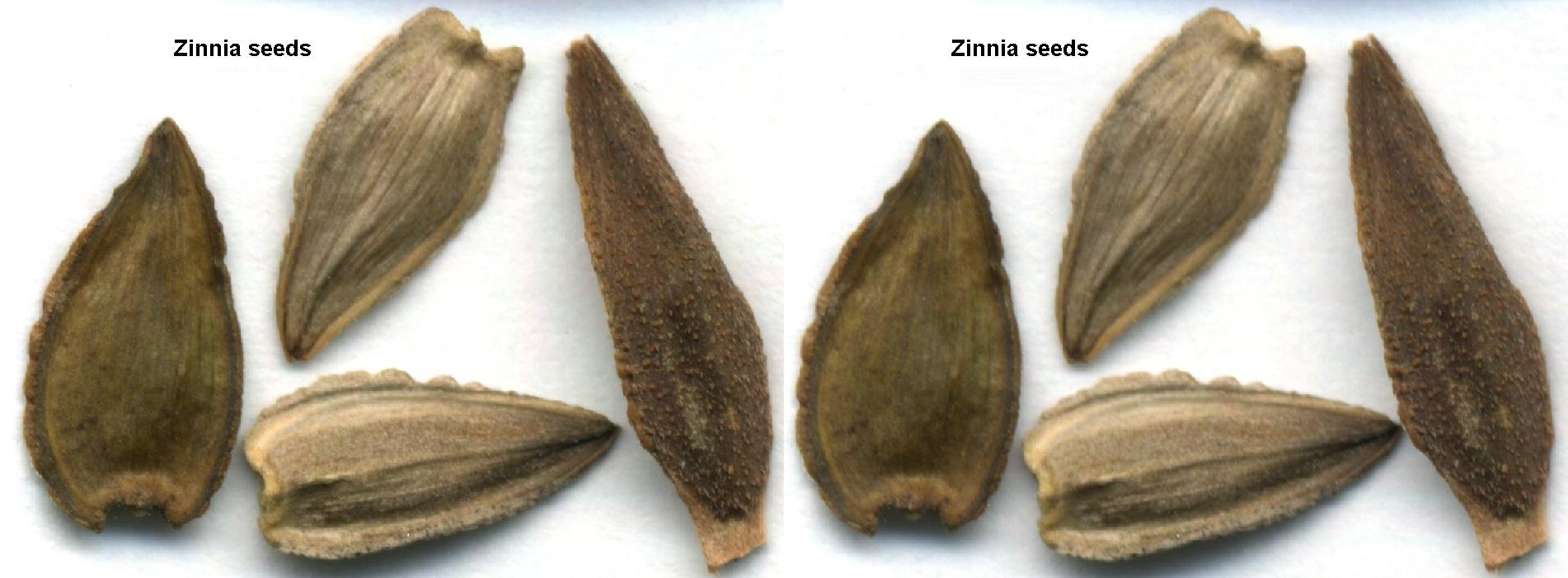
Cross-eye view
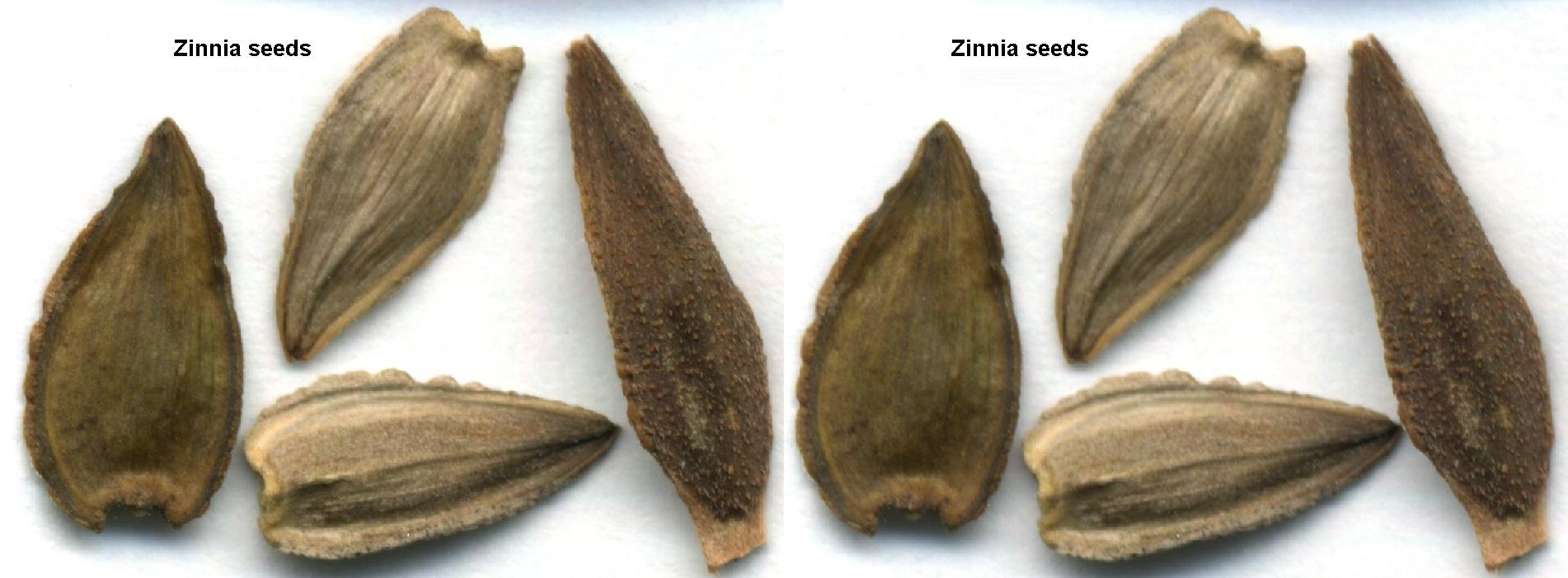

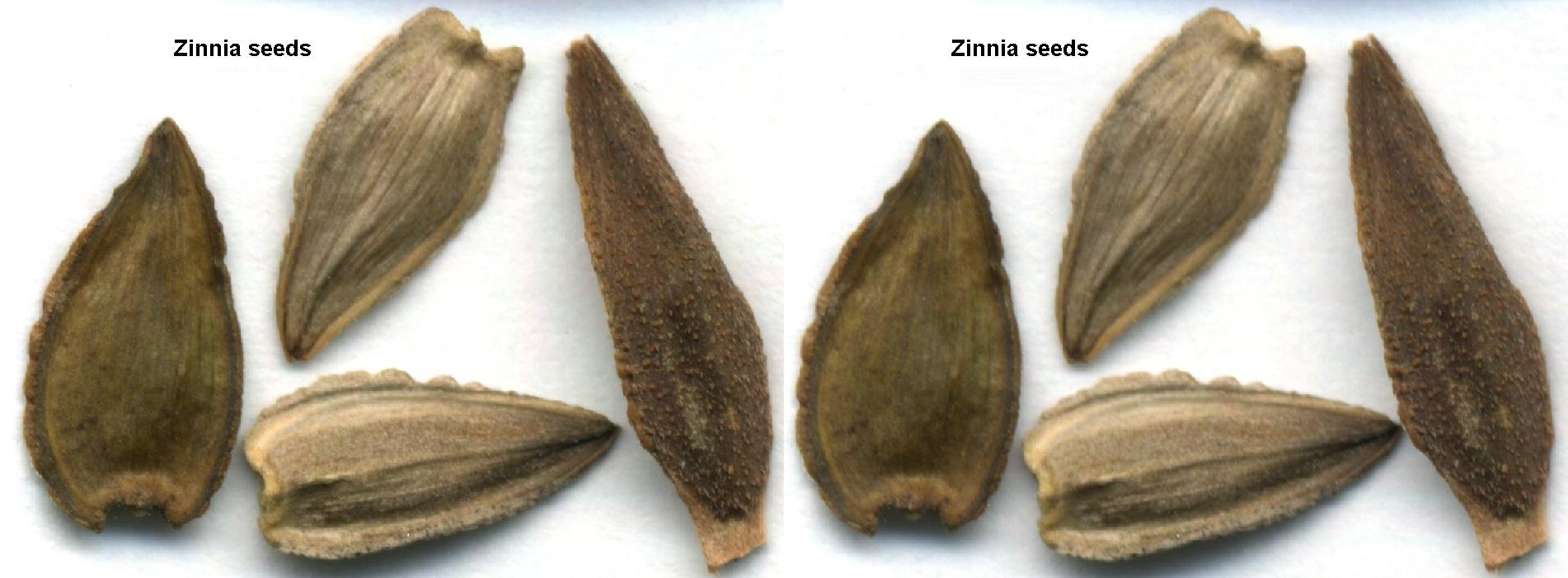
- Zinnia seeds resemble arrowheads

Zinnia is a genus of plants of the tribe Heliantheae within the family Asteraceae. Members of the genus are notable for their solitary long-stemmed 12-petal flowers that come in a variety of bright colors. The genus name honors 18th-century German scientist Johann Gottfried Zinn.

The genus is native to scrub and dry grassland in an area stretching from the Southwestern United States to South America, with a centre of diversity in Mexico.

== Description ==
Zinnias are annuals, shrubs, and sub-shrubs native primarily to North America, with a few species in South America. Most species have upright stems but some have a lax habit with spreading stems that mound over the surface of the ground. They typically range in height from 10 to 100 cm (4 to 39 in). The leaves are opposite and usually stalkless (sessile), with a shape ranging from linear to ovate, and a color ranging from pale to medium green. Zinnia's composite flowers consist of ray florets that surround disk florets, which may be a different color than the ray florets and mature from the periphery inward. The flowers have a range of appearances, from a single row of petals to a dome shape. Zinnias may be white, chartreuse, yellow, orange, red, purple, or lilac.

Each disc floret has five petals that enclose five stamens bearing anthers. When the petals open, the style elongates and pushes the pollen, produced by the anthers, upward where it becomes accessible to pollinator insects such as hoverflies that eat it. Nectar is secreted at the base of the floret, attracting long‑tongued bees and butterflies. As the style continues to grow, it divides into two branches, with the stigmatic surfaces at the tips maturing to receive pollen.

Time-lapse (200×) of Zinnia disc floret petals opening, their styles providing secondary pollen presentation. Visiting insects shown at normal speed. A thrips and two hoverflies eat the piled pollen. Two skipper butterflies reach the deep nectaries.

Time-lapse (200×) of a Zinnia disc floret with stigmas maturing after pollen release. Visiting insects: hoverflies, an immature insect, and skipper butterflies shown at normal speed. Closeup of style and stigmas shown during visits.

== Etymology ==
The genus name honors the German scientist Johann Gottfried Zinn (1727–1759), who collected Z. elegans seeds in Mexico.

== Cultivation ==
Zinnias are easy to grow with potential heavy, brightly colored blooms. Their petals can take different forms as single row with a visible center (single-flowered zinnia), numerous rows with a center that is not visible (double-flowered) and petals that are somewhere in-between with numerous rows but visible centers (semi-double-flowered zinnia). Their flowers can also take several shapes.

Zinnias are an annual plant usually grown in situ from seed. They dislike being transplanted due to having a fragile root system, but can be started indoors 4-6 weeks before planting and moved before their roots fully develop. Much like daisies, zinnias prefer to have full sunlight and adequate water. In the preferred conditions they will grow quickly but are sensitive to frost and therefore will die after the first frost of autumn. Zinnias benefit from deadheading to encourage further blooming.

== Species ==
Accepted species

- Zinnia acerosa (syn. pumila) – Arizona, New Mexico, Texas, and Utah in the United States; Coahuila, Durango, Michoacán, Nuevo León, San Luis Potosí, Sonora, and Zacatecas in Mexico.
- Zinnia americana – Chiapas, Guerrero, Honduras, Jalisco, Michoacán, México State, Nayarit, Nicaragua, Oaxaca, and Veracruz.
- Zinnia angustifolia – Chihuahua, Durango, Jalisco, San Luis Potosí, and Sinaloa.
- Zinnia anomala – Texas; Coahuila, and Nuevo León.
- Zinnia bicolor – Chihuahua, Durango, Guanajuato, Jalisco, Nayarit, and Sinaloa.
- Zinnia citrea – Chihuahua, Coahuila, and San Luis Potosí.
- Zinnia coahuilana – Coahuila.
- Zinnia elegans – from Jalisco to Paraguay; naturalized in parts of United States.
- Zinnia flavicoma – Guerrero, Jalisco, Michoacán, and Oaxaca.
- Zinnia grandiflora – Arizona, Colorado, Kansas, New Mexico, Oklahoma, and Texas; Chihuahua, Coahuila, Nuevo León, Sonora, and Tamaulipas.
- Zinnia guanajuatensis – Northeast Mexico.
- Zinnia haageana – Guanajuato, Jalisco, México State, Michoacán, and Oaxaca.
- Zinnia juniperifolia – Coahuila, Nuevo León, and Tamaulipas.
- Zinnia maritima (syn. palmeri) – Colima, Guerrero, Jalisco, Nayarit, and Sinaloa.
- Zinnia marylandica – Belize
- Zinnia microglossa – Guanajuato and Jalisco.
- Zinnia oligantha – Coahuila.
- Zinnia peruviana (syn. pauciflora) – widespread from Chihuahua to Paraguay including Galápagos and West Indies; naturalized in parts of China, South Africa, and the United States.
- Zinnia purpusii – Chiapas, Colima, Guerrero, Jalisco, and Puebla.
- Zinnia tenella – Durango.
- Zinnia tenuis – Chihuahua.
- Zinnia venusta – Guerrero.
- Zinnia zamudiana – Querétaro, Hidalgo.
- Zinnia zinnioides – Widespread in Mexico.

Formerly included

See Glossocardia and Philactis.

- Zinnia bidens – Glossocardia bidens
- Zinnia liebmannii – Philactis zinnioides

Zinnia elegans, also known as Zinnia violacea, is the most familiar species, originally from the warm regions of Mexico being a warm–hot climate plant. Its leaves are lance-shaped and sandpapery in texture, and height ranges from 15 cm (5.9 in) to 1 m (3 ft 3 in).

Zinnia angustifolia is another Mexican species. It has a low bushy plant habit, linear foliage, and more delicate flowers than Z. elegans – usually single, and in shades of yellow, orange or white. It is also more resistant to powdery mildew than Z. elegans, and hybrids between the two species have been raised which impart this resistance to plants intermediate in appearance between the two. The 'Profusion' cultivars, with both single and double-flowered components, are among the most well-known of this hybrid group.

Zinnias are favored by butterflies as well as hummingbirds, and many gardeners add zinnias specifically to attract them.

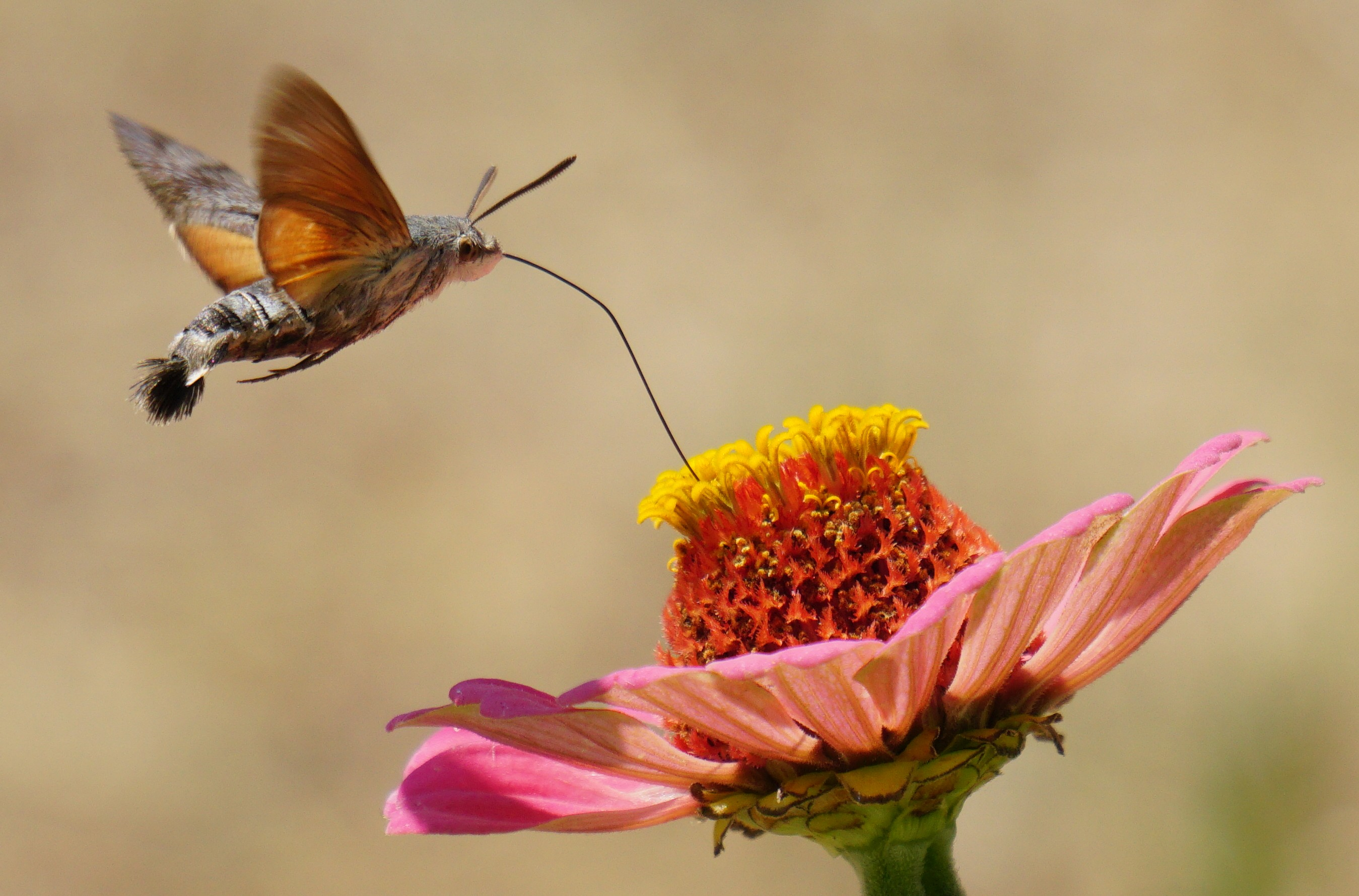
Hummingbird hawk-moth

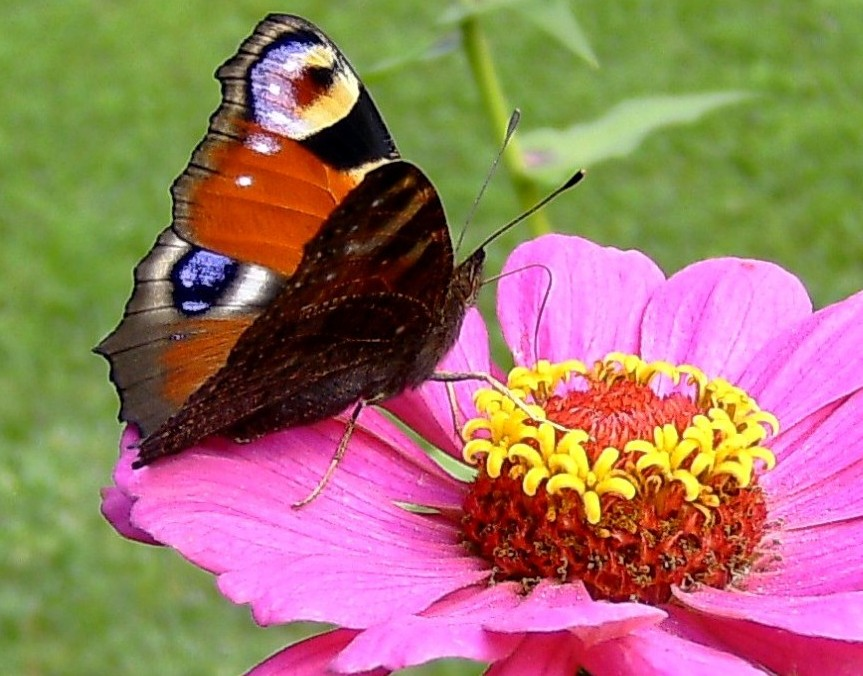
Aglais io

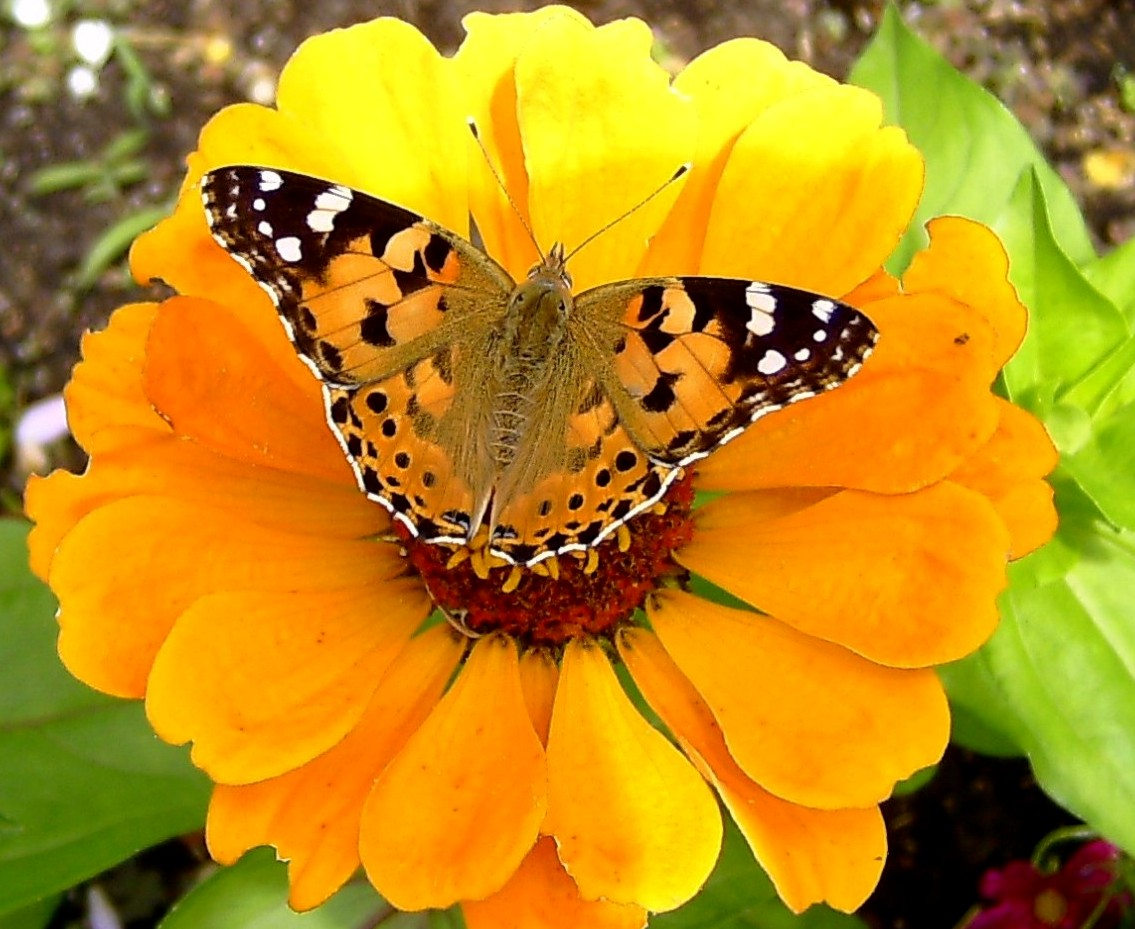
Vanessa cardui

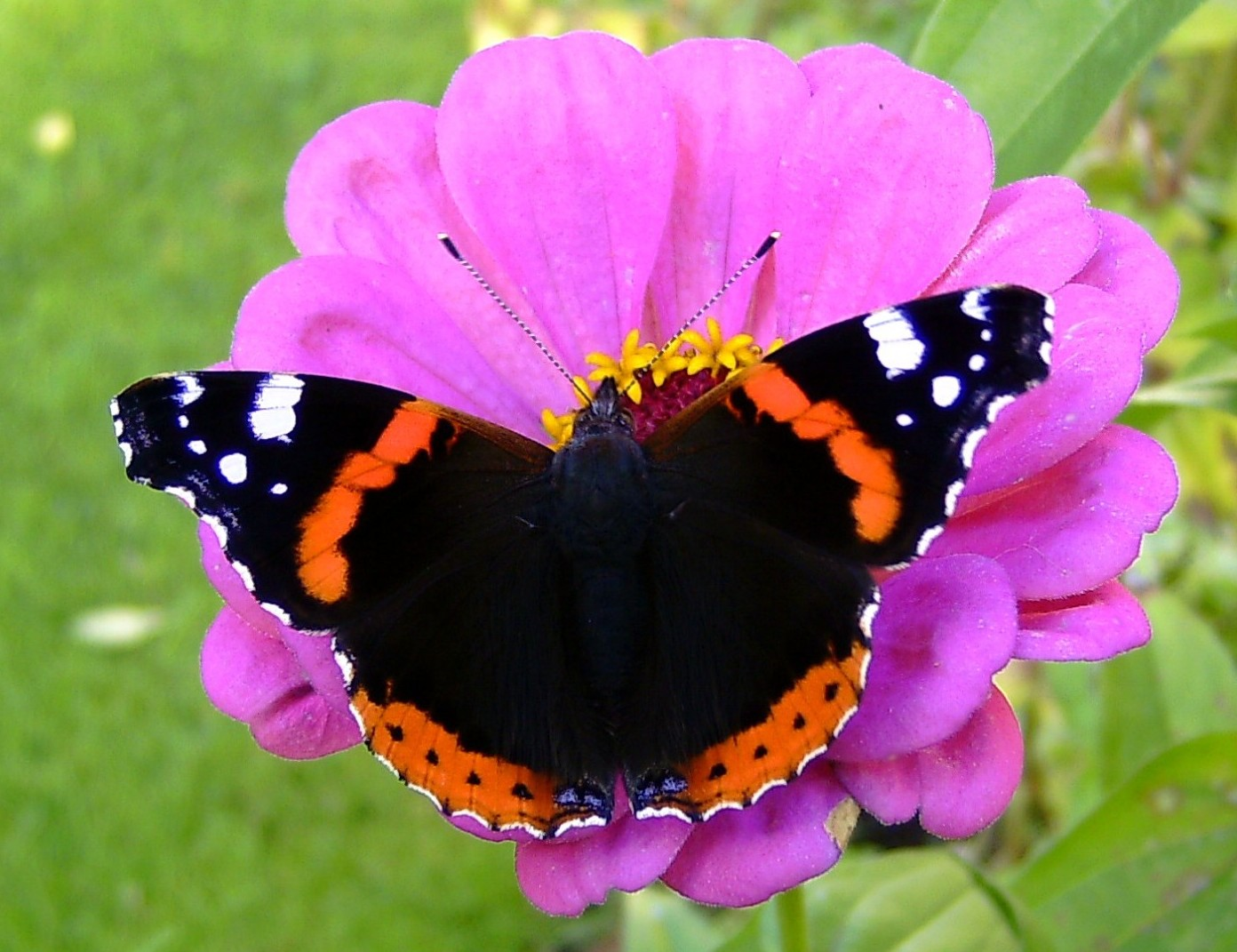
Vanessa atalanta

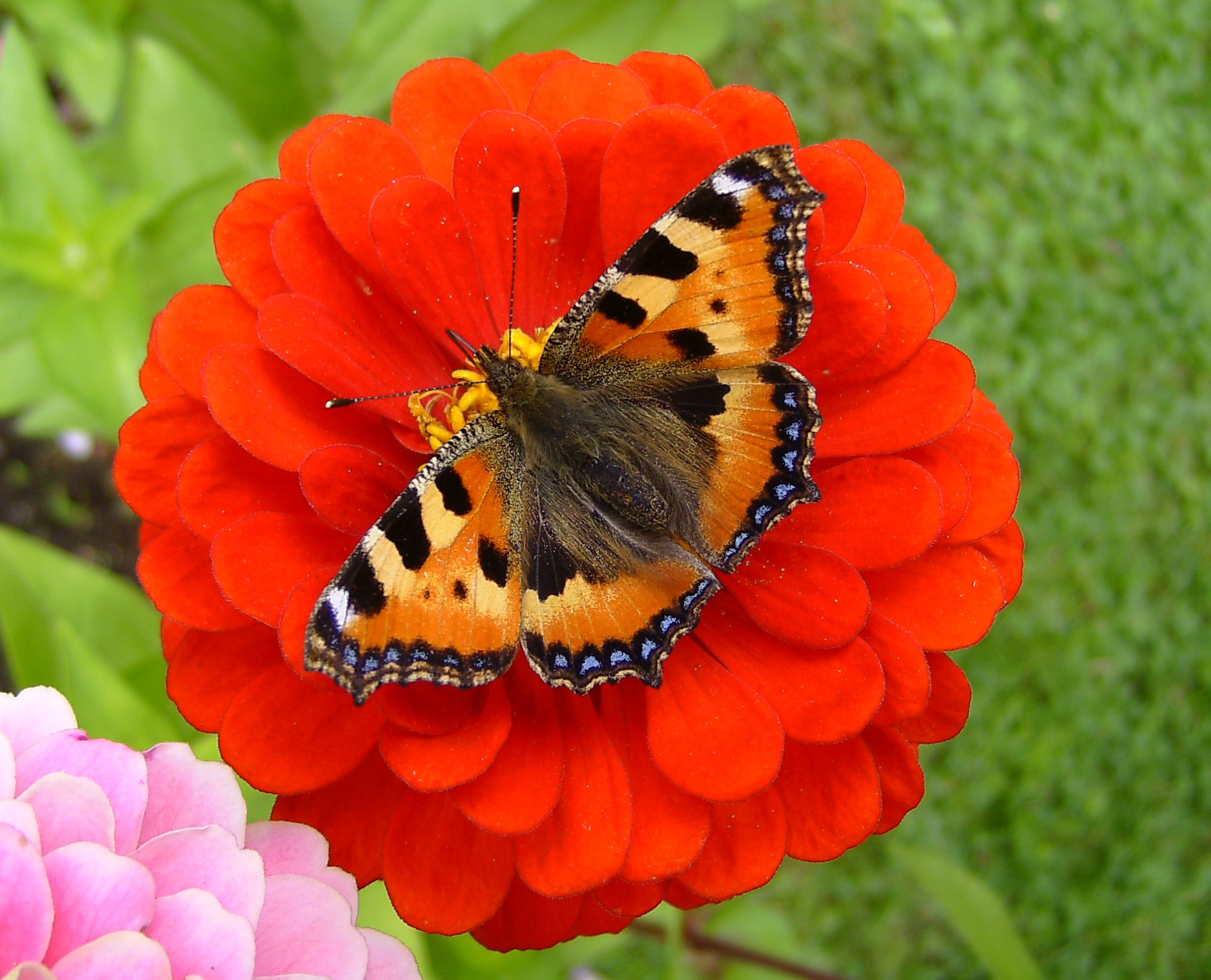
Aglais urticae

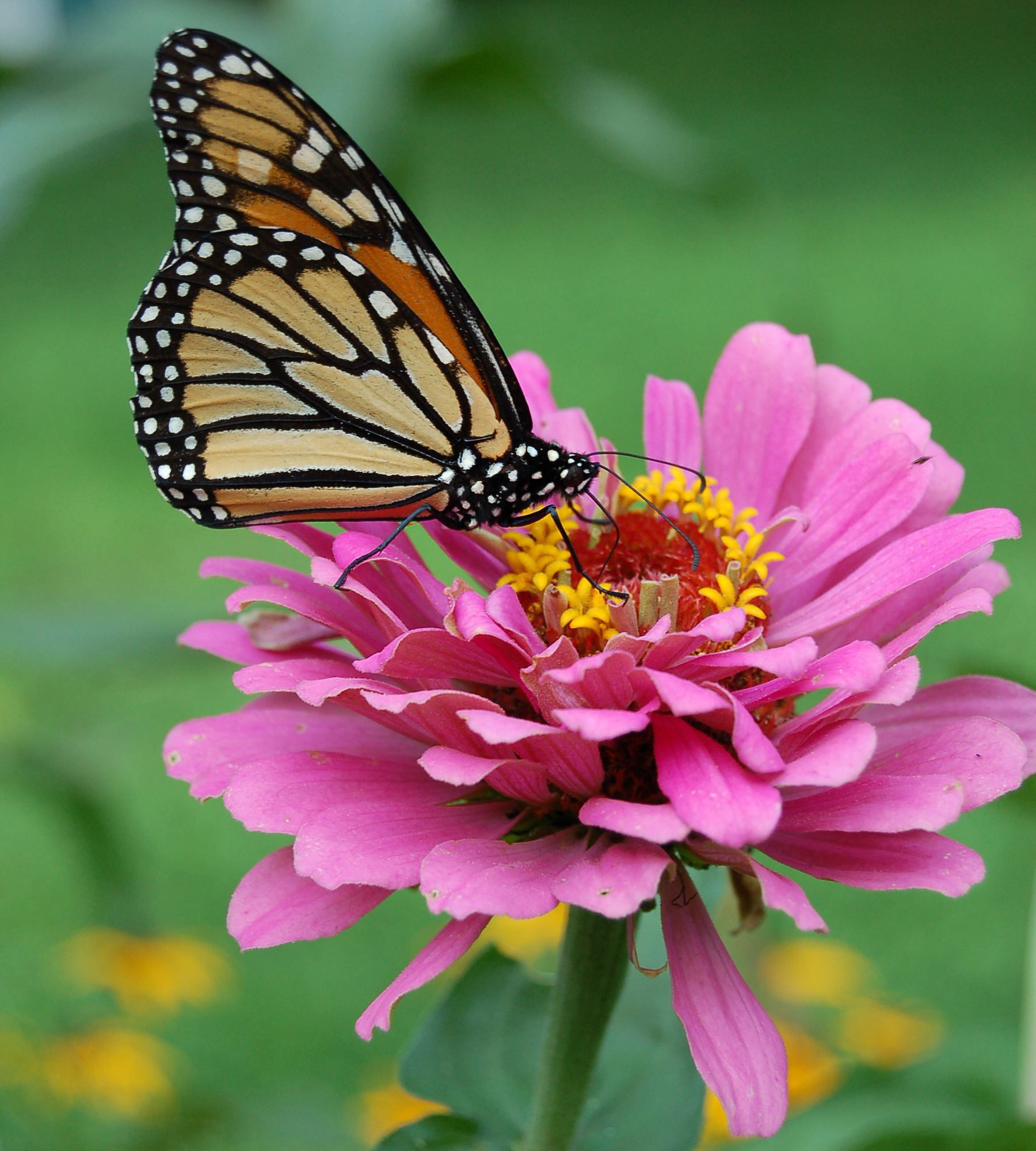
Monarch butterfly

== Uses ==
Zinnias are popular garden flowers because they come in a wide range of flower colors and shapes, and they can withstand hot summer temperatures and are easy to grow from seeds. They bloom all summer long. They are grown in fertile, humus-rich, and well-drained soil, in an area with full sun. They will reseed themselves each year. Over 100 cultivars have been produced since selective breeding started in the 19th century.

Zinnia peruviana was introduced to Europe in the early 1700s. Around 1790 Z. elegans (Zinnia violacea) was introduced. Those plants had a single row of ray florets, which were violet. In 1829, scarlet flowering plants were available under the name "Coccinea". Double flowering types were available in 1858, coming from India, and they were in a range of colors, including shades of reds, rose, purple, orange, buff, and rose striped. In time, they came to represent thinking of absent friends in the language of flowers.

A number of species of zinnia are popular flowering plants, and interspecific hybrids are becoming more common. Their varied habits allow for uses in several parts of a garden, and their tendency to attract butterflies and hummingbirds is seen as desirable. Commercially available seeds and plants are derived from open pollinated or F1 crosses, and the first commercial F1 hybrid dates from 1960.

Some zinnias are edible, though often reported to have a bitter taste best suited to garnish.

== Cultivation in microgravity ==
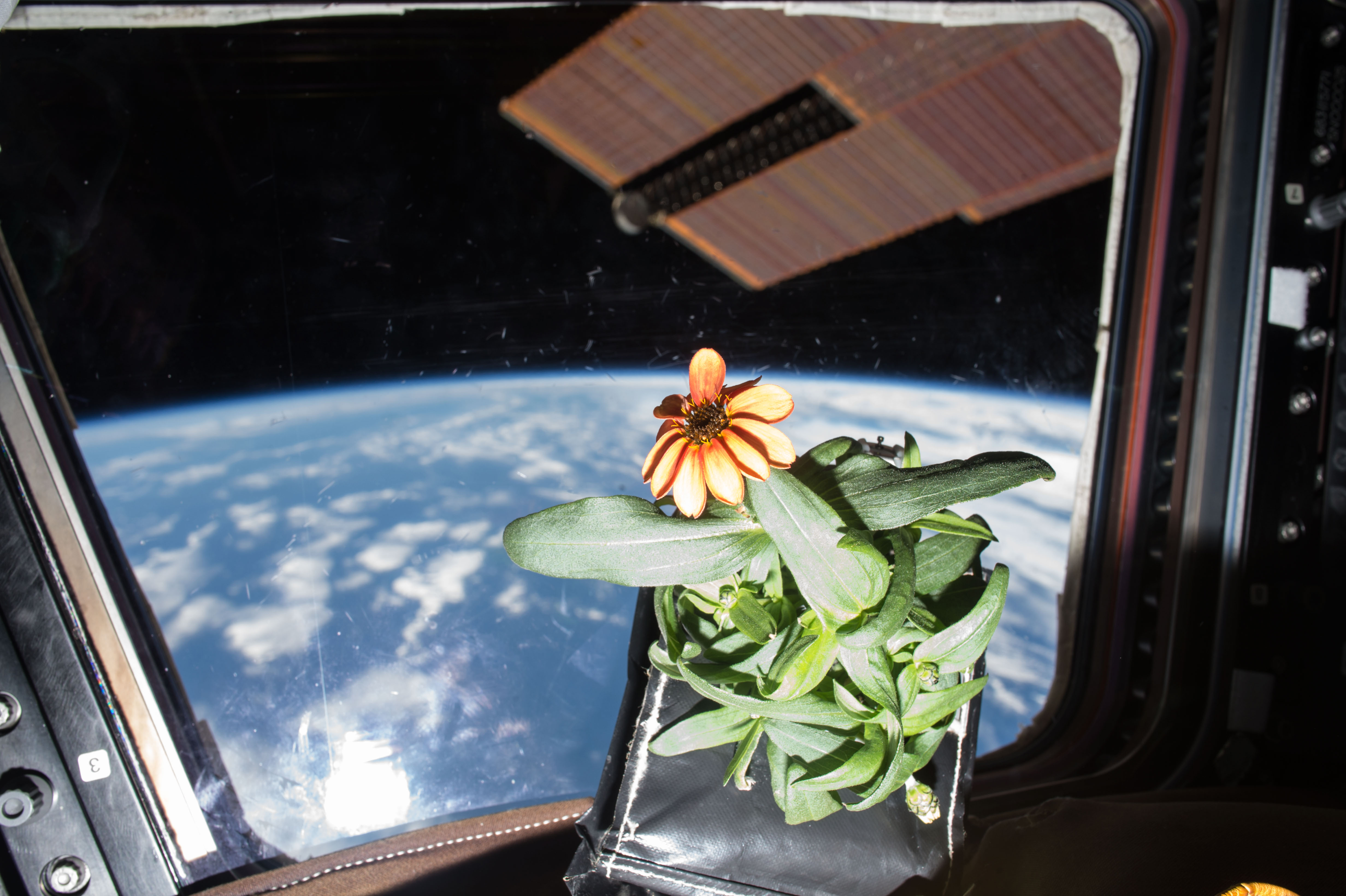
A zinnia flower blooming inside the cupola of the International Space Station, having germinated and grown in microgravity.

Zinnias were the first plants grown as part of a formal NASA experiment using the Veggie plant-growth system aboard the International Space Station, helping researchers study how more complex flowering crops could be cultivated in microgravity.

== Companion plants ==
In the Americas their ability to attract hummingbirds is also seen as useful as a defense against whiteflies, and therefore zinnias are a desirable companion plant, benefiting plants that are inter-cropped with it.

== Gallery ==
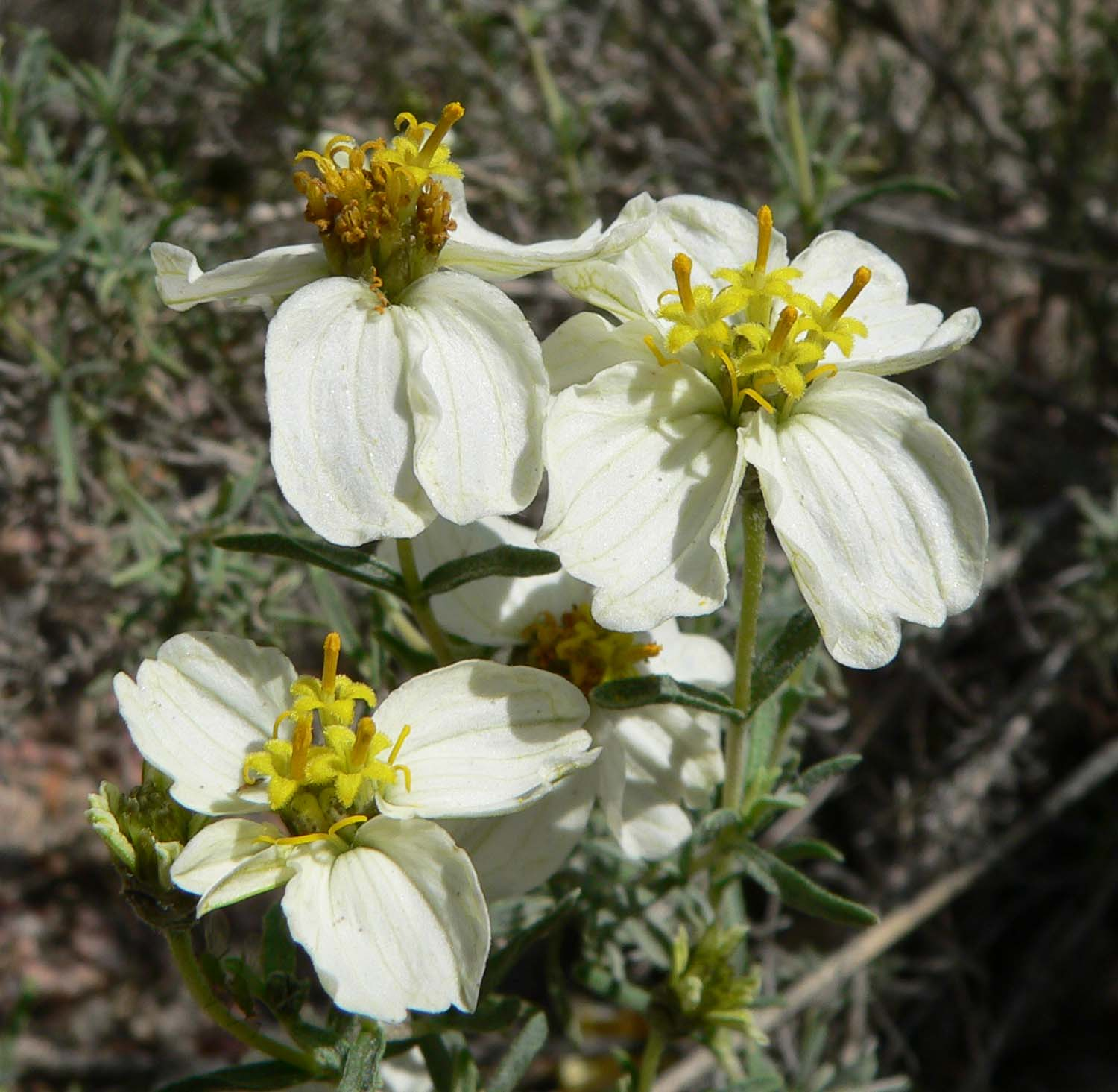
Zinnia acerosa

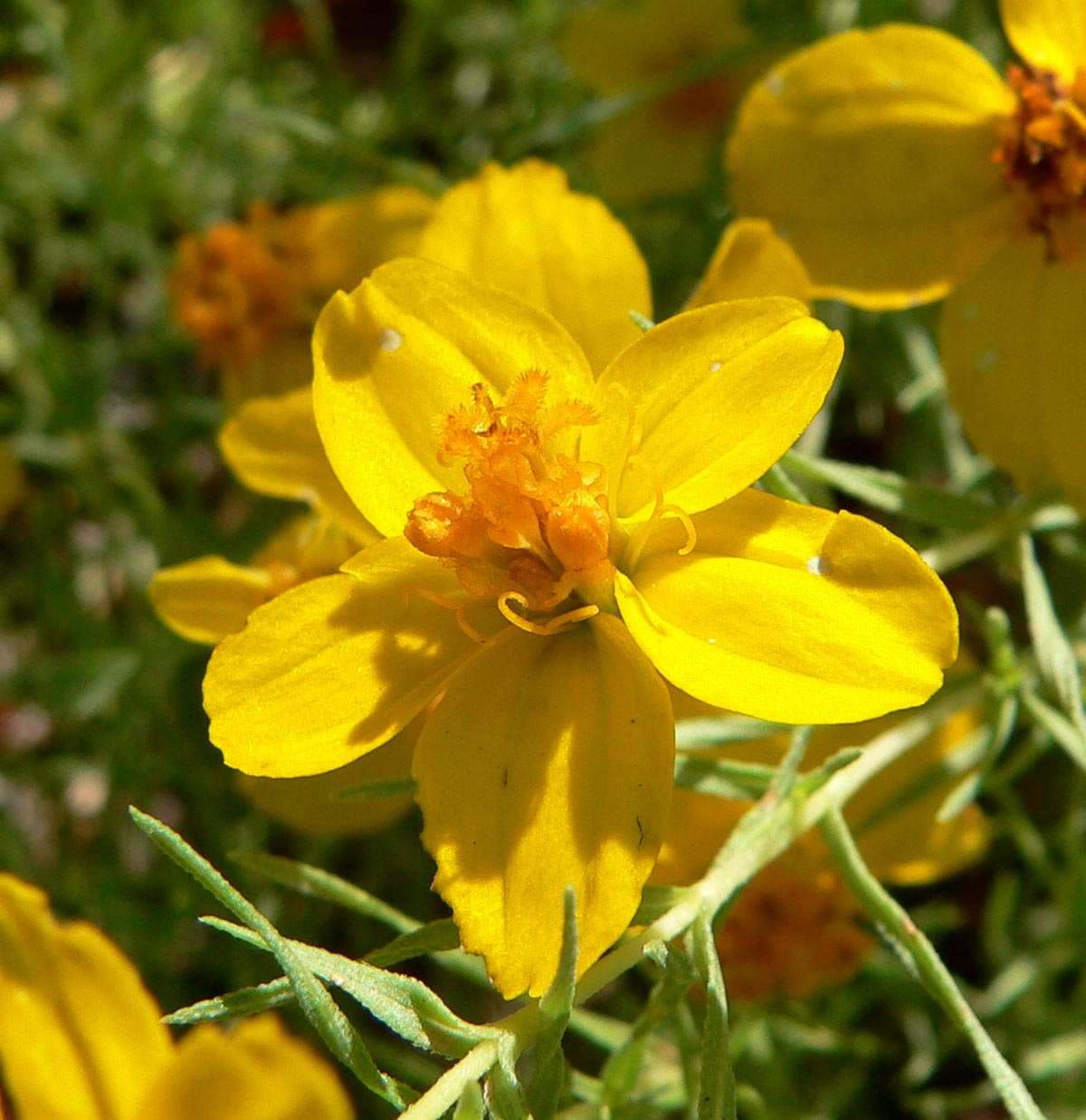
Zinnia grandiflora

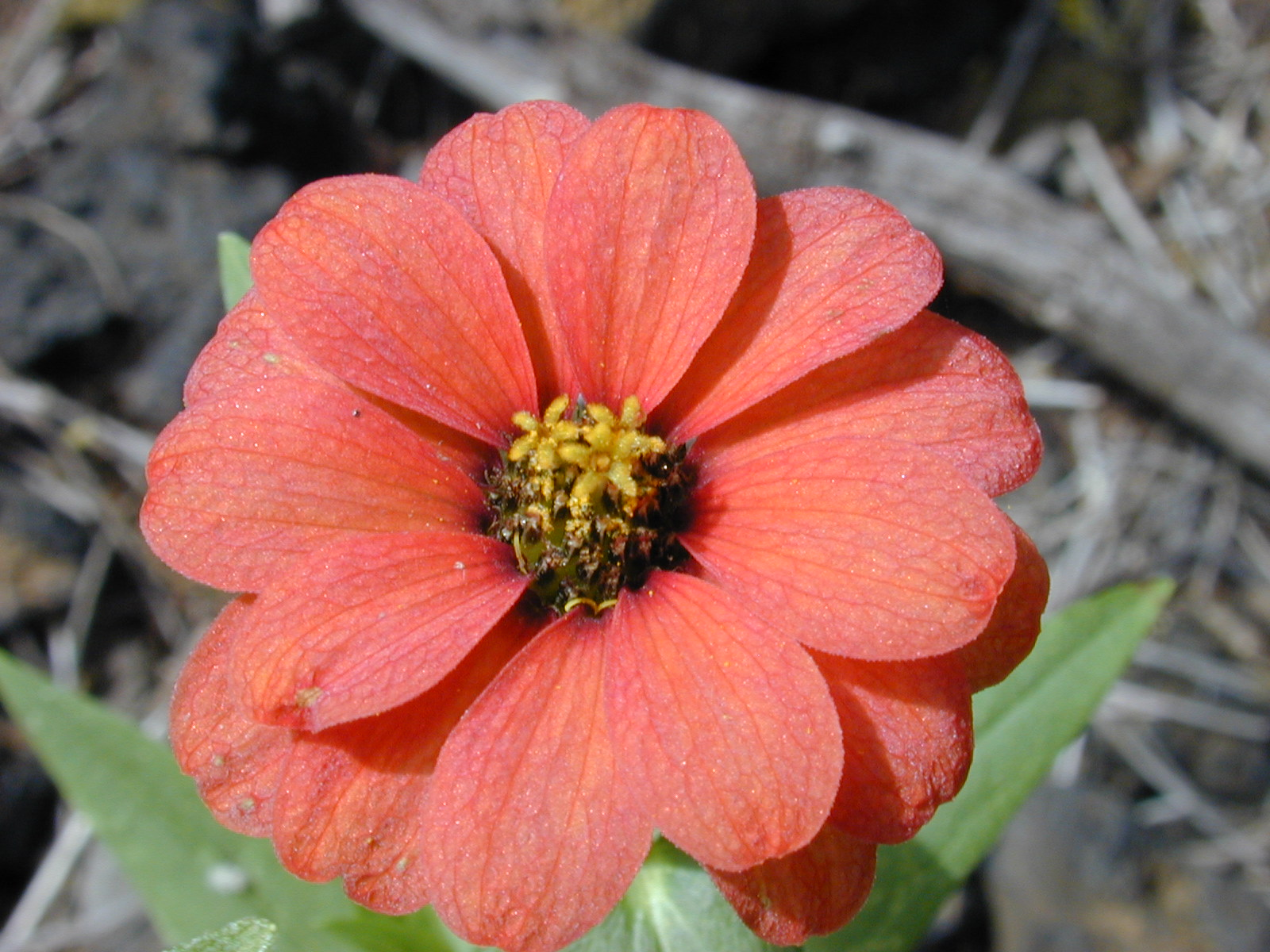
Zinnia peruviana

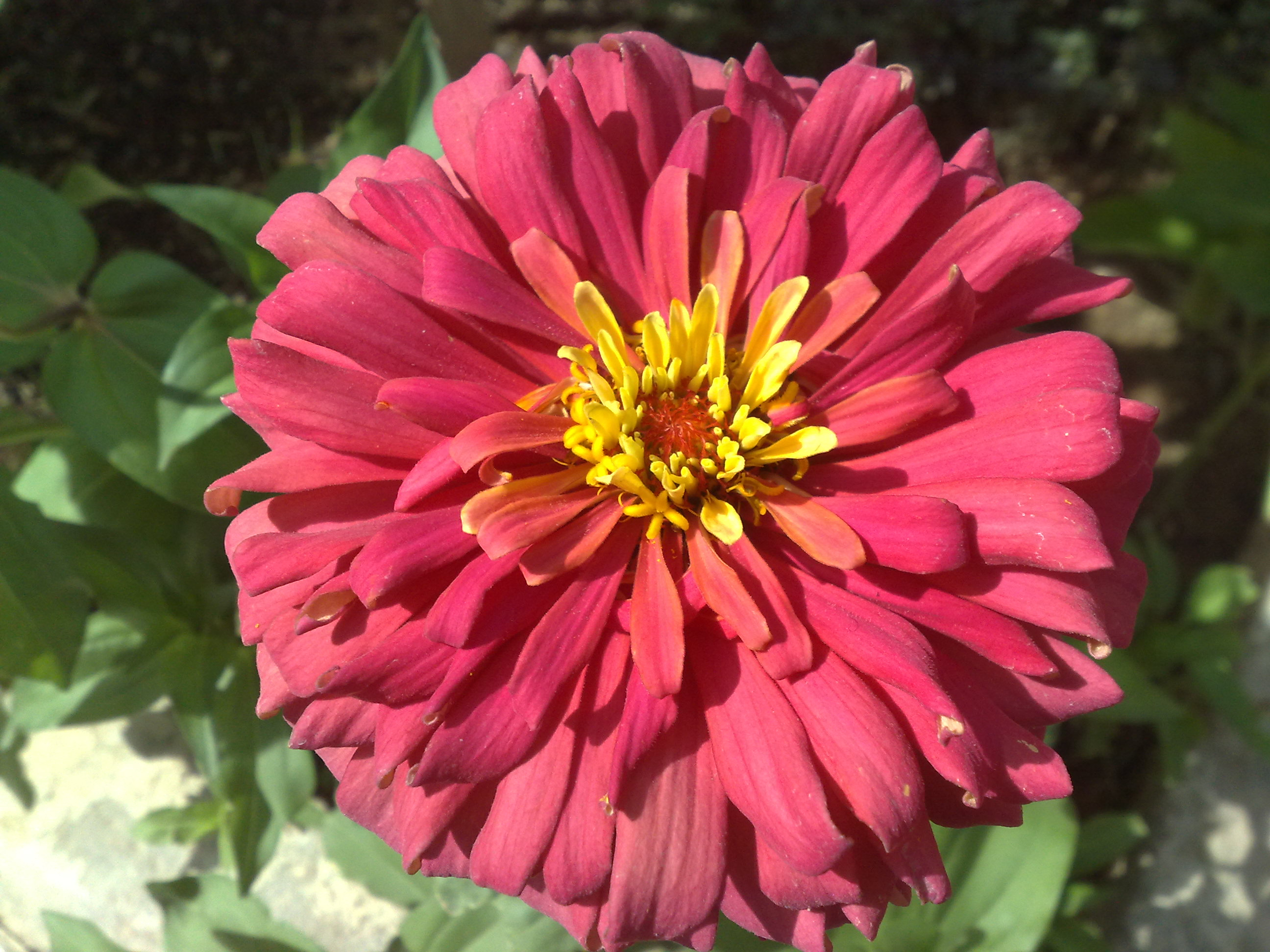
Zinnia elegans

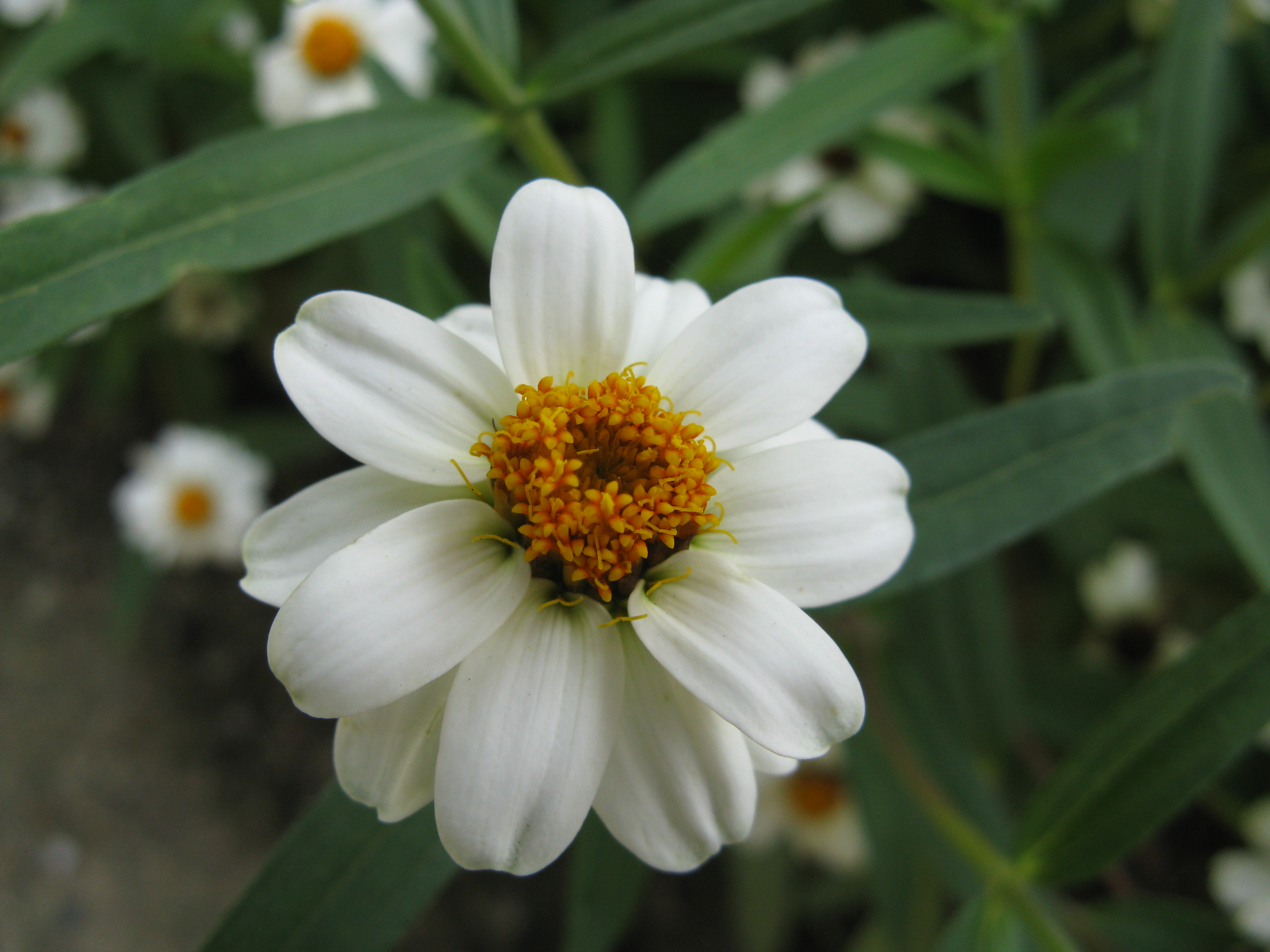
Zinnia angustifolia

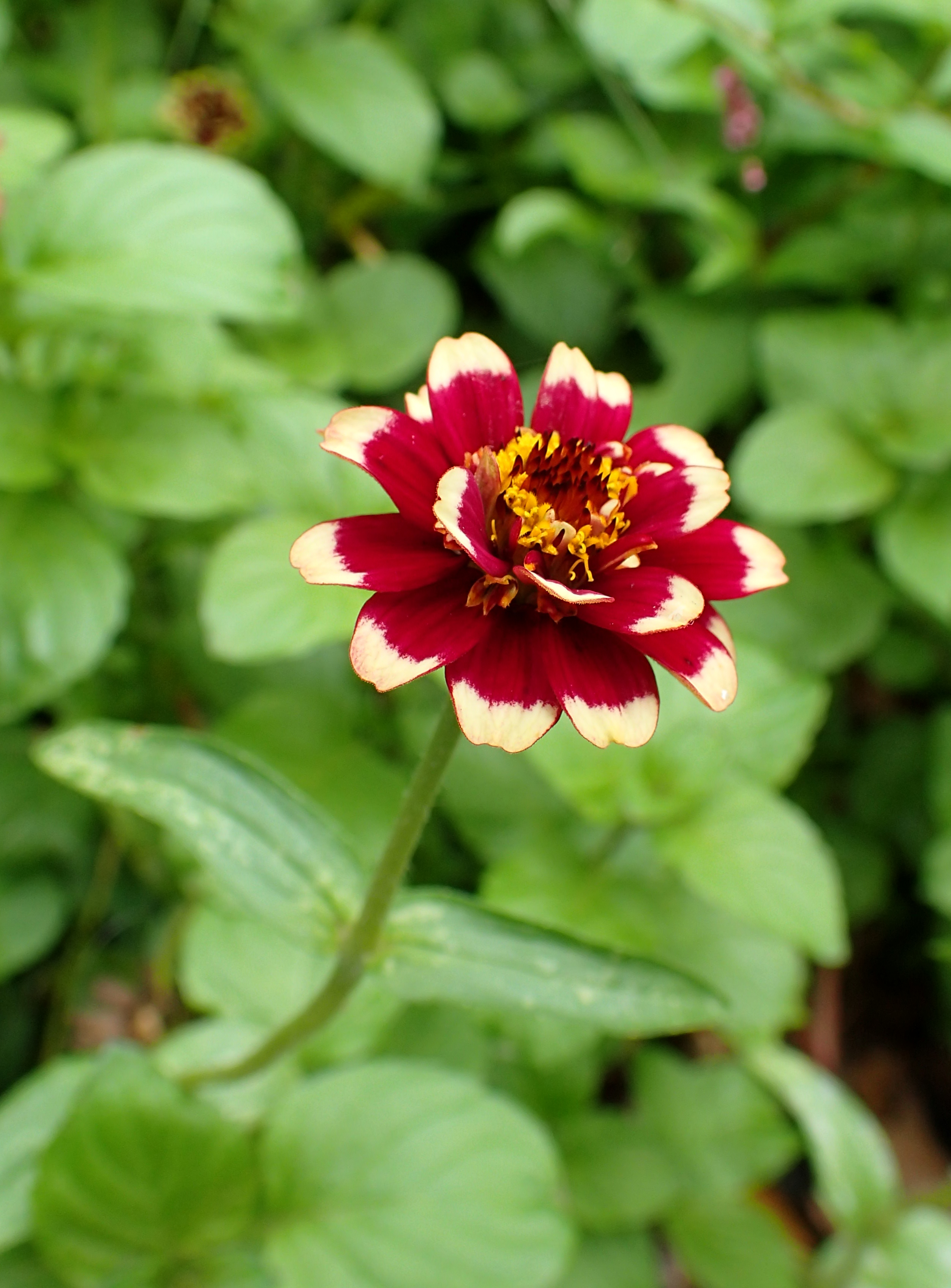
Zinnia haageana

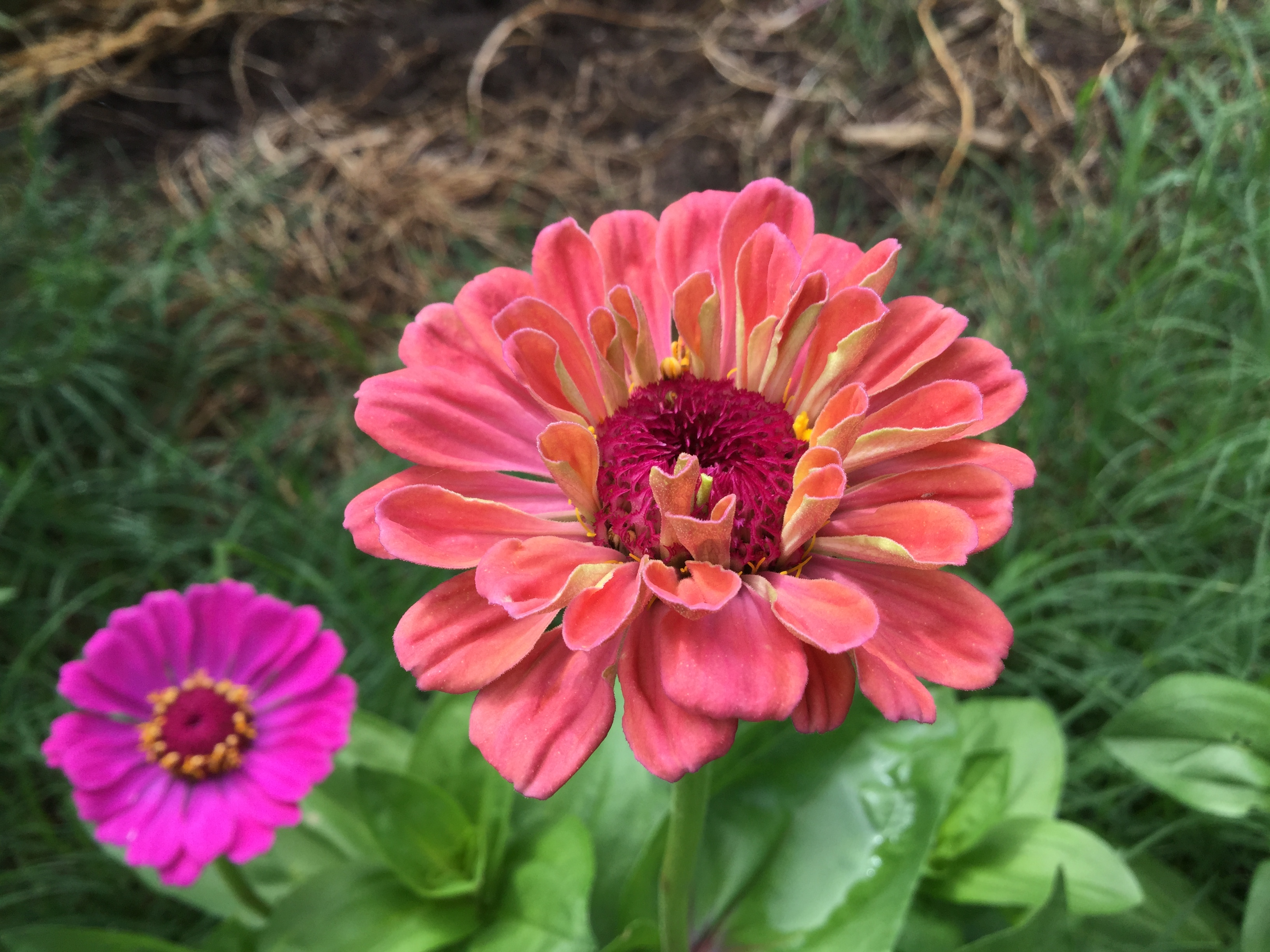
Zinnia elegans

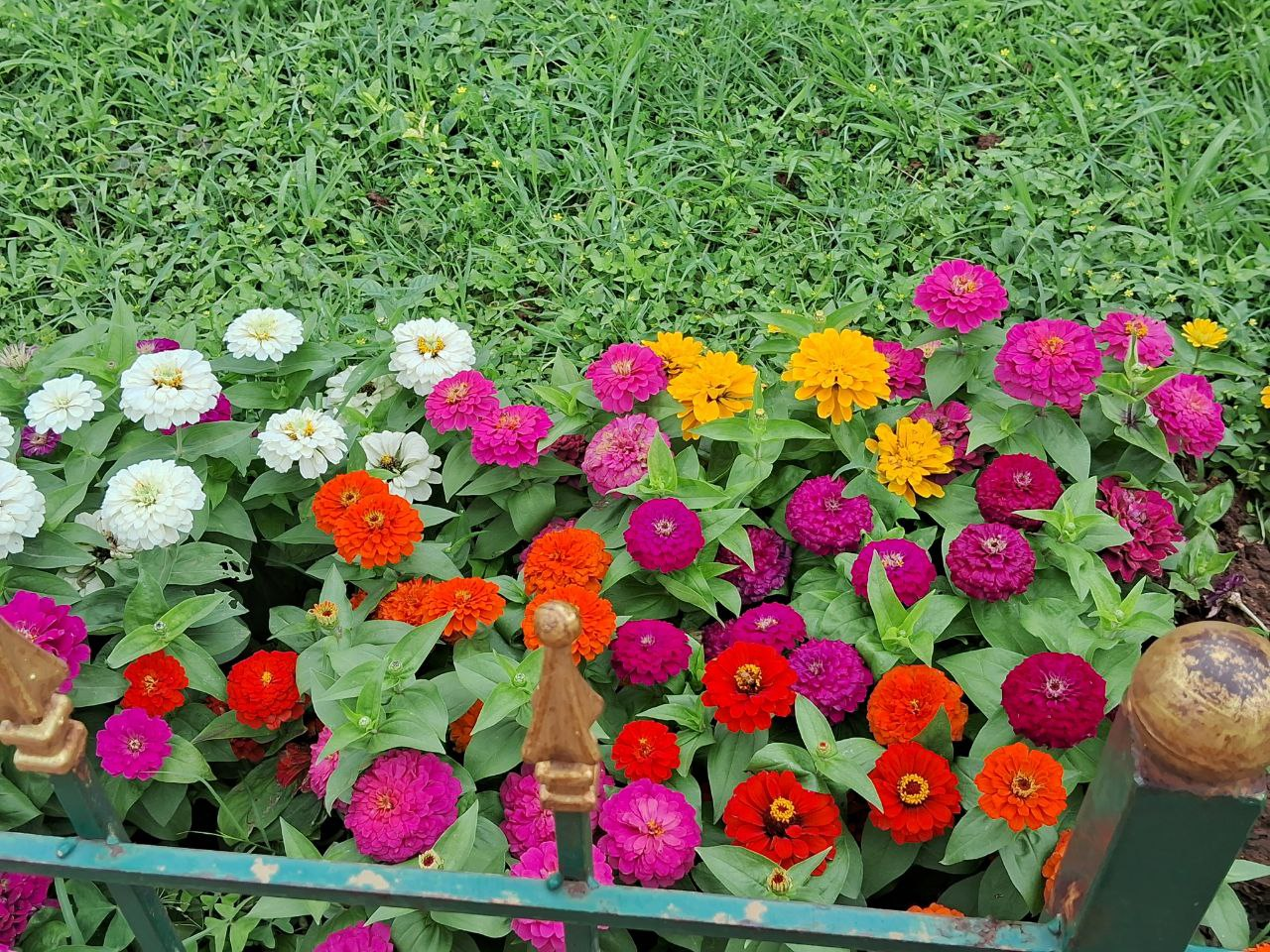
A group of Zinnia flowers

== See also ==
- Arthur B. Howard
