= Johann Gottfried Zinn =

German anatomist and botanist (1727–1759)

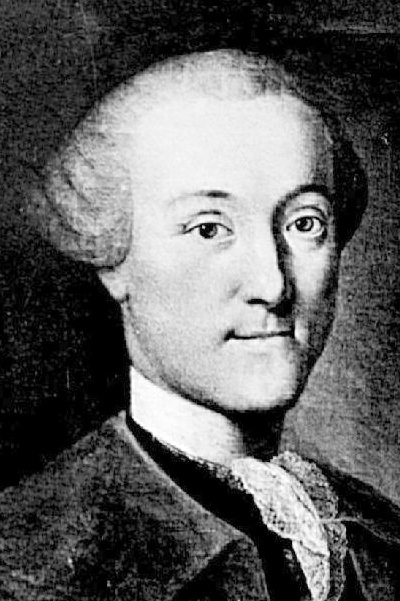
- Born: December 4, 1727; Schwabach, Franconia, Holy Roman Empire (now Germany)
- Died: April 6, 1759 (aged 31); Göttingen, Electorate of Hanover, Holy Roman Empire (now Germany)
- Occupations: Botanist, anatomist

Johann Gottfried Zinn (pronounced [ˈjoːhan ˈɡɔtfʁiːt ˈtsɪn]; December 4, 1727 – April 6, 1759) was a German anatomist and botanist and was a member of the Berlin Academy.

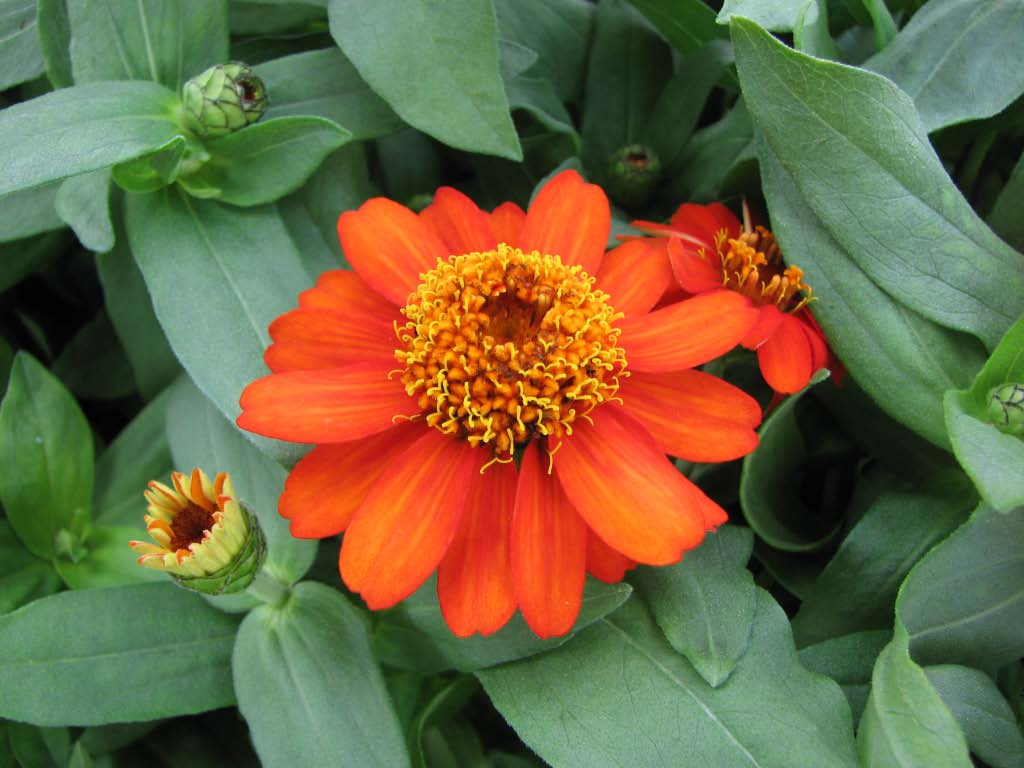
A Zinnia flower

== Biography ==
Johann Gottfried Zinn was born in Schwabach. Considering his short life span, Zinn made a great contribution to the study of anatomy. In his book Descriptio anatomica oculi humani, he provided the first detailed and comprehensive anatomy of the human eye.

In 1753 Johann Gottfried Zinn became director of the Botanic garden of the University of Göttingen, and in 1755, professor in the medical faculty.

In 1757 Zinn described the orchid genus Epipactis that belongs to the family Orchidaceae.

He died in Göttingen.

== Eponyms ==
Botanist Carl Linnaeus designated a genus of flowers in the family Asteraceae native from Mexico as Zinnia in his honour.

He coined the anatomic terms:

- Zonula ciliaris Zinnii, now called Zonule of Zinn
- Anulus tendineus communis also known as Annulus of Zinn (or Circle of Zinn).

== Works ==
- A description of the flora around Göttingen 1753.
- Descriptio anatomica oculi humani iconibus illustrata 1765.
