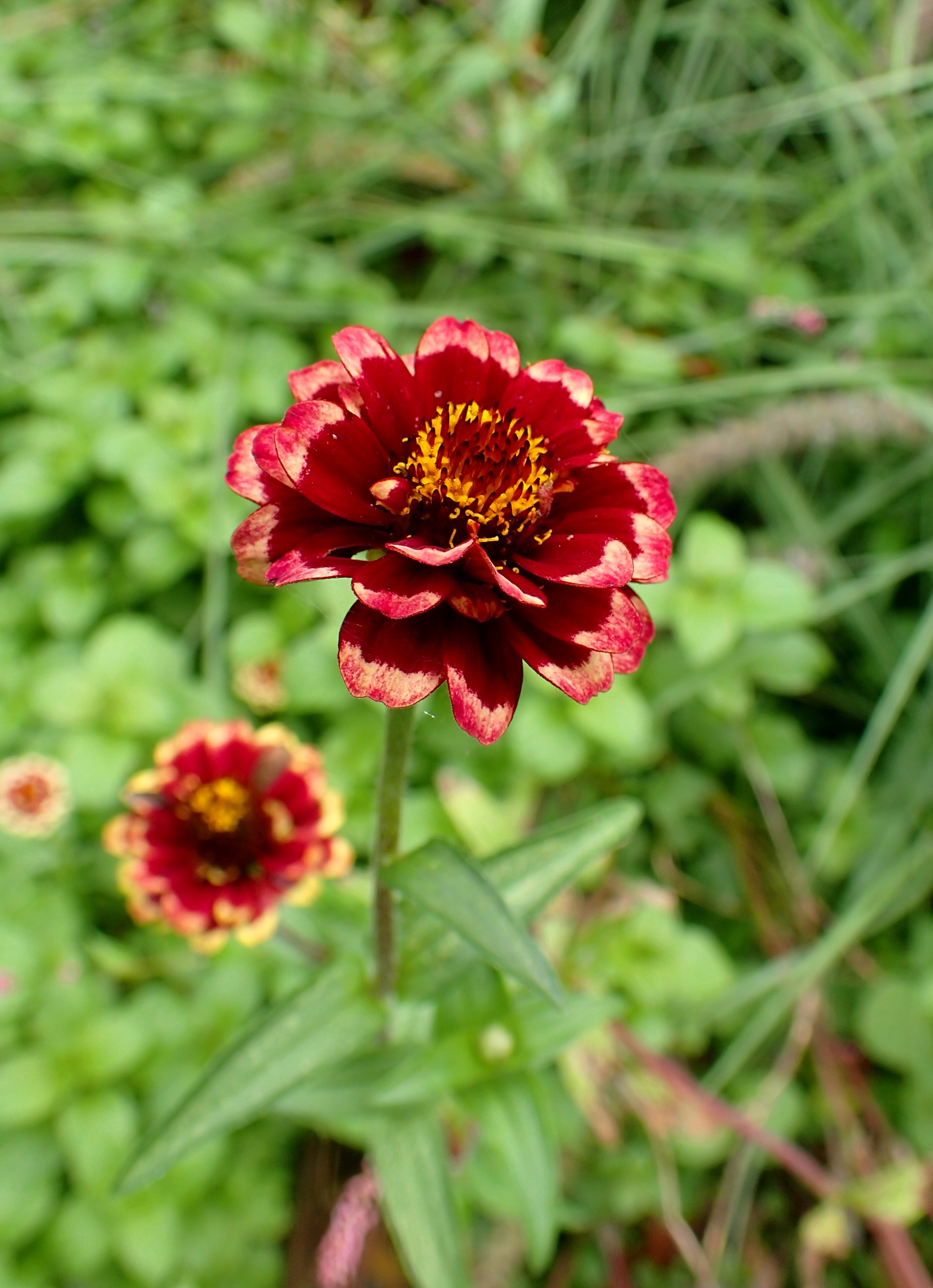

Scientific classification
- Kingdom: Plantae
- Clade: Embryophytes
- Clade: Tracheophytes
- Clade: Angiosperms
- Clade: Eudicots
- Clade: Asterids
- Order: Asterales
- Family: Asteraceae
- Tribe: Heliantheae
- Genus: Zinnia
- Species: Z. haageana

Binomial name
- Zinnia haageana Regel

= Zinnia haageana =

Species of flowering plant

Zinnia haageana is a species of flowering plant in the family Asteraceae from Mexico. It is an annual which does not tolerate freezing temperatures, so in temperate zones must be sown under cover, and planted out when all danger of frost is past. Growing to 40 cm (16 in), it prefers a sunny position. The cultivar 'Aztec Orange', with double orange flowers, has received the Royal Horticultural Society's Award of Garden Merit.
