= Zinnia anomala =

Scientific classification
- Kingdom: Plantae
- Clade: Embryophytes
- Clade: Tracheophytes
- Clade: Angiosperms
- Clade: Eudicots
- Clade: Asterids
- Order: Asterales
- Family: Asteraceae
- Tribe: Heliantheae
- Genus: Zinnia
- Species: Z. anomala

Binomial name
- Zinnia anomala A.Gray 1852

Synonyms
- Crassina anomala (A.Gray) Kuntze

Species of flowering plant

Zinnia anomala is a North American species of flowering plants in the family Asteraceae, with the common name shortray zinnia. It is native to western Texas in the United States and also to the States of Coahuila, Nuevo León, and Zacatecas in northern Mexico.

Zinnia anomala is a profusely branched subshrub perennial up to 12 cm (8 inches) tall. Leaves are very narrow, up to 3 cm (1.2 inches) long. The plant produces only one flower head per branch, each head containing about 20 red disc florets, sometimes with no ray florets, other times with 5-8 yellow rays.
