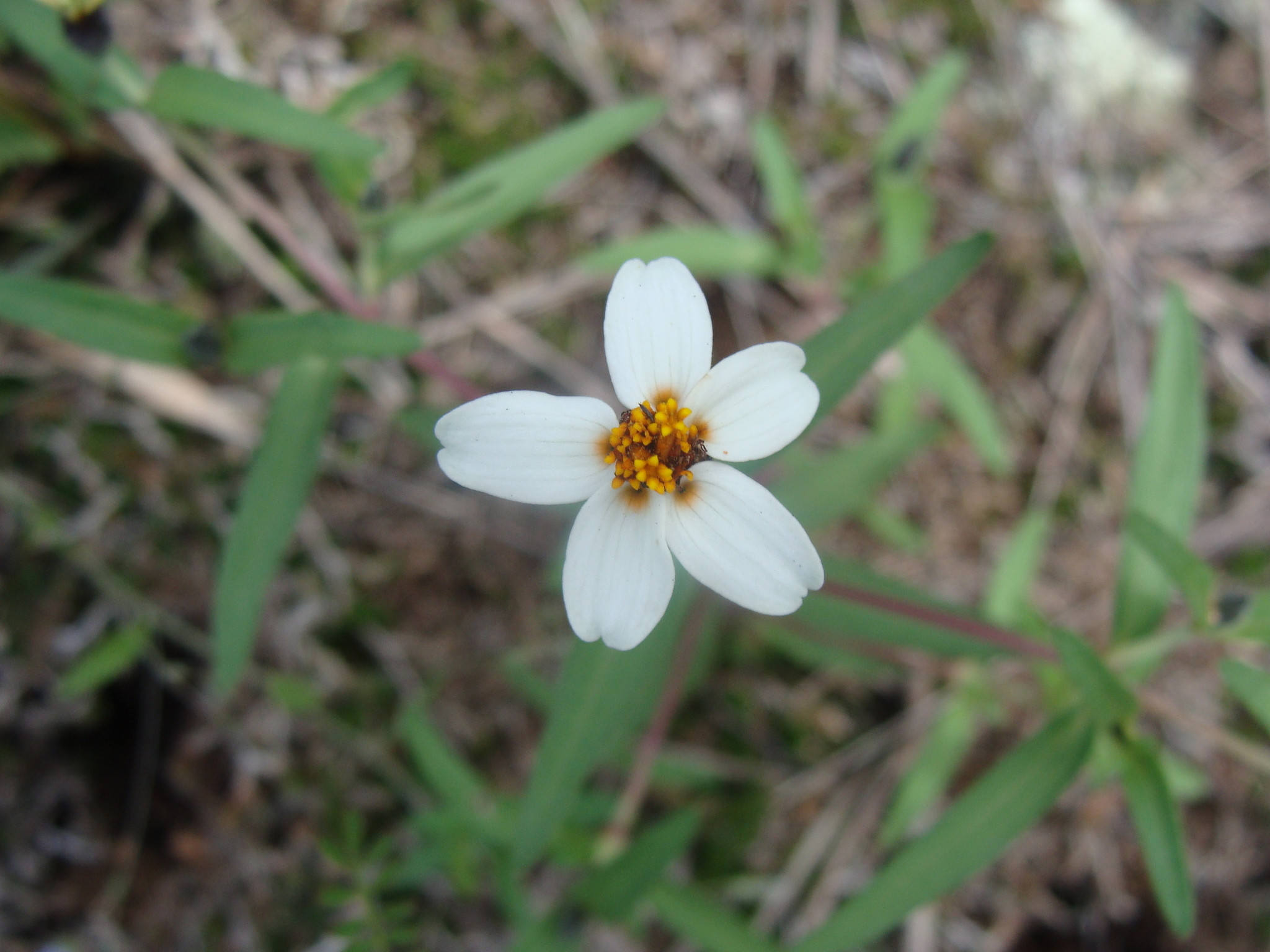

Scientific classification
- Kingdom: Plantae
- Clade: Embryophytes
- Clade: Tracheophytes
- Clade: Angiosperms
- Clade: Eudicots
- Clade: Asterids
- Order: Asterales
- Family: Asteraceae
- Tribe: Heliantheae
- Genus: Zinnia
- Species: Z. bicolor

Binomial name
- Zinnia bicolor Hemsl.

Synonyms
- Crassina bicolor Kuntze; Mendezia bicolor DC.

= Zinnia bicolor =

Species of flowering plant

Zinnia bicolor is a species of flowering plant in the family Asteraceae. It is native to Mexico.
