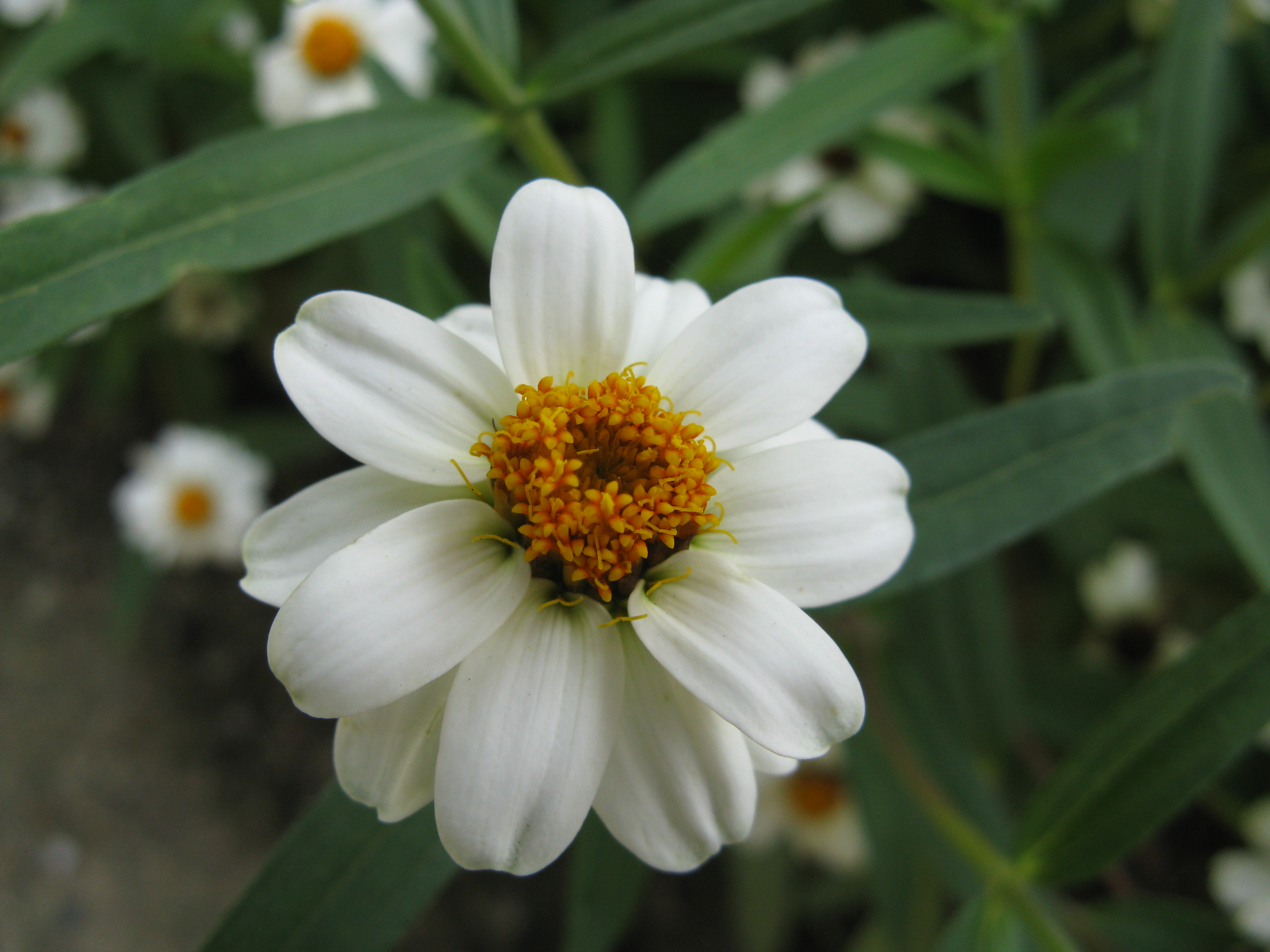
- Zinnia angustifolia 'Star White' in flower

Scientific classification
- Kingdom: Plantae
- Clade: Embryophytes
- Clade: Tracheophytes
- Clade: Angiosperms
- Clade: Eudicots
- Clade: Asterids
- Order: Asterales
- Family: Asteraceae
- Tribe: Heliantheae
- Genus: Zinnia
- Species: Z. angustifolia

Binomial name
- Zinnia angustifolia Kunth 1818

Synonyms
- Crassina angustifolia Kuntze; Crassina linearis (Benth.) Kuntze; Zinnia linearis Benth., syn of var. linearis

= Zinnia angustifolia =

Species of flowering plant

Zinnia angustifolia, the narrowleaf zinnia, is a herbaceous flowering plant species of zinnia native to northern and western Mexico and naturalized in parts of the Southwestern United States. Hybrids between Z. angustifolia and other species of Zinnia are popular garden plants.

== Description ==
Zinnia angustifolia is an annual or perennial growing up to 50 cm (20 inches) tall. The stems have many branches and the herbage is rough with short hairs. The 2–7 cm × 4–8 mm (0.8-2.8 × 0.16-0.32 inches) leaf blades are linear to narrowly elliptic. The heads of flowers have involucres that are mostly hemispheric (shaped like a globe that is cut in half), usually much less than 1 cm high (0.4 inches) or wide. The flowers have bright orange or sometimes yellow ray corollas, but in cultivated plants, the flowers may be white or a variety of other colors.

Varieties of wild populations

- Zinnia angustifolia var. angustifolia
- Zinnia angustifolia var. littoralis (B.L.Rob. & Greenm.) B.L.Turner

Cultivars

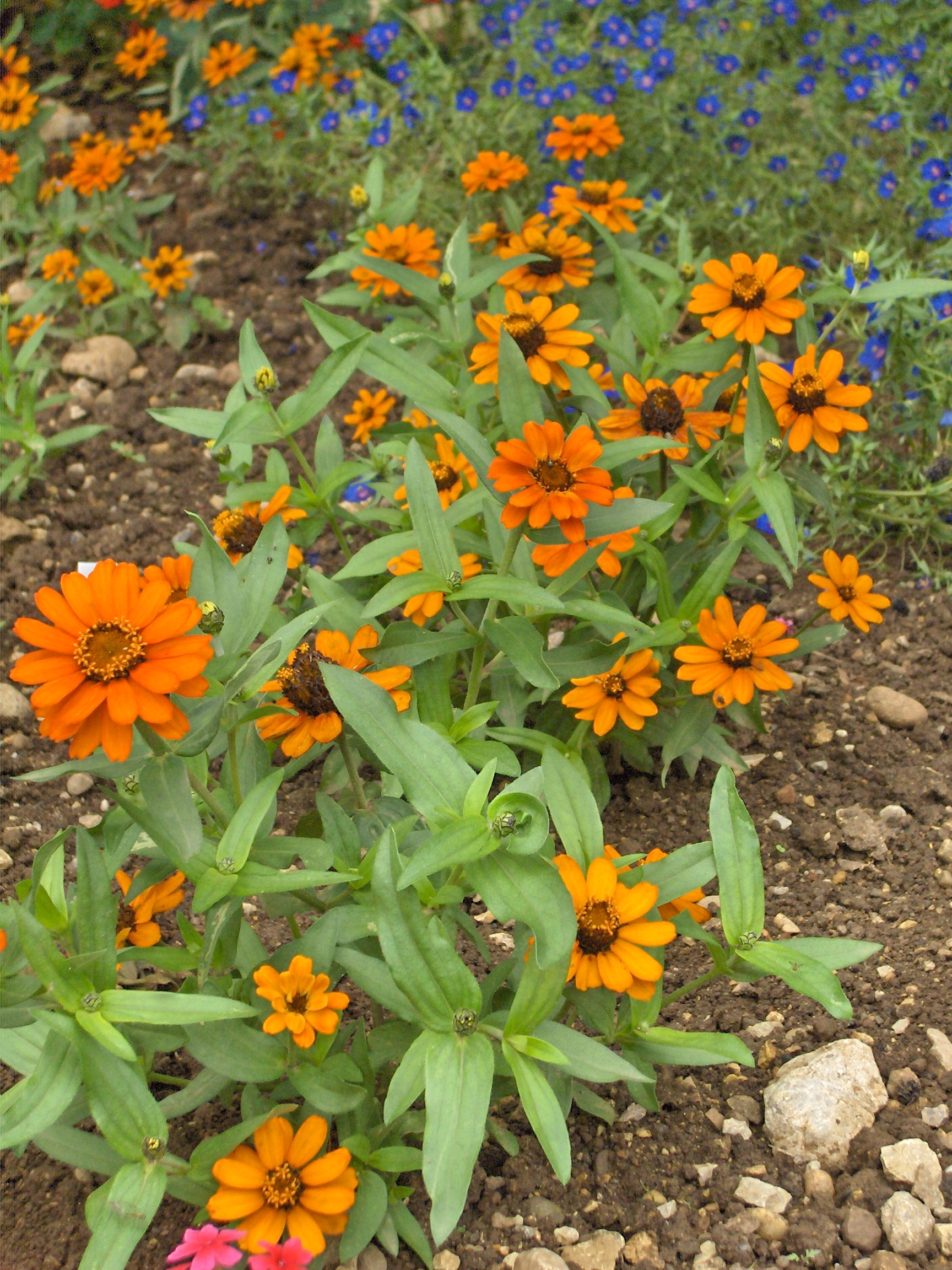
Zinnia angustifolia Profusion Orange, a cultivar of the Profusion series.

This species has many cultivars belonging to three classes:

- The Profusion series (Zinnia angustifolia x elegans): orange, cherry, double cherry, apricot, deep apricot, coral pink, fire or white flowers.
- The Star series: orange, white or gold flowers.
- The Crystal White cultivar: with white flowers.
