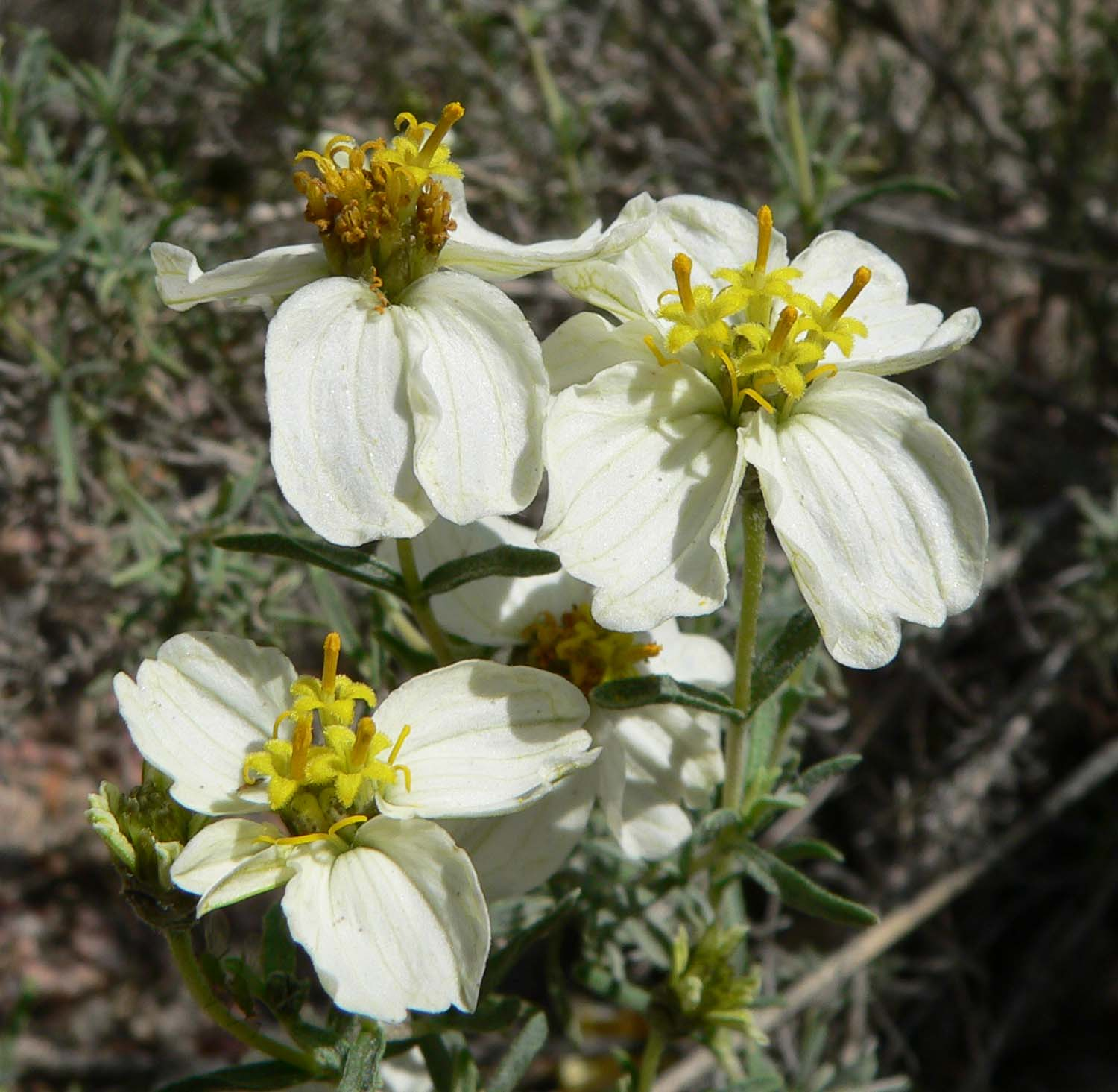

Scientific classification
- Kingdom: Plantae
- Clade: Embryophytes
- Clade: Tracheophytes
- Clade: Angiosperms
- Clade: Eudicots
- Clade: Asterids
- Order: Asterales
- Family: Asteraceae
- Tribe: Heliantheae
- Genus: Zinnia
- Species: Z. acerosa

Binomial name
- Zinnia acerosa (DC.) A.Gray

Synonyms
- Diplothrix acerosa DC.; Crassina acerosa (DC.) Kuntze

= Zinnia acerosa =

Species of flowering plant

Zinnia acerosa is a low-growing perennial flowering plant native to the Southwestern United States and Northern Mexico. Common names include desert zinnia, wild zinnia, white zinnia, and spinyleaf zinnia. It is a popular landscape plant in the southwest due to its low water use and long bloom period. The flowers also serve as a food source for southwestern butterflies.

In the United States, Zinnia acerosa grows in Arizona, Utah, New Mexico, and Texas. In Mexico, it has been found in Sonora, Chihuahua, Coahuila, Durango, Nuevo León, Zacatecas, and San Luis Potosí.

Zinnia acerosa is a small, branching subshrub up to 16 cm (6.4 inches) tall. Leaves are very narrow, sometimes needle-shaped, up to 2 cm (0.8 inches) long. The plant produces flower head one per stem, each head with 4-7 yellow or white ray florets surrounding 8-13 yellow or purple disc florets.
