= Ox tongue =

Ox tongue may refer to:

- Beef tongue
- Picris and Helminthotheca (oxtongues), especially Helminthotheca echioides, the bristly ox-tongue
- Fistulina hepatica, ox tongue fungus
- Ox tongue spear
