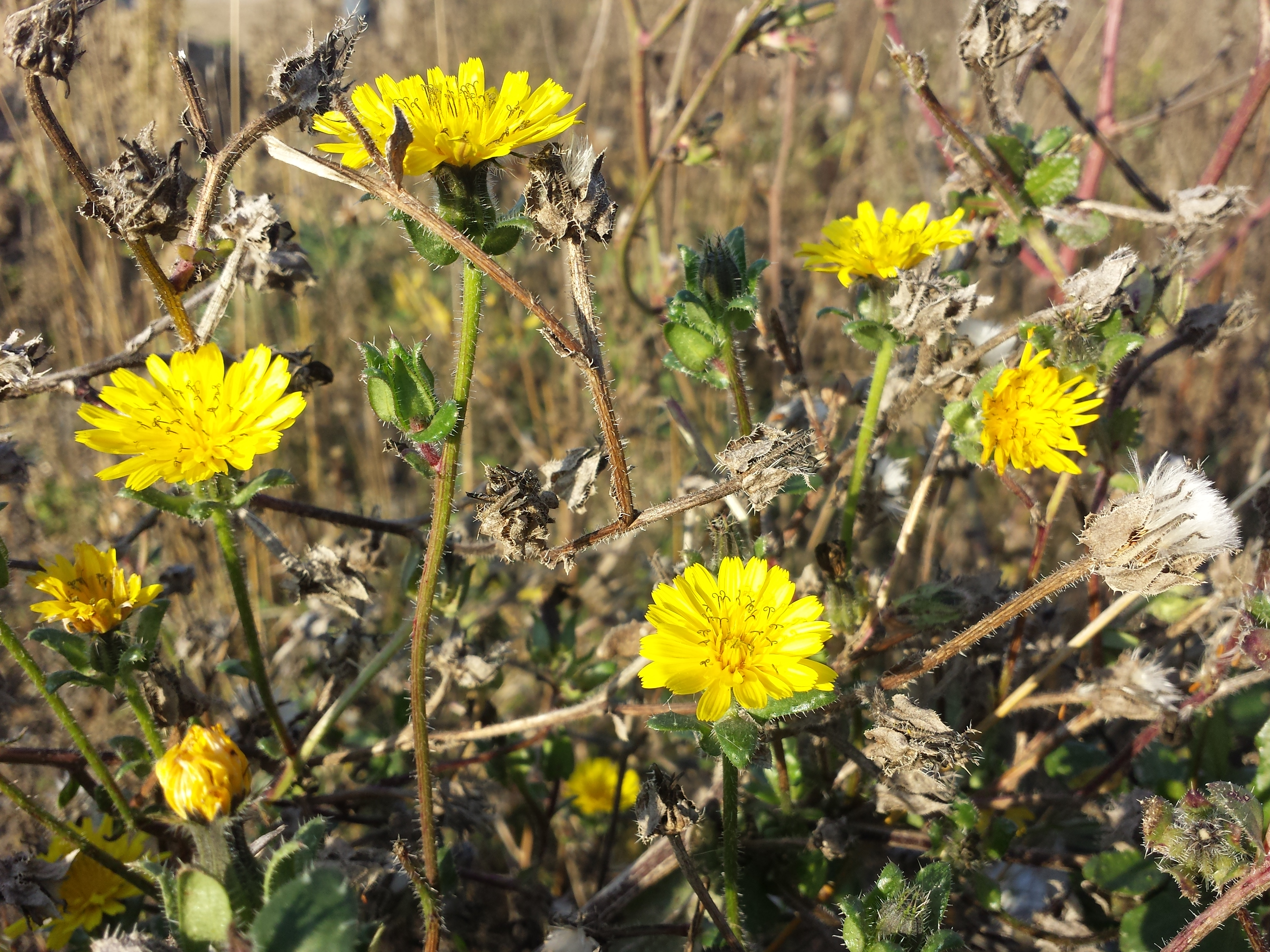

Conservation status
- Least Concern (IUCN 3.1)

Scientific classification
- Kingdom: Plantae
- Clade: Embryophytes
- Clade: Tracheophytes
- Clade: Spermatophytes
- Clade: Angiosperms
- Clade: Eudicots
- Clade: Asterids
- Order: Asterales
- Family: Asteraceae
- Genus: Helminthotheca
- Species: H. echioides

Binomial name
- Helminthotheca echioides (L.) Holub

= Helminthotheca echioides =

Species of flowering plant

Helminthotheca echioides, known as bristly (or prickly) oxtongue, is a sprawling annual or biennial herb native to Europe and North Africa. It was originally placed within the genus Picris but is often separated within the small genus Helminthotheca alongside a few other (mainly North African) plants which also have the distinctive outer row of bracts around the flowerheads. It is a ruderal plant, found on waste ground and agricultural soils around the world, and in some places it is considered a troublesome weed.

== Description ==
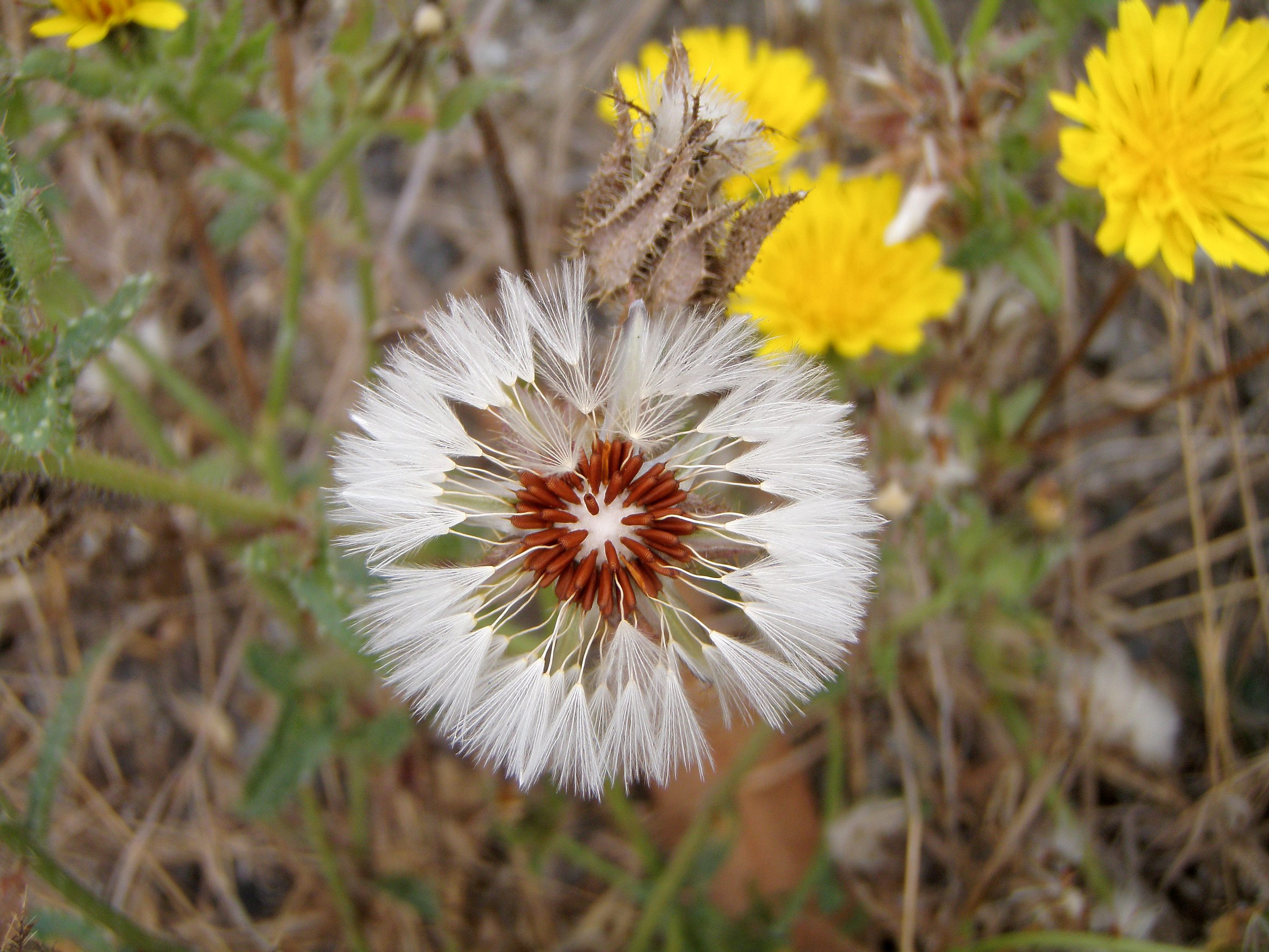
The seed head of Helminthotheca echioides

Bristly oxtongue is an annual to biennial herb with an erect or sprawling habit that grows up to 90 cm (35 in) tall (often up to 150 cm in fertile soils and shady places), with a solid, furrowed stem and spreading branches. The basal rosette leaves are 10–20 cm (4–8 in) long, oblanceolate with a short petiole, whereas the cauline leaves are lanceolate and sessile with clasping, cordate bases. On the leaves and stem (especially on the basal leaves) there are distinctive sharp bristles, 2 mm long, with swollen whitish bases that resemble blisters. On other parts of the plant there is a scattering of smaller, anchor-shaped hairs with recurved double-pronged tips which make the plant feel sticky.

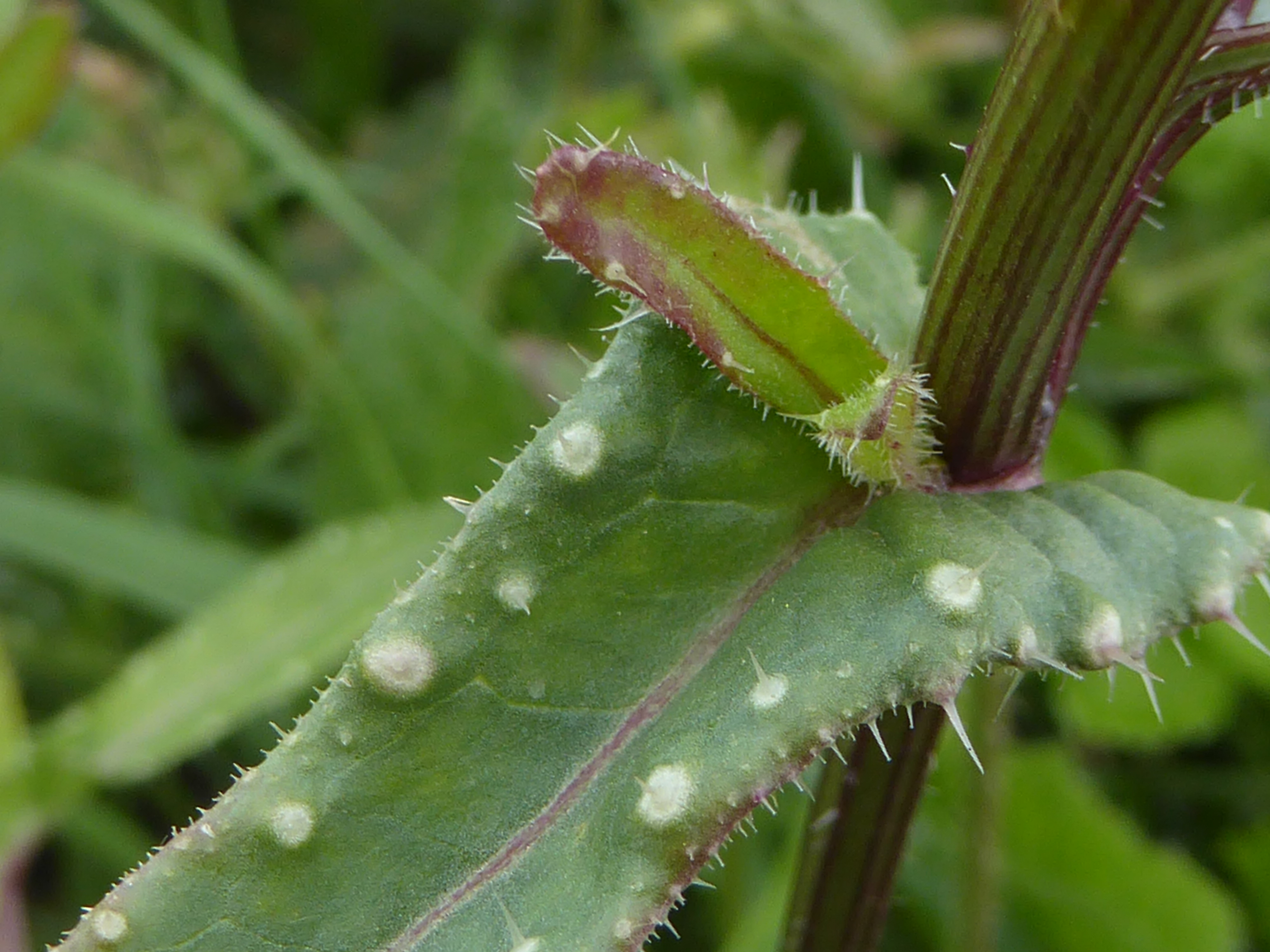
Stiff, bulbous-based hairs on the leaf surface are characteristic of bristly oxtongue

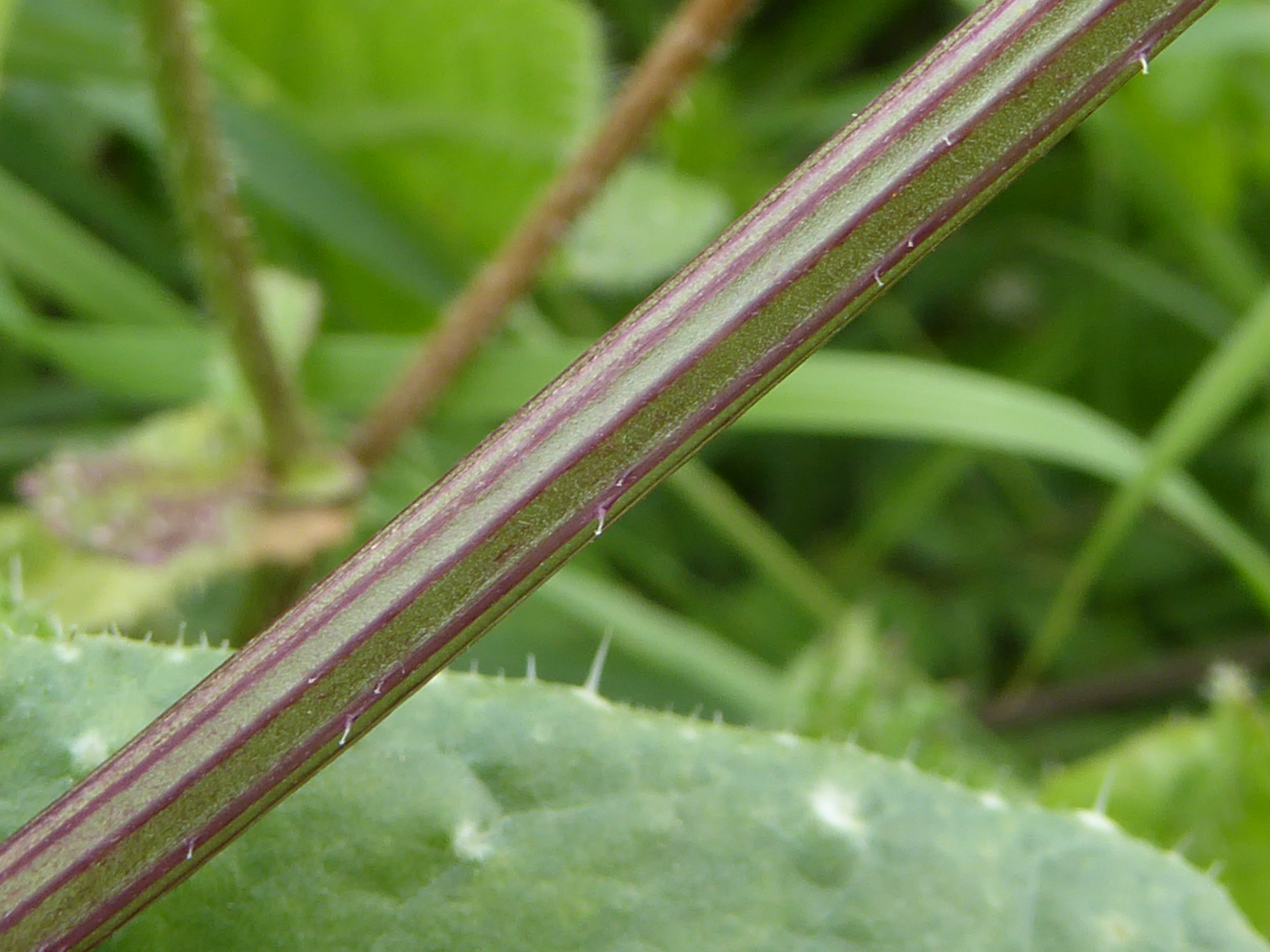
Close-up of the stem, showing typical coloration

In northern Europe it flowers from May to October. The inflorescences arise on long stalks from the leaf axils in an irregular corymb. Each flowerhead is 2–3.5 cm (0.8–1.4 in) wide with numerous yellow ray flowers (the outer florets sometimes tinged red/brown). They are surrounded by three rows of involucral bracts: an inner ring which is narrow and blunt-tipped with a spiny awn that arises just below the tip; a middle ring of tiny bracts which are easily overlooked and sit at the base of the inner row (they are important in separating this from other species of Helminthotheca); and an outer ring which is made up of 3 to 5 large, ovate-cordate flaps that later surround the seed head. This outer ring of bracts are the defining feature of the genus Helminthotheca.

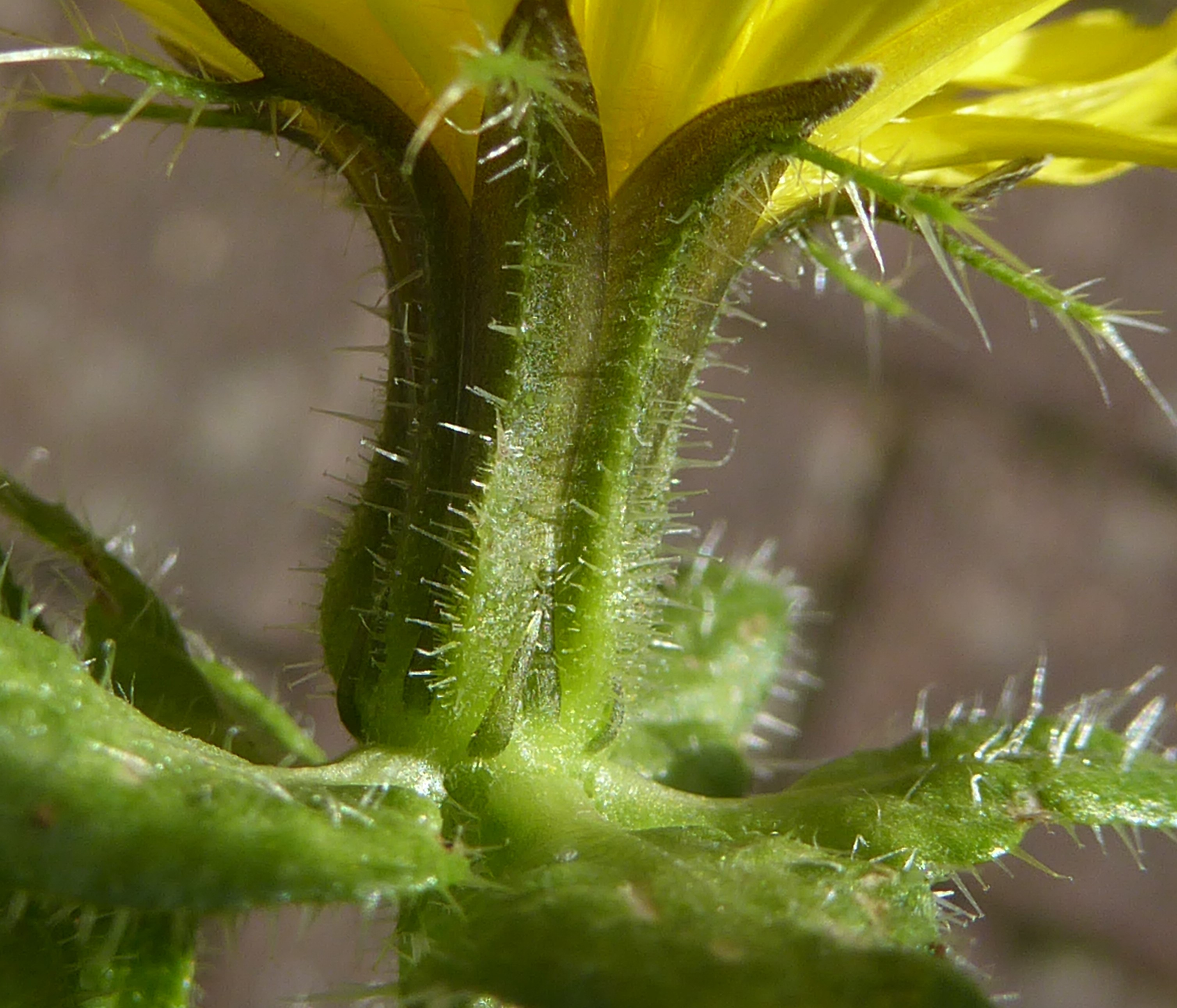
The second ring of tiny bracts, at the base of the inner whorl, are useful in differentiating the species within the genus.

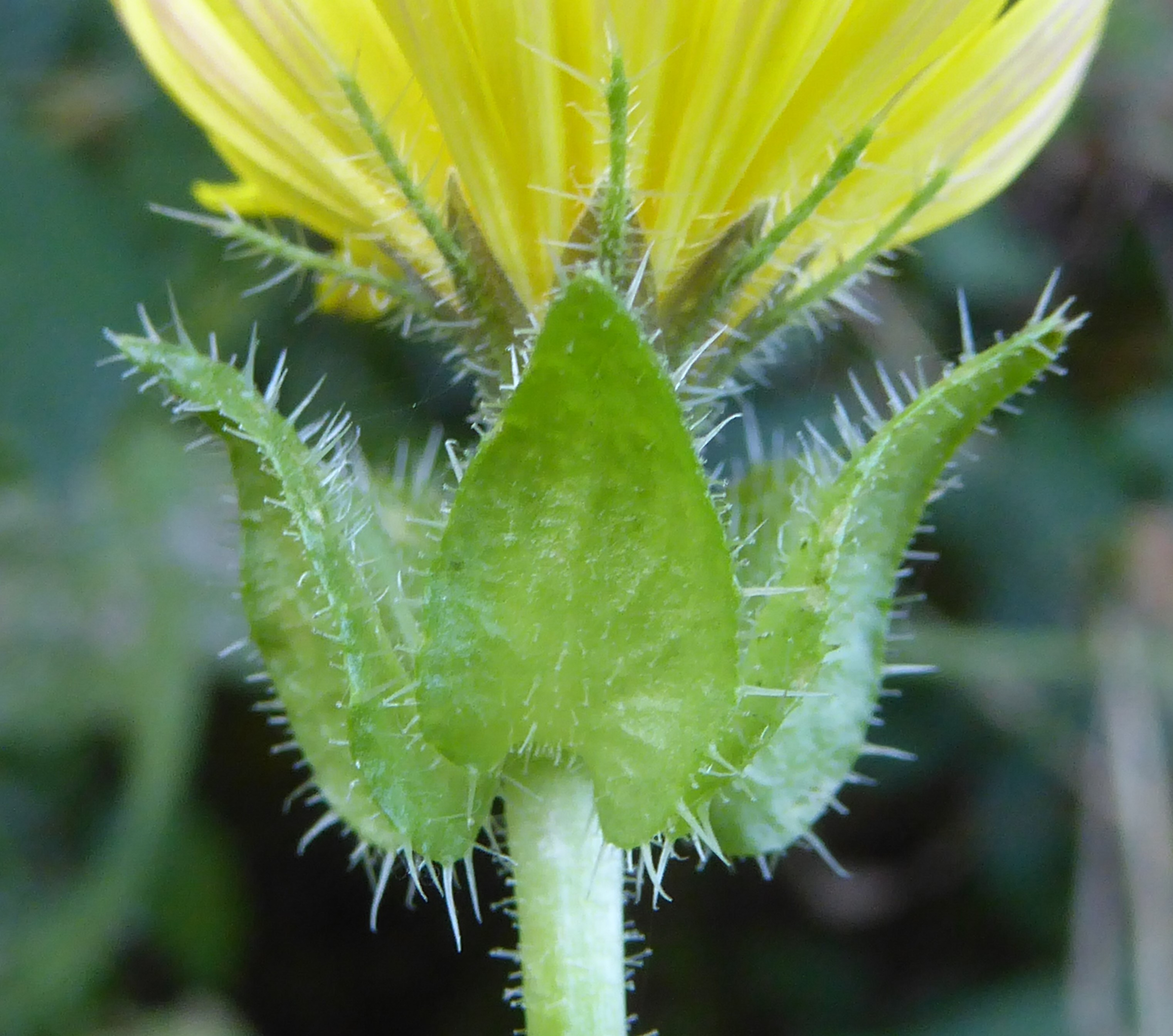
Outer and inner rows of involucral bracts on a flowerhead of bristly oxtongue

Helminthotheca echioides is said to be heterocarpic (i.e. it has fruits of two different shapes), however, not all authors report this. When it is so, the outer achenes (which are retained inside the closed-up seedhead after the central ones have dispersed) are slightly longer (7 mm) and curved, while the inner ones are only 5 mm long and straight. The normal achenes are yellow to orange or brown in colour and have transverse scaly ridges, and a narrowed tip (beak) about as long as the body, to which is affixed a pappus of two rows of white, feathery plumes which enable the seeds to be dispersed by the wind. Reproduction is believed to be apomictic, so the plants effectively clone themselves, but the flowers are also visited by bees.

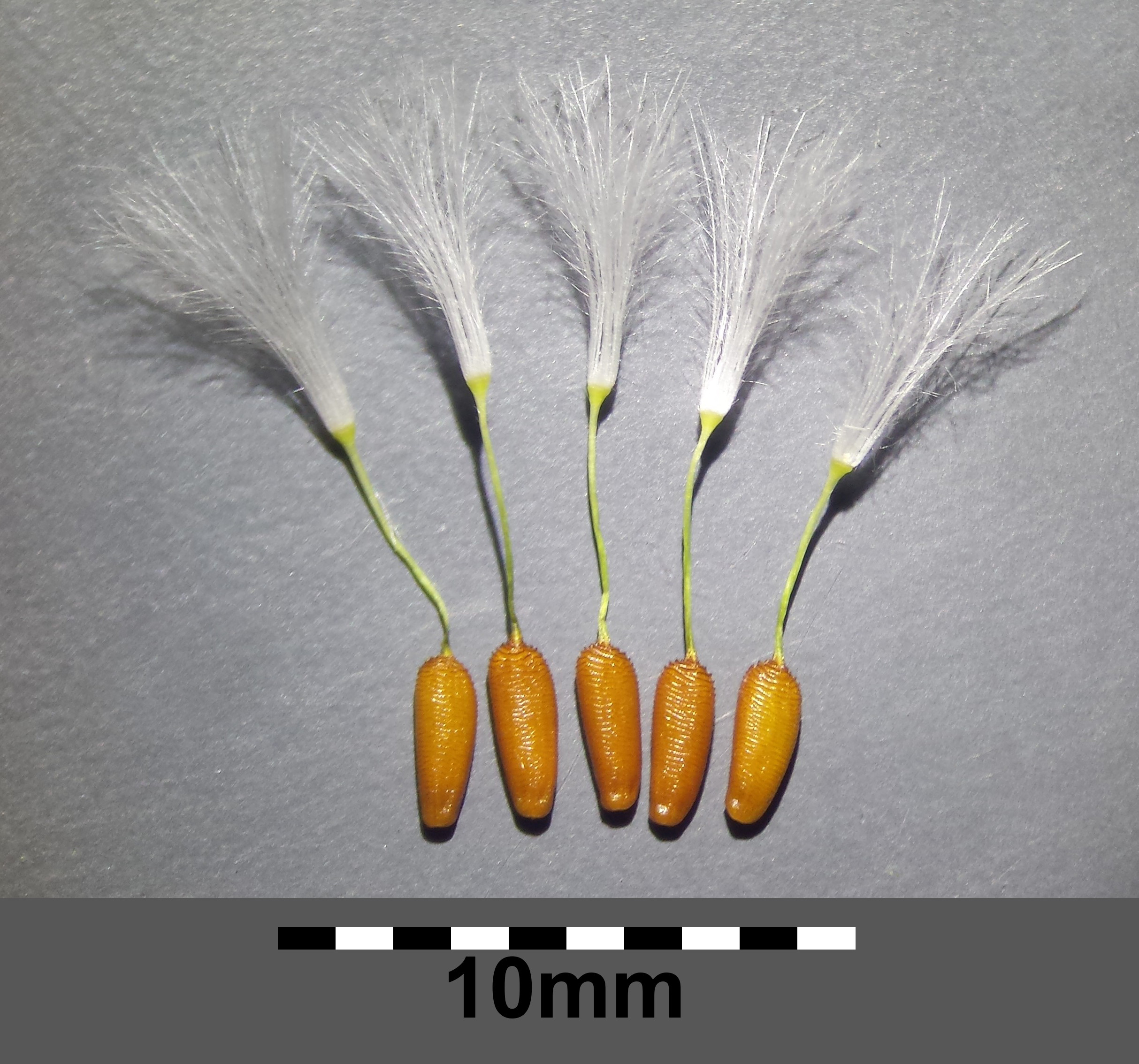
The seeds of bristly oxtongue apparently resemble the eggs of intestinal parasites.

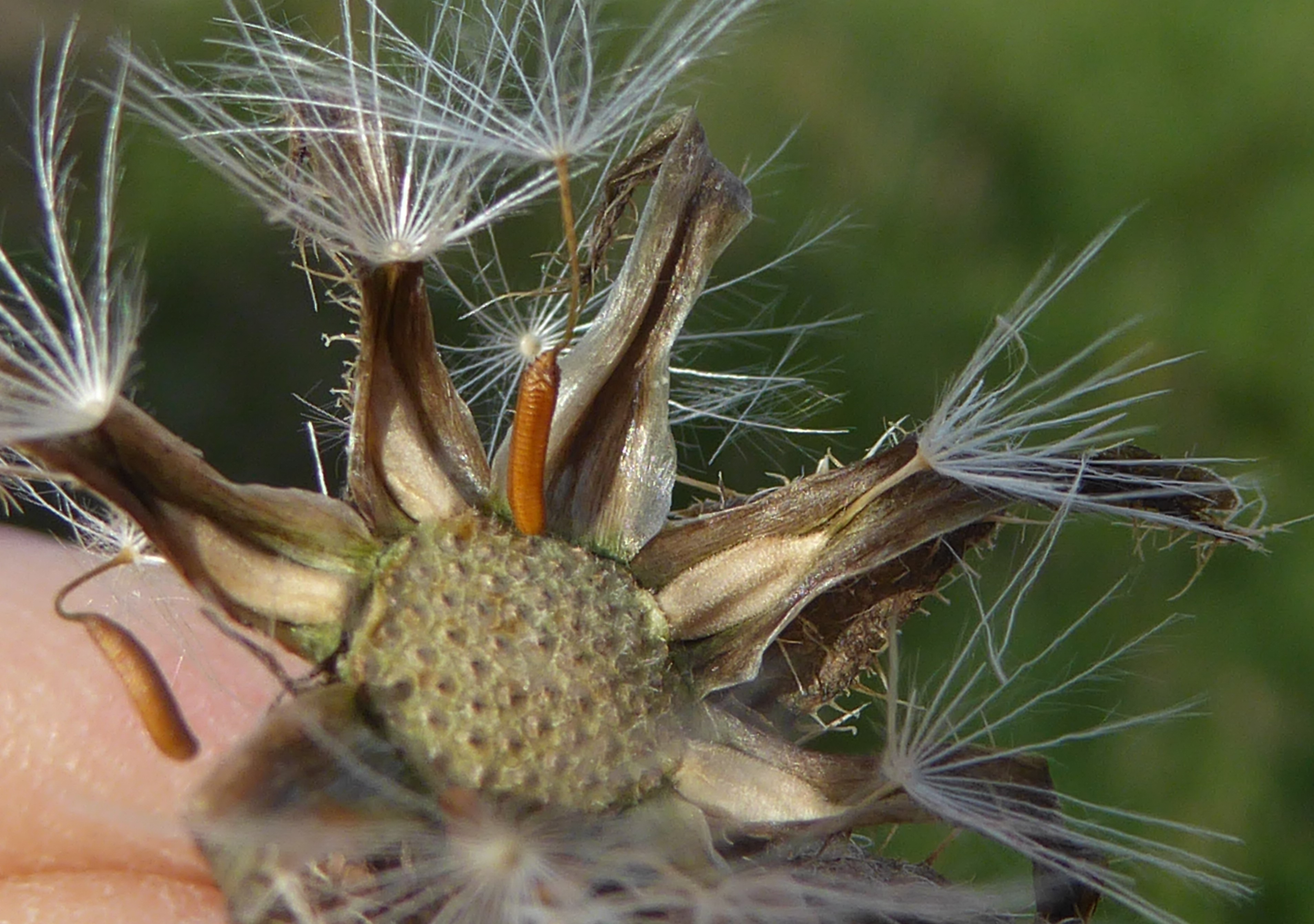
The outermost fruits in a flowerhead are sometimes different to the ones on the disk.

== Taxonomy ==
The genus Helminthotheca was originally described by the pre-Linnean author Sébastien Vaillant in 1754 but, because such names are ruled out by the Code of Nomenclature, the recognised author is Johann Gottfried Zinn, who listed it in his Description of the flora around Göttingen in 1757. However, Linnaeus had by this time already published a valid name for bristly oxtongue in Species Plantarum, so Linnaeus's name, Picris echioides, is the basionym and has precedence over the name Zinn used. Prickly oxtongue has therefore been assigned to two different genera from earliest days, but the combination of Zinn's Helminthotheca and Linnaeus's echioides was not formed until 1973, when the name was coined by the Czech botanist Josef Holub in a paper in the journal Folia Geobotanica & Phytotaxonomica. In the English-speaking world, endorsement for the new combination was given by Walter Lack in a paper in the journal Taxon in 1975.

Many other synonyms for Helminthotheca echioides have been coined over the years, which are listed in the International Cichorieae Network: Cichorieae Portal.

Modern molecular studies show that Picris and Helminthotheca are closely related. The studies are consistent with the current view that they be considered separate genera. Anatomically, they are separated mainly by the presence of an outer row of enlarged involucral bracts in Helminthotheca.

Its chromosome number is 2n = 10.

Helminthotheca echioides is not known to hybridise with any other species.

A number of infraspecific taxa have been described, varying in their leaf shape, although they are not widely accepted. Sell & Murrell list four varieties in Britain:

- var. mollis (Duby) P.D. Sell, with large dentate but not incised leaves
- var. pratensis (Chevall.) P.D. Sell, narrowly elliptical dentate leaves
- var. echioides, with broadly elliptical leaves
- var. incisa P.D. Sell, with large, deeply incised leaves.

The generic name Helminthotheca derives from the Ancient Greek ἕλμινθος (helmins, helminthos), which means "intestinal worm", and θήκη (theca), which is a box or a case (used in anatomy and zoology to describe the sheath around an organ), to make the word "worm-case". It refers to the appearance of the seeds of oxtongue, which look rather like nematode eggs. The "theca" part of the name might be a reference to the way the capitulum closes up after fruiting, trapping some of the seeds within the "case" of the dead flowerhead. The specific epithet echioides comes from the similarity of the leaves to those of viper's bugloss, which also have blister-like hairs on the surface. The suffix -oides means "-like".

The common name also describes the shape and appearance of the leaves.

== Similar species ==
Hawkweed oxtongue has very similar flowers to bristly oxtongue, but they can easily be separate by these features:

- Hawkweed oxtongue: no blisters on the leaves, distinctly wavy edges to the leaves, and recurved bracts around the flowerheads
- Bristly oxtongue: blisters on the leaves and the characteristic bracts around the flowerhead.

At the rosette stage, there are two plants in Britain which are very similar to bristly oxtongue: viper's bugloss and teasel.

- Viper's bugloss has distinctly more dense rosettes, more glaucous leaves with a concolorous central vein (reddish or pale in bristly oxtongue) and is covered in long (3 mm) hairs.
- Teasel has large spines along the midrib on the lower side of the leaves.
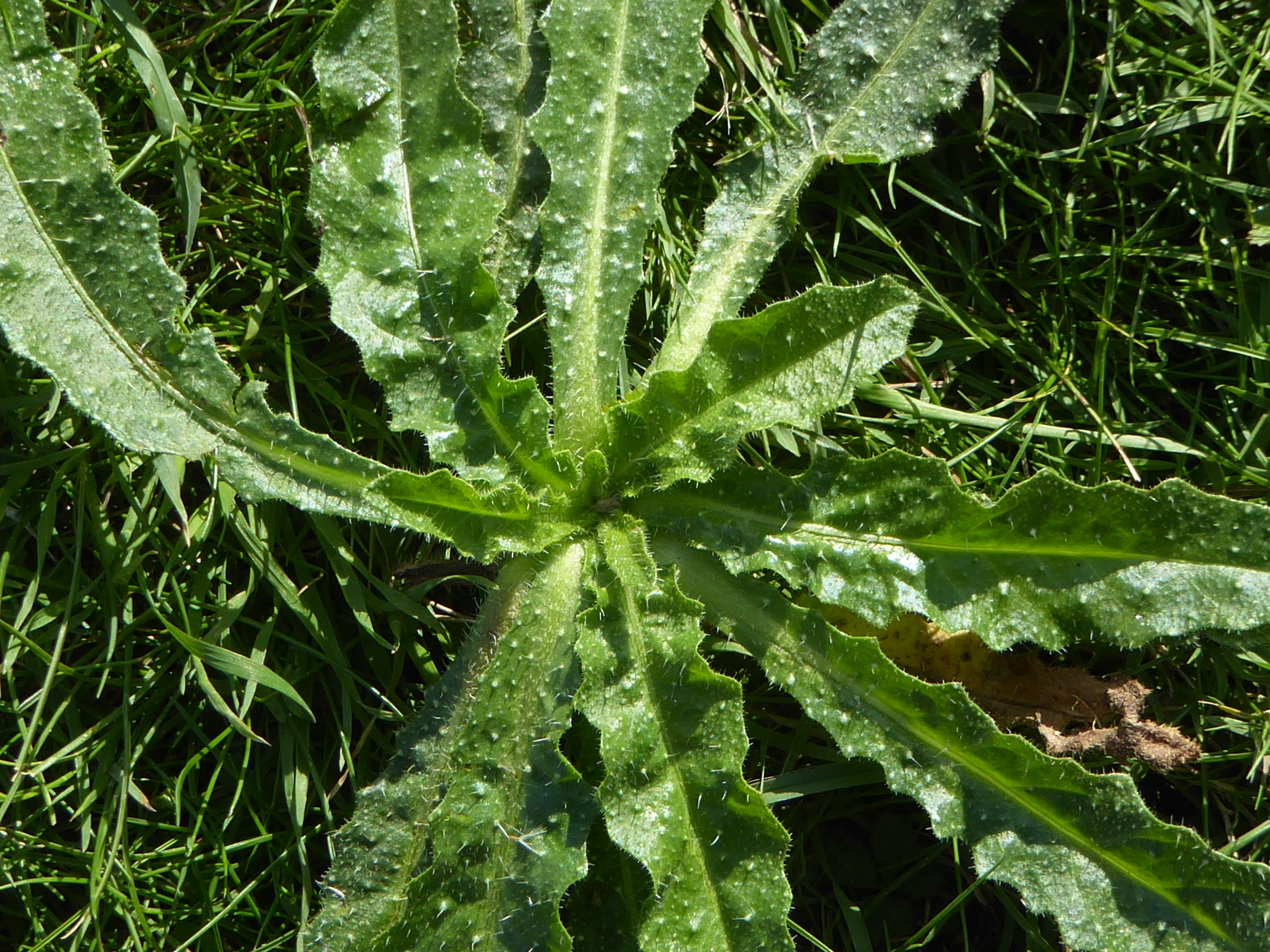
Bristly oxtongue

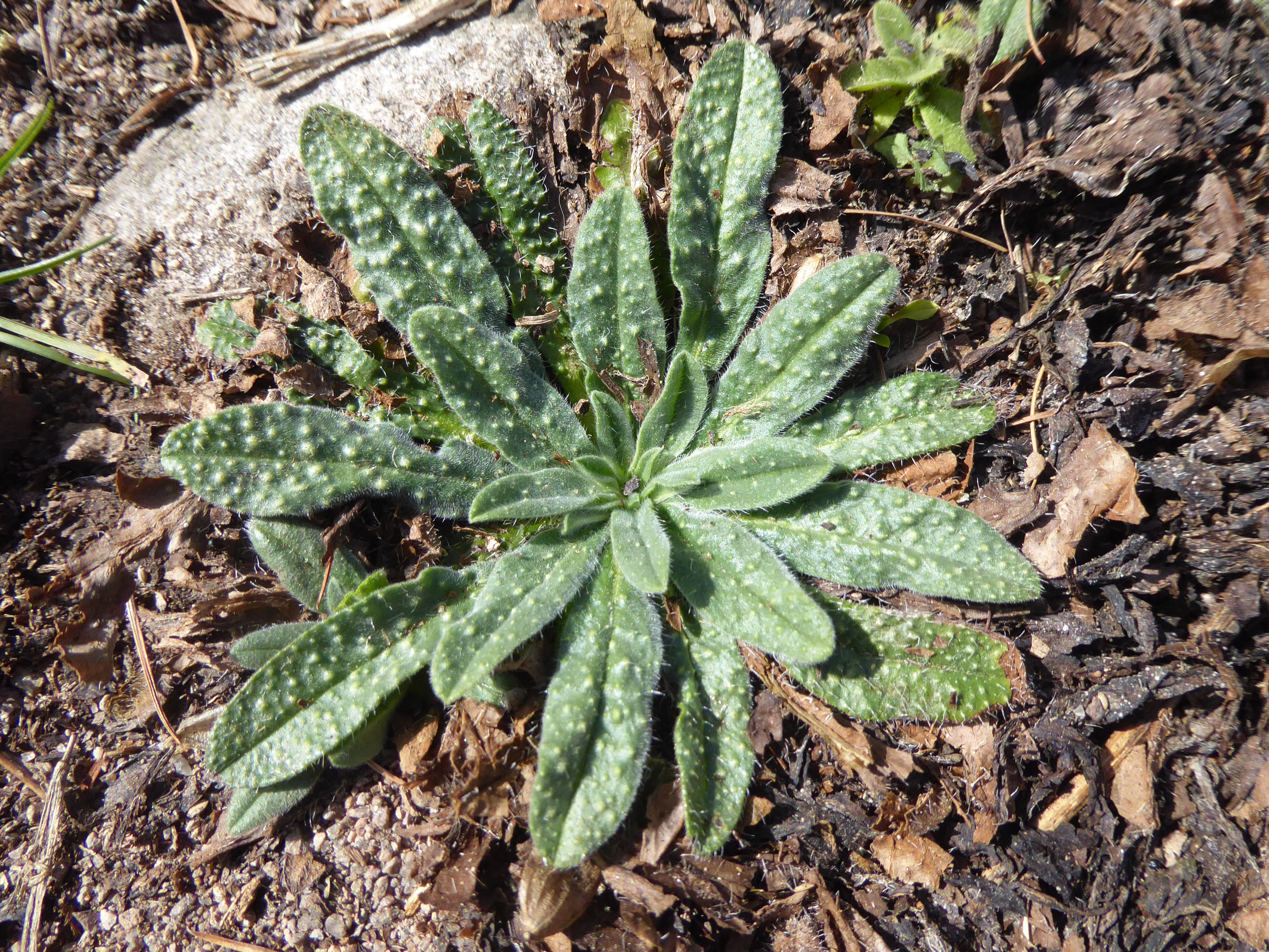
Viper's bugloss

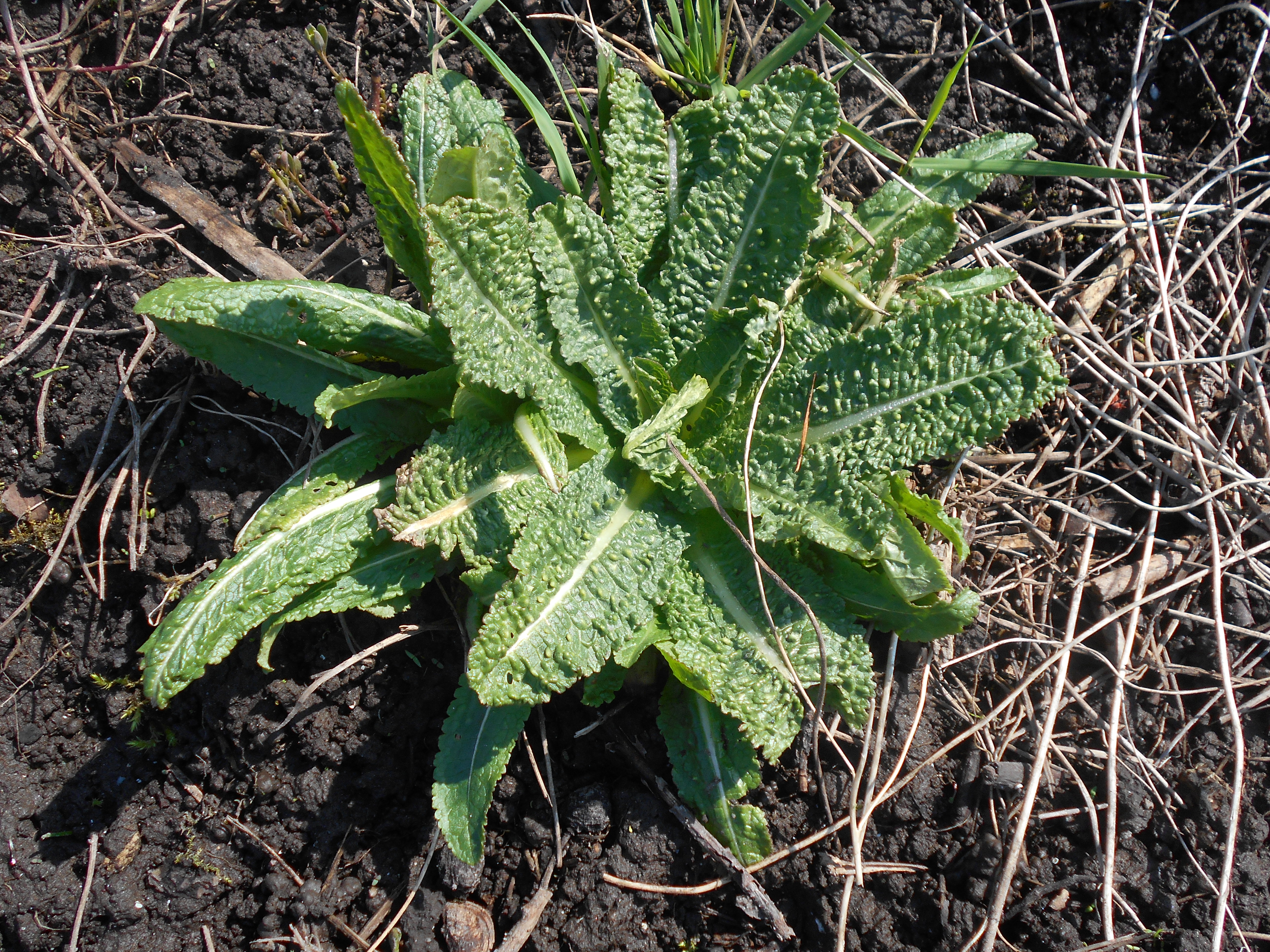
Teasel

== Distribution and status ==
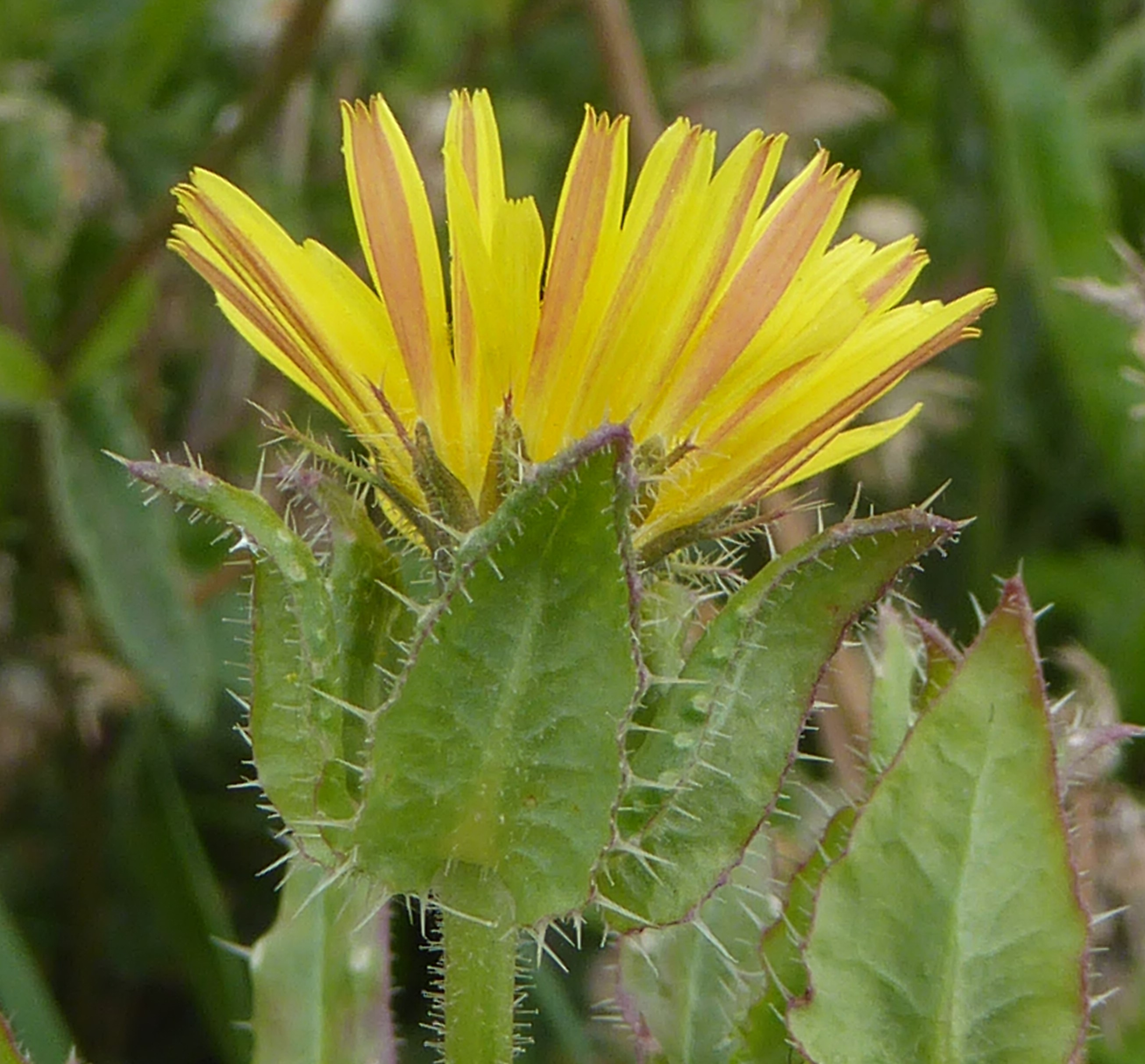
Outer rays of bristly oxtongue are sometimes red striped.

Helminthotheca echioides is thought to be native to North Africa and the Mediterranean Basin, where it grows in semi-arid conditions that are reproduced in the ruderal habitats associated with agriculture and the disturbed soils created by human activity throughout the world. As a result, it has spread as a weed to all the continents (except mainland Antarctica), and it is often abundant in farmland and towns.

The IUCN has not yet assessed the global status of bristly oxtongue, but where it has been assessed within its native range, it is generally assigned to the category LC (least concern).

In Great Britain it is common in the south and east and more patchily distributed to the north and west, whereas it is rare in Ireland. It is considered to be an archaeophyte (ancient introduction) throughout the British Isles, and it is thought to be increasing in many areas.

It has been introduced to North America, where it can now be found from Nova Scotia to British Columbia and California, and it is classified as an invasive weed.

It was first noticed in Australia in 1871 and has since spread to most parts of the country.

== Ecology ==
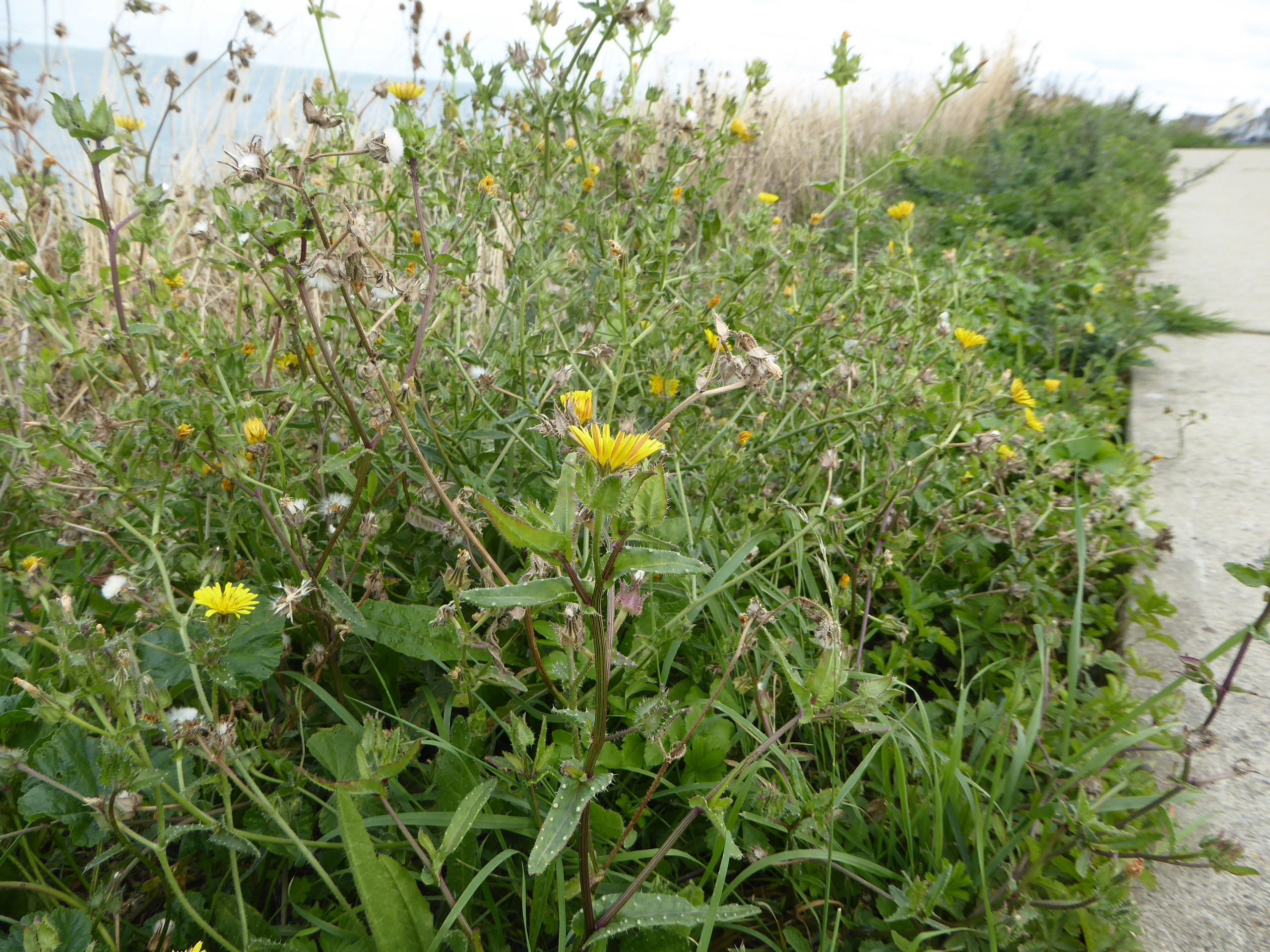
Typical habitat for bristly oxtongue, along a verge

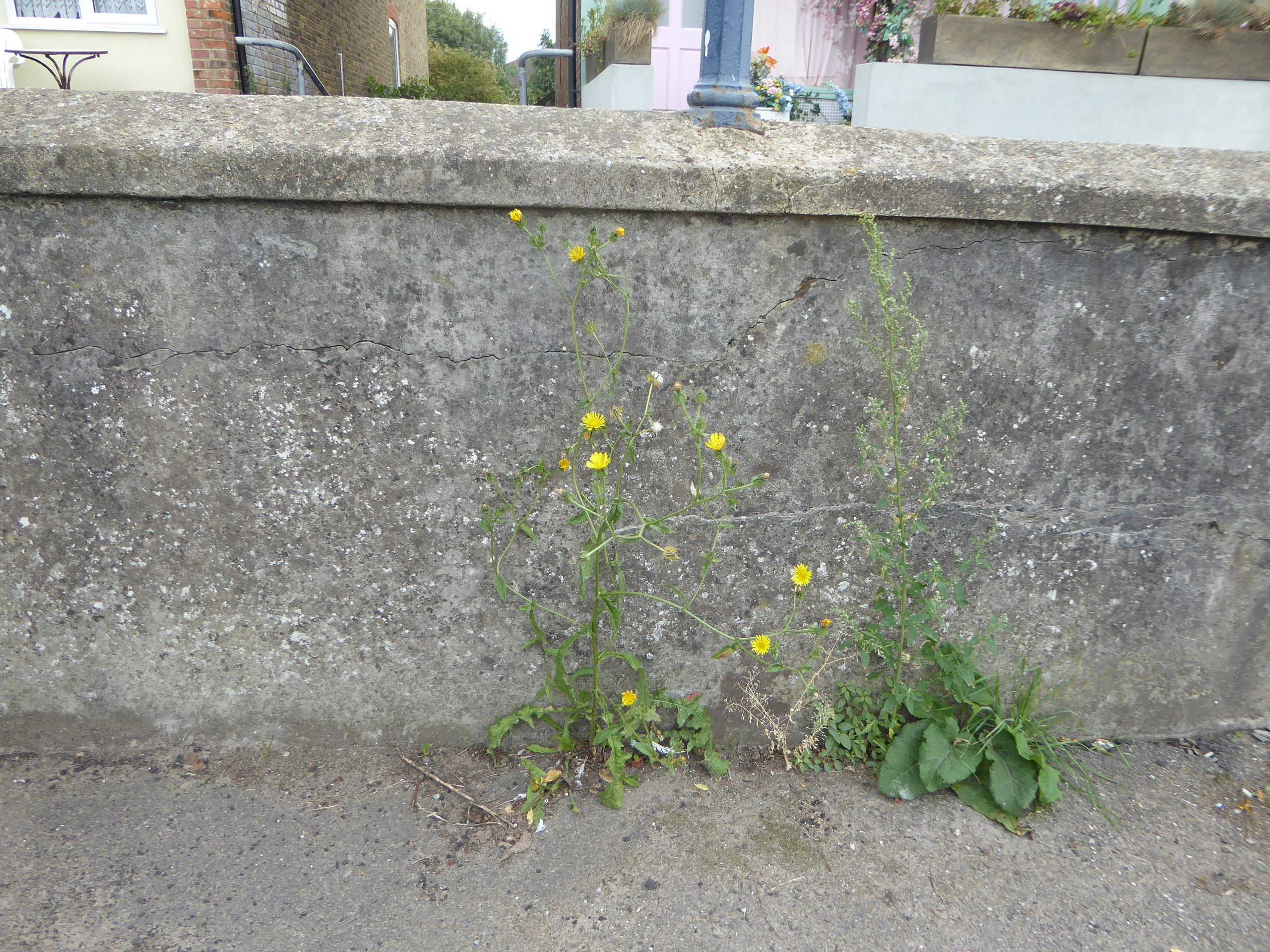
Bristly oxtongue growing as a pavement weed

Bristly oxtongue is an opportunist species which will colonise disturbed ground very quickly. It is considered to act as a therophyte, which completes its life cycle quickly, or a hemicryptophyte, which has a basal rosette to survive unfavourable conditions such as winter or drought. The feathery pappus allows seeds to be widely dispersed by the wind, but it has no capacity for vegetative spread (for example, by stolons or bulbs). Typical habitats for it include waste ground, field margins, sea walls, road verges and banks on clay soils or chalk. One reason for its success is that it is particularly resistant to drought, being able to sprout from basal shoots after dry periods.

It generally grows in places where there is full sunlight, whilst also tolerating partial shade, for example, by hedgerows; it requires moderately damp soils with a slightly alkaline reaction; and it prefers moderately fertile conditions. The Ellenberg values in Britain are L = 7, F = 5, R = 7, N = 6, and S = 0.

It is a lowland plant in the British Isles, recorded only up to 370 m (in south Wales).

The UK Database of Insects and their Food Plants lists four species that make use of bristly oxtongue. The larvae of the fly Tephritis separata, which is widespread throughout Europe and Asia, live on the flowers. The wasp Phanacis caulicola (Hedicke, 1939) has larvae that tunnel chambers inside the stem, leaving no visible sign of their presence until they emerge. Two moths also live on this species: Neocochylis hybridella caterpillars feed within the seedheads, and the tortrix moth Aethes tesserana larvae feed within the roots. Both these species are also widespread in Europe and western Asia.

== Uses ==
The leaves were formerly used as a pot herb, and were "esteemed good to relax the bowels". There are also various reports of it being used as an antihelminthic treatment, although this may be due to confusion about the meaning of its name. The English herbalist Nicholas Culpeper considered "lang de boeuf" to be a good cure for melancholy (when steeped in wine), and a general alexipharmic (antidote to unspecified toxins).

Although it is not a popular culinary herb, some foragers like to use the flowers to flavour vinegar.

Some pet owners feed bristly oxtongue to their tortoises, but they do not like it.
