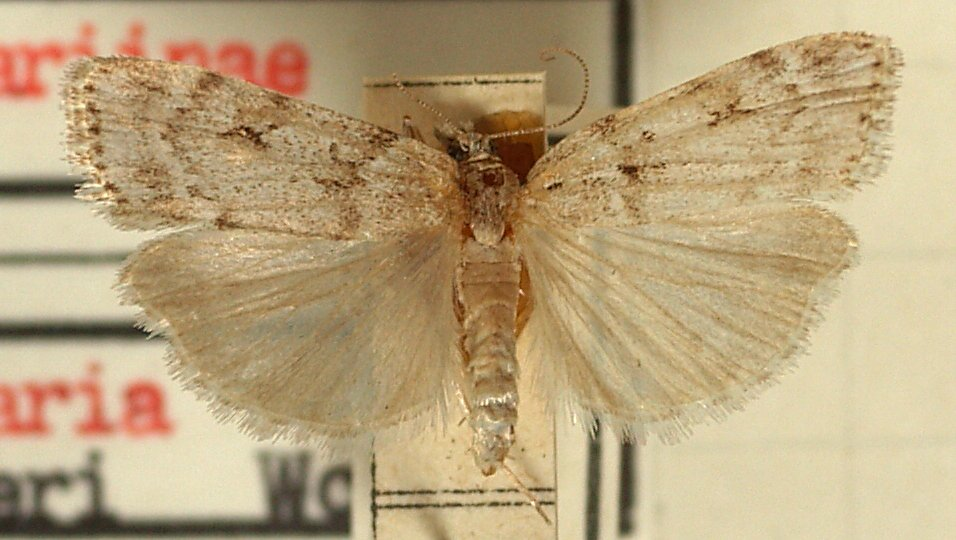
- Subspecies S. subfusca zelleri

Scientific classification
- Kingdom: Animalia
- Phylum: Arthropoda
- Clade: Pancrustacea
- Class: Insecta
- Order: Lepidoptera
- Family: Crambidae
- Genus: Scoparia
- Species: S. subfusca

Binomial name
- Scoparia subfusca Haworth, 1811

Synonyms
- Scoparia subfusca anatolica Caradja, 1916; Scoparia subfusca bicornutella Amsel, 1954; Scoparia cembrae Haworth, 1811; Eudorea zelleri Wocke, 1855; Scoparia subfusca zelleri f. brigittae Leraut, 1984; Scoparia cembrae f. ind. dardennei Marion, 1959; Scoparia cembrae pfeifferi Marion, 1960; Scoparia graecella Stainton, 1849; Scoparia scotica White, 1872

= Scoparia subfusca =

Species of moth

Scoparia subfusca is a species of moth of the family Crambidae. It is found in Europe.

The wingspan is 20–27 mm. The forewings are brown-grey, mixed or suffused with whitish, sometimes with a few black scales; a short black dash from base of costa; lines whitish, dark-edged internally, first curved, second angularly bent above middle; orbicular indistinctly outlined with blackish, touching first line; claviform indistinct, blackish, touching first line; a blackish X-shaped discal mark, upper half filled with brownish: subterminal line very cloudy, whitish. Hindwings are whitish-grey. The larva is whitish; dorsal line blackish; spots large, ochreous-tinged; head brown; plate of 2 pale brownish.

The moth flies from May to September depending on the location.

The larvae feed on Picris hieracioides and Tussilago.
