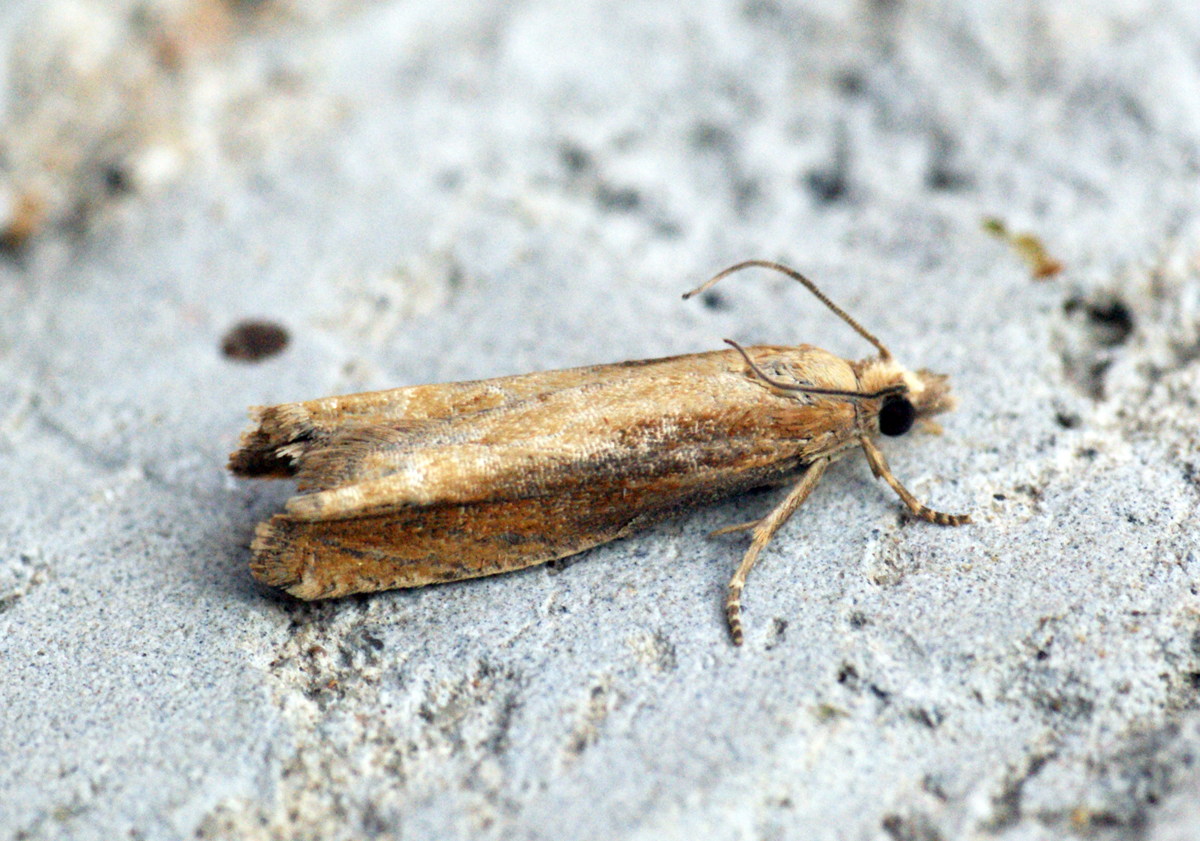

Scientific classification
- Kingdom: Animalia
- Phylum: Arthropoda
- Clade: Pancrustacea
- Class: Insecta
- Order: Lepidoptera
- Family: Tortricidae
- Genus: Eucosma
- Species: E. obumbratana

Binomial name
- Eucosma obumbratana (Lienig & Zeller, 1846)

Synonyms
- Grapholitha obumbratana Lienig & Zeller, 1846; Tortrix (Semasia) ibiceana Herrich-Schaffer, 1951; Semasia laharpana Laharpe, 1858; Peronea rufana Stephens, 1834; Grapholitha westwoodiana Doubleday, 1850

= Eucosma obumbratana =

Species of moth

Eucosma obumbratana is a moth of the family Tortricidae. It is found in Europe, China (Jilin), Russia and Kazakhstan.

The wingspan is 14–20 mm. The forewings are yellow-brown, usually lighter in the posterior part. At the outer edge there are a couple of short black longitudinal lines and at the tip a small, triangular white spot. The hindwings are grey-brown. Adults are on wing from July to August. There is one generation per year.

The larvae feed on the seedheads of Sonchus arvensis, Picris hieracioides and Centaurea jacea.
