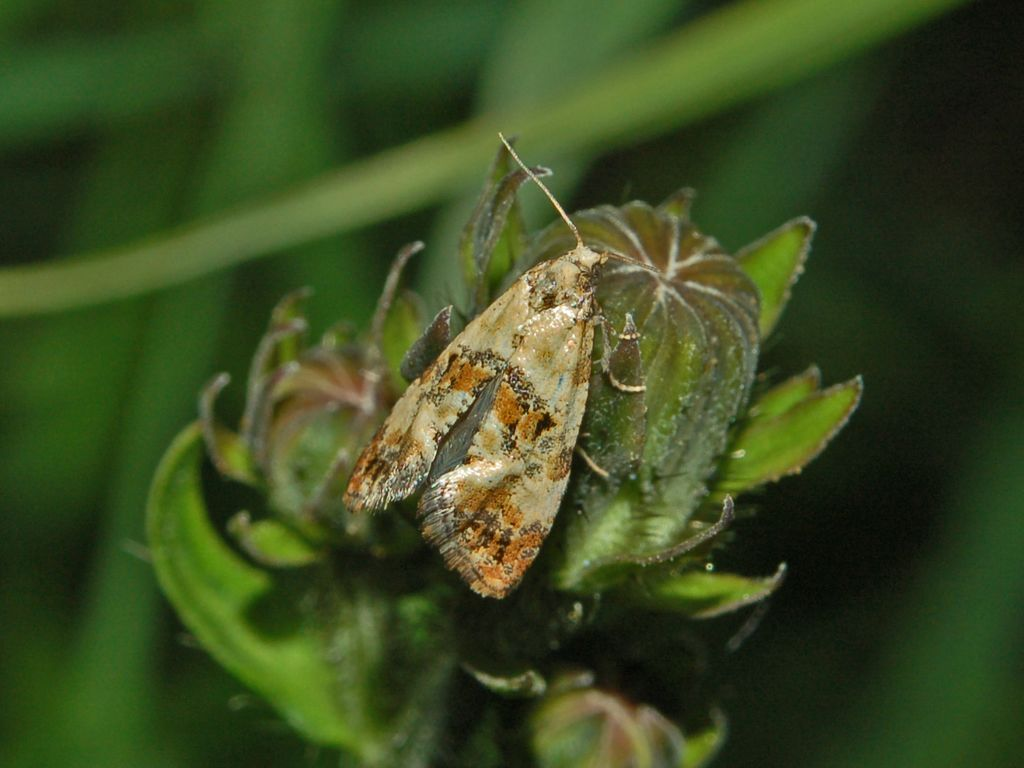

Scientific classification
- Kingdom: Animalia
- Phylum: Arthropoda
- Clade: Pancrustacea
- Class: Insecta
- Order: Lepidoptera
- Family: Tortricidae
- Genus: Cochylis
- Species: C. hybridella

Binomial name
- Cochylis hybridella (Hübner, 1810-1813)

Synonyms
- Tinea hybridella Hübner, 1813; Cochylis dissolutana Herrich-Schäffer, 1847; Cochylis carduana Zeller, 1847; Conchylis dubitana var. clarana Caradja, 1916; Grapholitha carduana var. subvittana Staudinger, 1892

= Cochylis hybridella =

Species of moth

Cochylis hybridella is a moth species of the family Tortricidae. It is found in most of Europe, the Near East, China (Gansu, Guizhou, Heilongjiang, Inner Mongolia, Jilin, Liaoning, Ningxia, Shaanxi, Shanxi, Xinjiang), Japan, Korea and Russia.

The wingspan is about 15 mm. The head is ochreous- white. The thorax is ochreous- white, somewhat fuscous marked. The costa of the forewings is hardly arched. The ground colour is ochreous-white, sometimes faintly rosy-tinged. The costa and dorsum are strigulated with blackish and there is a fuscous stria at 1/4, forming a small costal spot. It has a very irregular median fascia, narrow on the costa and widely interrupted beneath it, and an irregular terminal fascia mixed with ferruginous, dark fuscous, and black. The hindwings in male whitish-grey, in female grey. The larva is pale pink; head light brown; plate of 2 yellowish, with four black dots : Julius von Kennel provides a full description.

The adult moths fly in June, July and August.

The larvae feed on Picris hieracioides, Picris echioides and Crepis species.
