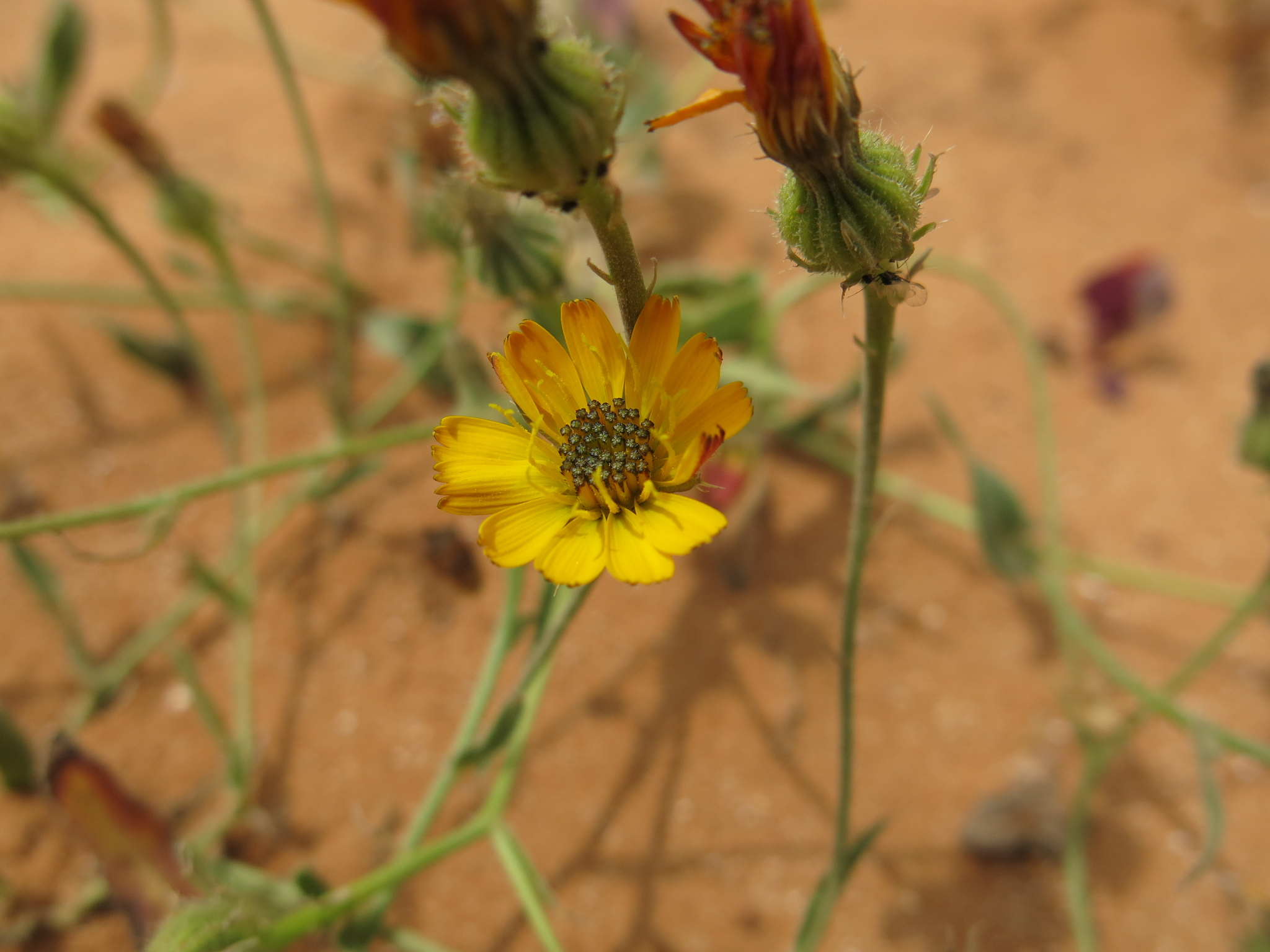

Scientific classification
- Kingdom: Plantae
- Clade: Tracheophytes
- Clade: Angiosperms
- Clade: Eudicots
- Clade: Asterids
- Order: Asterales
- Family: Asteraceae
- Genus: Picris
- Species: P. amalecitana

Binomial name
- Picris amalecitana (Boiss.) Eig

Synonyms
- Hagioseris amalecitana Boiss.; Hagioseris galilaea var. diffusa Boiss.; Picris intermedia Eig

= Picris amalecitana =

Species of flowering plant

Picris amalecitana, the Amalek ox-tongue, is a species of flowering plant in the family Asteraceae. It is found across Egypt, Turkey and the Middle East.

== Taxonomy ==
=== Etymology ===
Picris amalecitana is named after the Amalek, a tribe dwelling south of Judah, in Biblical times.
