= Picris squarrosa =

Scientific classification
- Kingdom: Plantae
- Clade: Tracheophytes
- Clade: Angiosperms
- Clade: Eudicots
- Clade: Asterids
- Order: Asterales
- Family: Asteraceae
- Genus: Picris
- Species: P. squarrosa

Binomial name
- Picris squarrosa Steetz

Species of plant

Picris squarrosa is a species of plant native to Australia.
