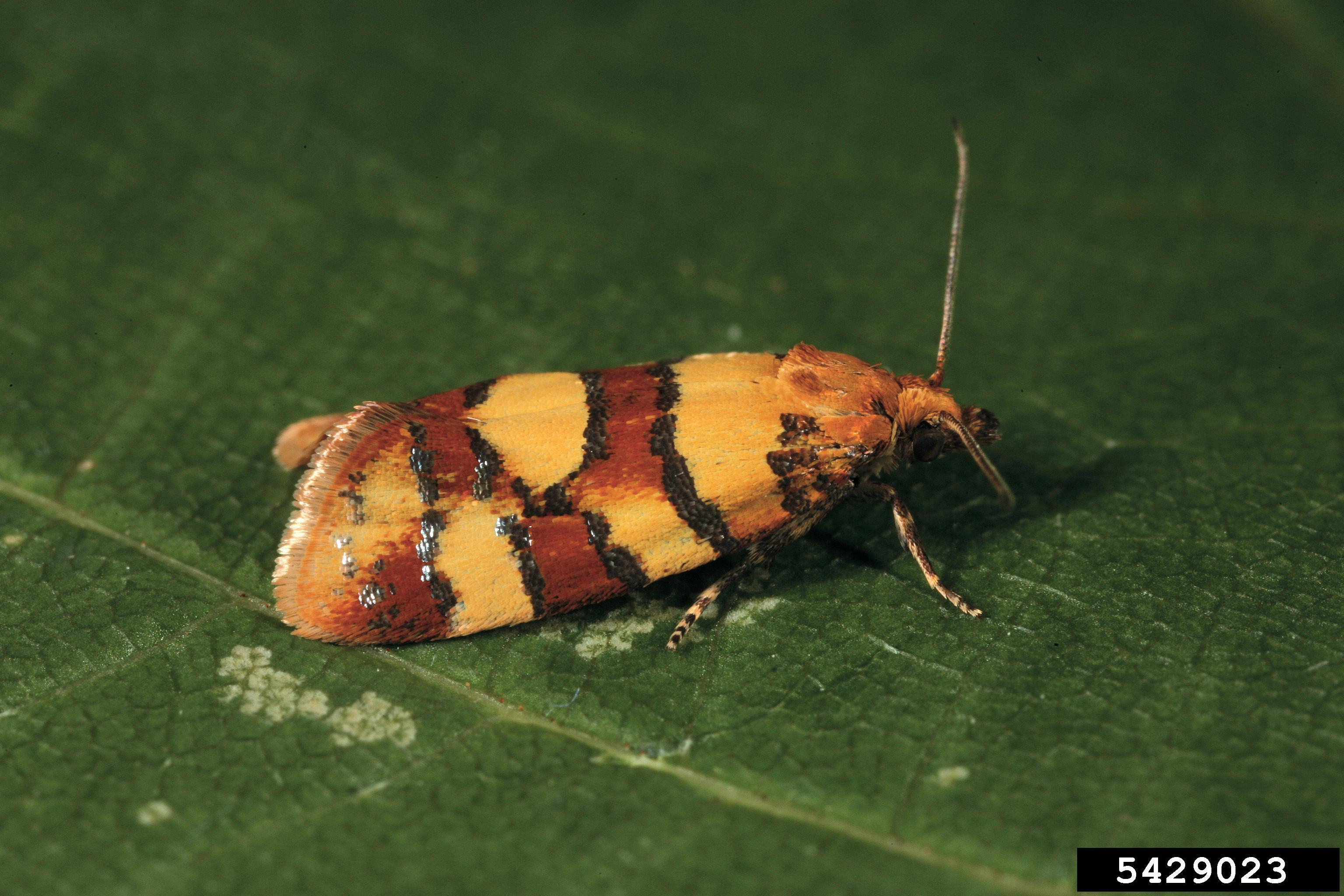

Scientific classification
- Domain: Eukaryota
- Kingdom: Animalia
- Phylum: Arthropoda
- Class: Insecta
- Order: Lepidoptera
- Family: Tortricidae
- Genus: Aethes
- Species: A. tesserana

Binomial name
- Aethes tesserana ([Denis & Schiffermuller], 1775)

Synonyms
- Tortrix tesserana [Denis & Schiffermuller], 1775; Tinea alcella Fabricius, 1781; Phalaena aleella Schulze, 1776; Conchylis aleella ab. bicolorana Reutti, 1898; Tortrix groendaliana Thunberg & Becklin, 1791; Pyralis heiseana Fabricius, 1787; Pharmacis magister Walsingham, 1900; Tortrix tesselana Hubner, [1796-1799]; Phalaena tusserana Fabricius, 1787

= Aethes tesserana =

Species of moth

Aethes tesserana is a moth of the family Tortricidae. It is found in most of Europe, the Near East and northern Iran.

The wingspan is 12–18 millimetres (0.47–0.71 in). Adults are on wing from May to August.

The larvae feed on the roots of Picris and Hieracium species.

== Subspecies ==
- Aethes tesserana tesserana
- Aethes tesserana magister (Walsingham, 1900) (Asia Minor)
