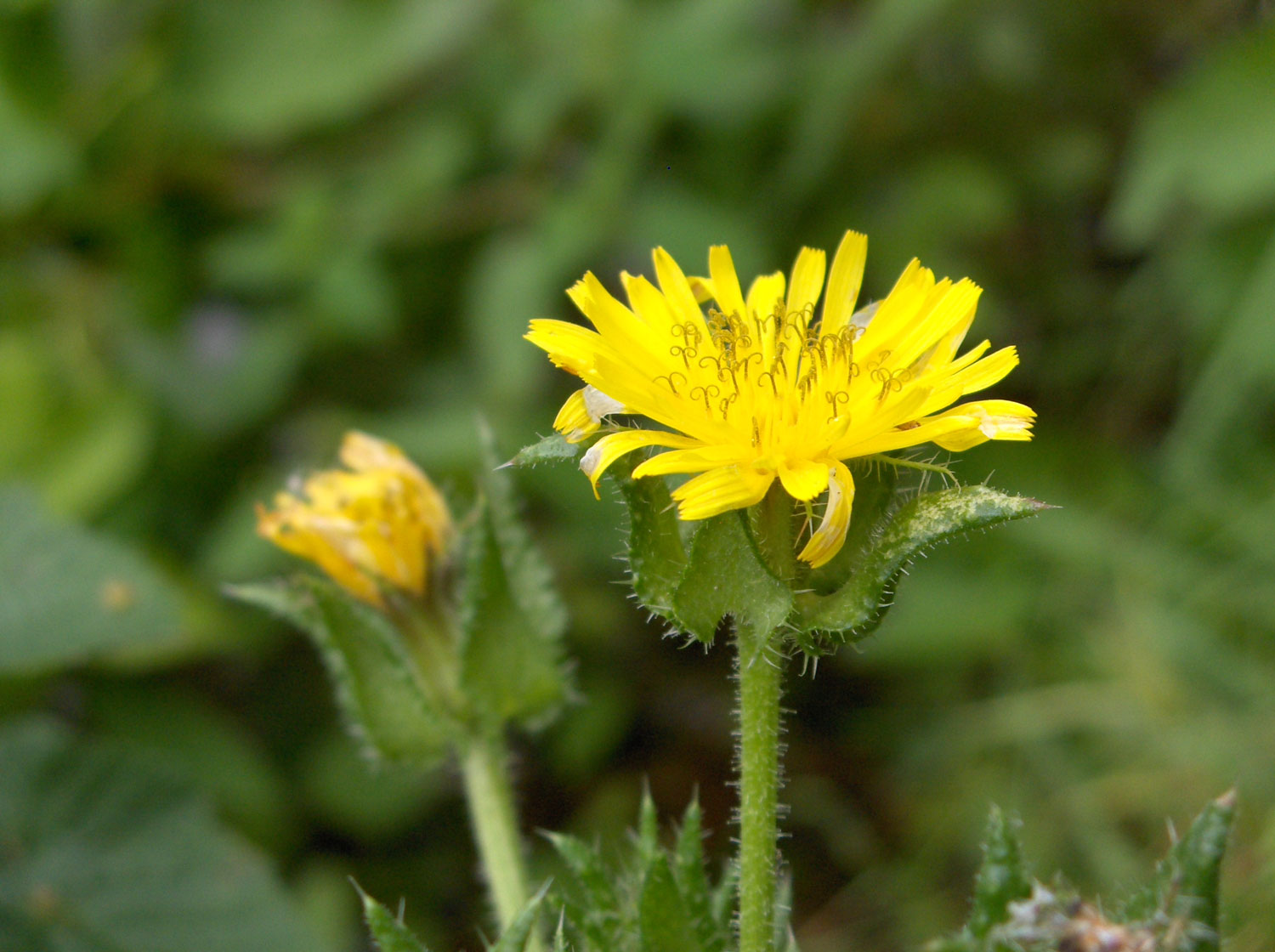
- Helminthotheca echioides

Scientific classification
- Kingdom: Plantae
- Clade: Tracheophytes
- Clade: Angiosperms
- Clade: Eudicots
- Clade: Asterids
- Order: Asterales
- Family: Asteraceae
- Subfamily: Cichorioideae
- Tribe: Cichorieae
- Subtribe: Hypochaeridinae
- Genus: Helminthotheca; Vaill. ex Zinn

Synonyms
- Helminthia Juss.; Vigineixia Pomel

= Helminthotheca =

Genus of flowering plants

Helminthotheca (commonly called ox-tongue) is a genus in the tribe Cichorieae of the family Asteraceae. Helminthotheca is closely related to the genus Picris, both within the Hypochaeridinae subtribe.

Species

- Helminthotheca aculeata - Italy, Algeria, Morocco, Tunisia
- Helminthotheca balansae - Algeria, Morocco
- Helminthotheca comosa - Algeria, Morocco, southern Spain, Gibraltar
- Helminthotheca echioides (syn. Picris echioides) - widespread across much of Europe and the Mediterranean from Ireland + Canary Islands to Poland + Iran; naturalized in Australia, North and South America
- Helminthotheca glomerata - Algeria, Tunisia, Morocco
- Helminthotheca spinosa - central and southern Portugal, southwestern Spain
