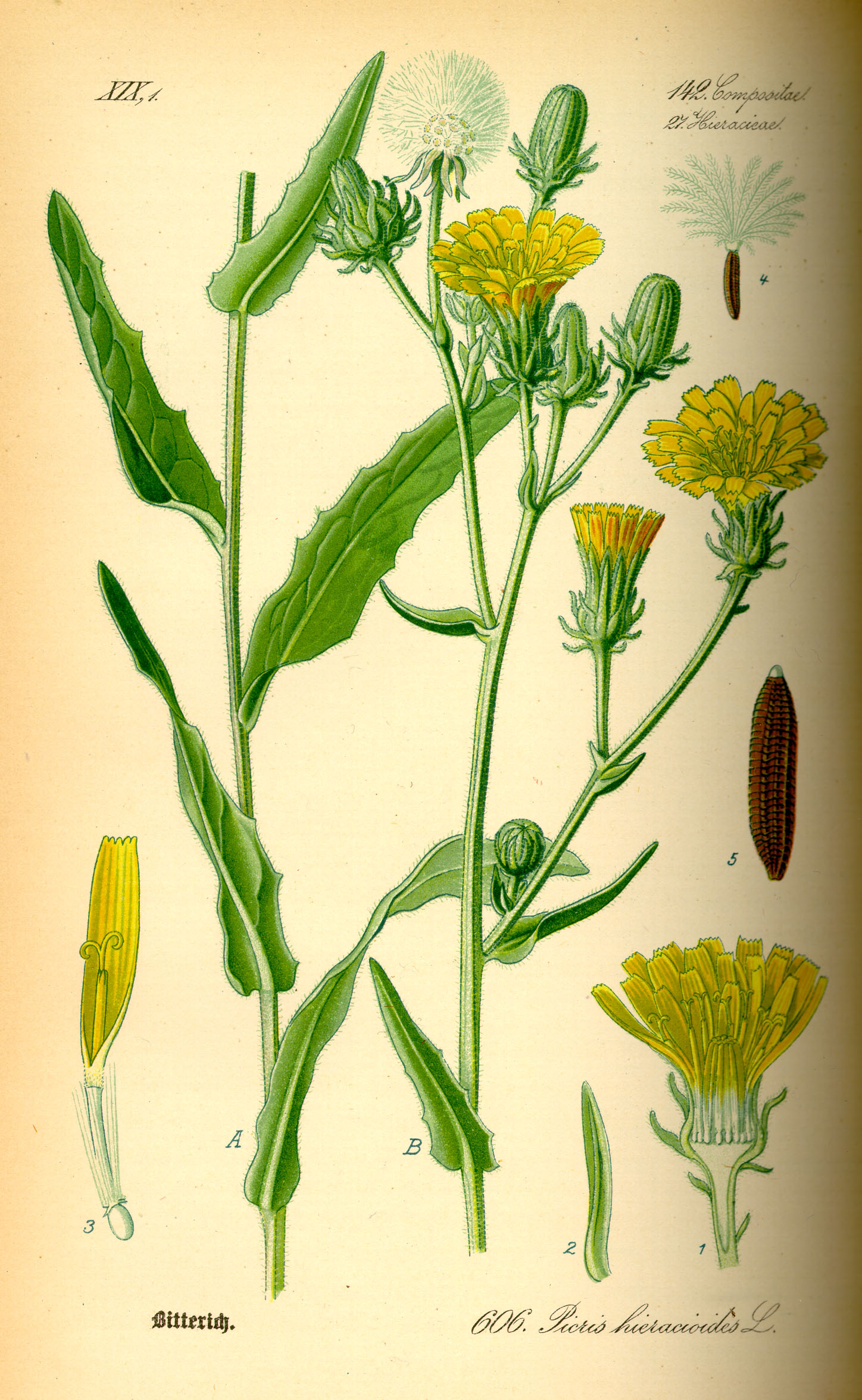
- Picris hieracioides

Scientific classification
- Kingdom: Plantae
- Clade: Tracheophytes
- Clade: Angiosperms
- Clade: Eudicots
- Clade: Asterids
- Order: Asterales
- Family: Asteraceae
- Subfamily: Cichorioideae
- Tribe: Cichorieae
- Subtribe: Hypochaeridinae
- Genus: Picris; L.

Type species
- Picris hieracioides L.

Synonyms
- Spitzelia Sch.Bip.; Medicusia Moench; Hagioseris Boiss.; Deckera Sch.Bip.

= Picris =

Genus of flowering plants

Picris (oxtongues) is a genus of flowering plants in the family Asteraceae described as a genus by Linnaeus in 1753.

Picris species are used as food plants by the larvae of some Lepidoptera species, such as the grass moth Diasemia reticularis. Schinia cardui feeds exclusively on P. hieracioides.

The genus is widespread across Europe, Asia, Africa, and Australia.

== Etymology ==
Picris is from the Greek picros meaning 'bitter', in reference to the bitter taste of some species in the genus.

== Description ==
Erect annual to perennial taprooted herbs, mostly branching, stem and leaves bearing stiff bristly hairs, with rather large, usually corymbose or paniculate heads of yellow flowers.

== Taxonomy ==
=== Taxonomic history ===
The genus Picris was first validly described by Linnaeus in 1753 with the genus being accepted by a number of secondary sources including Plants of the World Online. Linnaeus initially described four species with P. hieracioides, P. echioides, P. pyrenaica and P. asplenioides. In 1913, Britton and Brown proposed P. asplenioides as the type species for the genus. Subsequently, in 1930, Hitchcock and Green alternatively proposed P. hieracioides as the type species. The Hitchcock and Green proposal was adopted by Lack in 1975 and accepted by Jarvis in 1992. Lack argued that Linnaeus never saw P. asplenioides which Linnaeus regarded as an obscure species and no specimen could be found in the Linnean Herbarium. For this reason Lack concluded that P. hieracioides should be designated as the type species.

In 1794, the German botanist Conrad Moench described the genus Medicusia and the species M. aspera. This genus has not been accepted and is considered a synonym of Picris. M. aspera has also been determined to be a synonym of P. rhagadioloides.

=== Species ===
'Source

- Picris albida
- Picris altissima
- Picris amalecitana
- Picris angustifolia
- Picris aspera
- Picris asplenioides
- Picris atlantica
- Picris babylonica
- Picris barbarorum
- Picris bracteatus
- Picris burbidgeae
- Picris campylocarpa
- Picris comosa
- Picris compacta
- Picris conyzoides
- Picris cupuligera
- Picris cyanocarpa
- Picris cyprica
- Picris cyrenaica
- Picris davurica
- Picris divaricata
- Picris drummondii
- Picris eichleri
- Picris evae
- Picris flexuosa
- Picris galilaea
- Picris helminthioides
- Picris hieracioides
- Picris hispanica
- Picris hispidissima
- Picris humilis
- Picris japonica
- Picris junnanensis
- Picris kotschyi
- Picris littoralis
- Picris longifolia
- Picris longirostris
- Picris macloviana
- Picris macrantha
- Picris macrorhiza
- Picris manginiana
- Picris morrisonensis
- Picris nigricans
- Picris nuristanica
- Picris ohwiana
- Picris olympica
- Picris pauciflora
- Picris pygmaea
- Picris racemosa
- Picris rhagadioloides
- Picris rivularis
- Picris sancta
- Picris scaberrima
- Picris scabra
- Picris senecioides
- Picris sinuata
- Picris spinosissima
- Picris squarrosa
- Picris strigosa
- Picris sulphurea
- Picris wagenitzii
- Picris willkommii
- Picris xylopoda

== Sources ==
- Boissier, Edmond (1849). Diagnoses plantarum Orientalium novarum. 1. Vol. 11.
- Britton, Nathaniel Lord; Brown, Addison (1913). An illustrated flora of the northern United States, Canada and the British possessions, from Newfoundland to the parallel of the southern boundary of Virginia, and from the Atlantic Ocean westward to the 102d meridian. Vol. 3 (2 ed.). New York: Scribner.
- Compositae Working Group (CWG) (2020). "Compositae Database". Compositae Working Group (CWG). doi:10.14284/411.
- Hitchcock, A. S.; Green, M. L. (1929). "IV.-Proposal by A.S. Hitchcock (Washington) and M.L. Green (Kew).". International Botanical Congress, Cambridge (England) 1930. London: Printed under the authority of His Majesty's Stationery Office, by Wyman & sons, Ltd., Fetter Lane, London. pp. 111–199.
- Jarvis, C.E. (August 1992). Nicolson, Dan H. (ed.). "Seventy-Two Proposals for the Conservation of Types of Selected Linnaean Generic Names, the Report of Subcommittee 3C on the Lectotypification of Linnaean Generic Names". Taxon. 41 (3): 552–583. Bibcode:1992Taxon..41..552J. doi:10.2307/1222833. JSTOR 1222833.
- Lack, H. Walter (February 1975). "Type Specimens of the Linnaean Species of Picris L. (Compositae)". Taxon. 24 (1): 113–116. Bibcode:1975Taxon..24..113L. doi:10.2307/1219007. JSTOR 1219007.
- Linnaeus, Carl (1753). Species plantarum : exhibentes plantas rite cognitas ad genera relatas, cum differentiis specificis, nominibus trivialibus, synonymis selectis, locis natalibus, secundum systema sexuale digestas (in Latin). Vol. 2. Berlin: Junk.
- Moench, Conrad (1794). Methodus plantas horti botanici et agri Marburgensis :a staminum situ describendi (in Latin). Vol. 2. Marburgi Cattorum: in officina nova libraria academiae.
- Holzapfel, S. (2015). Flora of Australia (PDF). Mantisalca. Vol. 37. Melbourne: ABRS/CSIRO.
- Schultz, Carl Heinrich `Bipontinus' (1833). Flora oder Botanische Zeitung :welche Recensionen, Abhandlungen, Aufsätze, Neuigkeiten und Nachrichten, die Botanik betreffend, enthält (in Latin and German). Vol. 16. Regensburg: Die Gesellschaft.
- Schultz, Carl Heinrich `Bipontinus' (1834). Flora oder Botanische Zeitung :welche Recensionen, Abhandlungen, Aufsätze, Neuigkeiten und Nachrichten, die Botanik betreffend, enthält (in Latin and German). Vol. 17. Regensburg: Die Gesellschaft.
