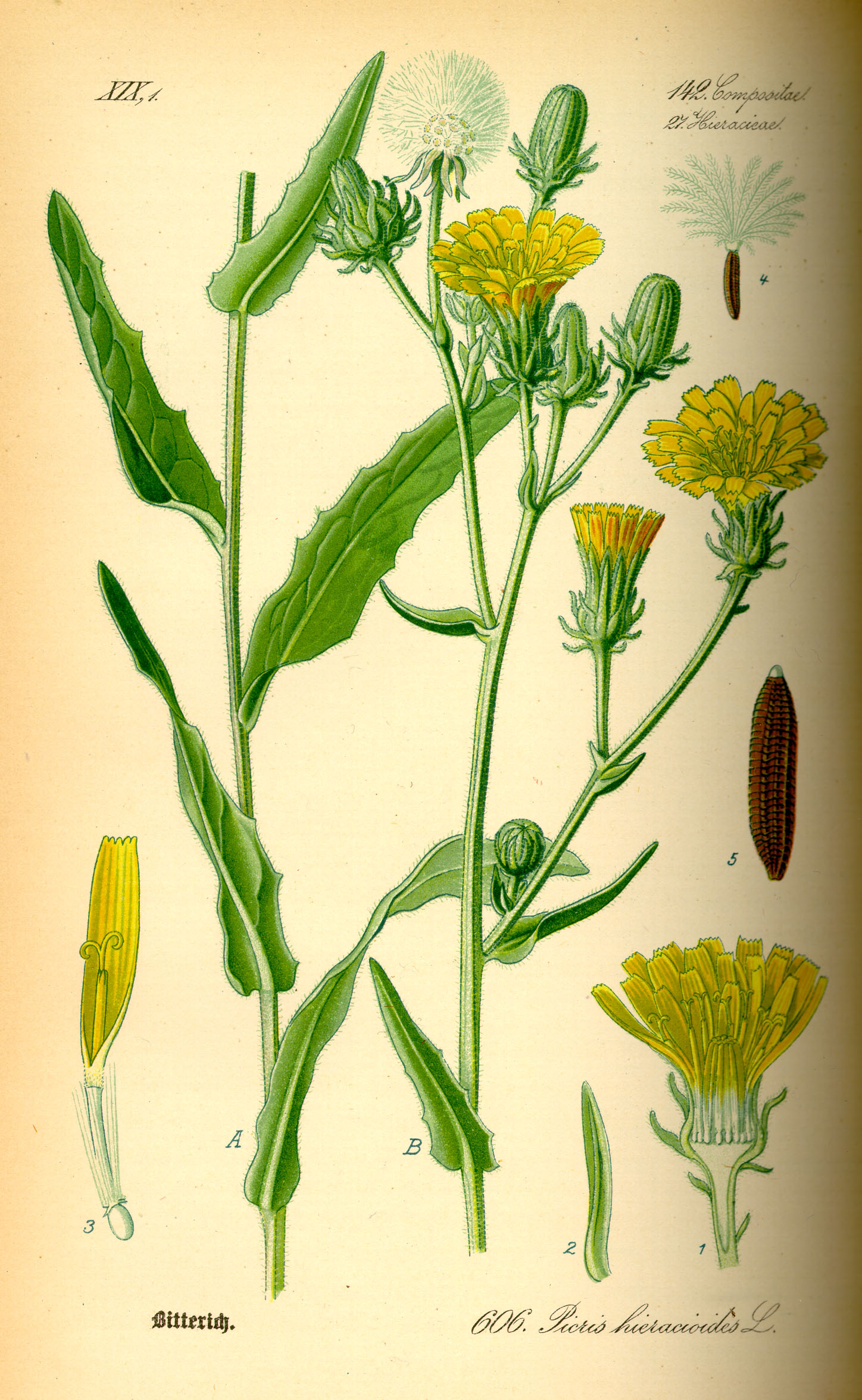
- Picris hieracioides

Scientific classification
- Kingdom: Plantae
- Clade: Tracheophytes
- Clade: Angiosperms
- Clade: Eudicots
- Clade: Asterids
- Order: Asterales
- Family: Asteraceae
- Genus: Picris
- Species: P. hieracioides

Binomial name
- Picris hieracioides L.

= Picris hieracioides =

Species of flowering plant

Picris hieracioides, or hawkweed oxtongue, is a species of flowering plant in the family Asteraceae.

== Description ==
Hawkweed oxtongue is described as having long and narrow simple leaves, with or without teeth, resembling an ox's tongue. The leaves at the base form a rosette, while the stems can grow up to 1 metre (3.2 feet) in height. The plant blooms in summer, producing small, yellow flower with many petals, somewhat resembling a dandelion.

== Ecology ==
Hawkweed oxtongue is native to Europe and Asia, but is an invasive species in Africa, Australia, and North America. The plant can spread seeds rapidly, outcompeting native species, while also emitting a chemical inhibiting nearby plants' growth.

== Bibliography ==
- Linnaeus, Carl (1753). Species plantarum : exhibentes plantas rite cognitas ad genera relatas, cum differentiis specificis, nominibus trivialibus, synonymis selectis, locis natalibus, secundum systema sexuale digestas (in Latin). Vol. 2. Berlin: Junk.
